= Bibliography of the Chinese language and writing system =

The Chinese language has an attested history spanning more than three millennia, and linguists have reconstructed forms spoken millennia prior to the earliest known examples of written Chinese c. 1200 BC. Chinese may be viewed either as a holistic unit with great internal topological variation, or as an entire language family comprising many groupings of varieties. Written Chinese makes use of Chinese characters, one of the four independent inventions of writing agreed by scholars, and the only one of these remaining in use. Speakers and readers exhibit a high degree of diglossia between both local varieties and Standard Chinese, and between written and spoken language. The historically predominant written form of the language is known as Literary Chinese.

== Overviews ==
- Chan, Sin-Wai, ed. (2016). The Routledge Encyclopedia of the Chinese Language. Routledge. ISBN 978-1-317-38249-2.
- DeFrancis, John (1984). The Chinese Language: Fact and Fantasy. Honolulu: University of Hawaiʻi Press. ISBN 978-0-8248-1068-9.
- Harbsmeier, Christoph; Needham, Joseph, eds. (2006) [1998]. Science and Chinese Society: Language and Logic. Science and civilisation in China. Vol. VII:1 (Reprint ed.). Cambridge University Press. ISBN 978-0-521-57143-2.
- Kane, Daniel A. (2006). Chinese Language: A Survey of Its History and Current Usage. North Clarendon, VT: Tuttle. ISBN 978-0-8048-3853-5.
- Kornicki, Peter (2018). Languages, Scripts, and Chinese Texts in East Asia. Oxford University Press. ISBN 978-0-192-51869-9.
- Norman, Jerry (1988). Chinese. Cambridge University Press. ISBN 978-0-521-29653-3.
- Sybesma, Rint, ed. (2015). Encyclopedia of Chinese Language and Linguistics Online. Brill. doi:10.1163/2210-7363-ecll-all. ISSN 2210-7363.

== Phonology ==
- Yuen Ren Chao (趙元任) (1948). Mandarin Primer: an Intensive Course in Spoken Chinese. Harvard University Press. ISBN 978-0-674-73288-9.
- ——— (1968). A Grammar of Spoken Chinese (2nd ed.). University of California Press. ISBN 978-0-520-00219-7.
- Duanmu San (端木三) (2007) [2000]. The Phonology of Standard Chinese (2nd ed.). Oxford University Press. ISBN 978-0-19-921579-9.

== Grammar ==
- Chappell, Hilary, ed. (2001). Sinitic Grammar: Synchronic and Diachronic Perspectives. Oxford University Press. ISBN 978-0-19-829977-6.
- Geaney, Jane (2022). The Emergence of Word-meaning in Early China: A Grammatology. Albany: State University of New York Press. ISBN 978-1-4384-8895-0.
- Pulleyblank, Edwin G. (1995). Outline of Classical Chinese Grammar. Vancouver: University of British Columbia Press. ISBN 978-0-7748-0541-4.
- Vogelsang, Kai (2021). Introduction to Classical Chinese. Oxford University Press. ISBN 978-0-198-83497-7.

=== Morphosyntax ===
- Packard, Jerome L. (2000). The Morphology of Chinese. Cambridge University Press. ISBN 978-0-521-77112-2.
- Li, Charles N.; Thompson, Sandra A. (1981). Mandarin Chinese: A Functional Reference Grammar. Berkeley: University of California Press. ISBN 978-0-520-06610-6.

== Historical linguistics ==
=== Old Chinese ===
- Baxter, William H. (1992). A Handbook of Old Chinese Phonology. Berlin: Mouton de Gruyter. ISBN 978-3-11-012324-1.
- ———; Sagart, Laurent (2014). Old Chinese: A New Reconstruction. Oxford University Press. ISBN 978-0-19-994537-5.

=== Middle Chinese ===
- Branner, David Prager, ed. (2006). The Chinese Rime Tables: Linguistic Philosophy and Historical-Comparative Phonology. Studies in the Theory and History of Linguistic Science, Series IV: Current Issues in Linguistic Theory. Vol. 271. Amsterdam: John Benjamins. ISBN 978-90-272-4785-8.
- Pulleyblank, Edwin G. (1984). Middle Chinese: A Study in Historical Phonology. Vancouver: University of British Columbia Press. ISBN 978-0-7748-0192-8.

== Sociolinguistics ==
- Yuen Ren Chao (1976). Aspects of Chinese Sociolinguistics: Essays. Language science and national development. Stanford University Press. ISBN 978-0-8047-0909-5.
- Chen Ping (陳平) (1999). Modern Chinese: History and Sociolinguistics (4th ed.). Cambridge University Press. ISBN 978-0-521-64572-0.
- DeFrancis, John (1972) [1950]. Nationalism and language reform in China. New York: Octagon. ISBN 978-0-374-92095-1.
- Kaske, Elisabeth, ed. (2008). The Politics of Language in Chinese Education, 1895–1919. Sinica Leidensia. Leiden: Brill. ISBN 978-90-474-2333-1.
- Li, Yuming (2015). Language Planning in China. Language Policies and Practices in China. Berlin: Mouton de Gruyter. ISBN 978-1-61451-558-6.
- Zhong, Yurou (2019). Chinese Grammatology: Script Revolution and Literary Modernity, 1916–1958. Columbia University Press. doi:10.7312/zhon19262. ISBN 978-0-231-54989-9.

=== Varieties and dialectology ===
- Ramsey, S. Robert (1989) [1987]. The Languages of China (2nd ed.). Princeton University Press. ISBN 978-0-691-01468-5.
- Tam, Gina Anne (2020). Dialect and Nationalism in China, 1860–1960. Cambridge University Press. ISBN 978-1-108-77640-0.

== Grammatology ==
- Li, Yu (2020). The Chinese Writing System in Asia: An Interdisciplinary Perspective. Routledge. ISBN 978-1-138-90731-7.
- Chen, Jack W.; Detwyler, Anatoly; Liu, Xiao; Nugent, Christopher M. B. & Rusk, Bruce, eds. (2021). Literary Information in China. New York: Columbia University Press. ISBN 978-0-231-19552-2.

=== Palaeography ===
- Boltz, William G. (1986). "Early Chinese writing". World Archaeology. 17 (3). Taylor & Francis: 420–436. doi:10.1080/00438243.1986.9979980.
- ——— (1994). The Origin and Early Development of the Chinese Writing System. New Haven: American Oriental Society. ISBN 978-0-940490-78-9.
- ——— (1999). "Language and Writing". In Loewe, Michael; Shaughnessy, Edward L. (eds.). The Cambridge History of Ancient China: From the Origins of Civilization to 221 BC. Cambridge University Press. pp. 74–123. ISBN 978-1-139-05370-9.
- Demattè, Paola (2022). The Origins of Chinese Writing. Oxford University Press. ISBN 978-0-197-63576-6.
- Keightley, David N. (1985) [1978]. Sources of Shang History: The Oracle-Bone Inscriptions of Bronze Age China. Berkeley: University of California Press. ISBN 978-0-520-02969-9.
- ——— (2000). The Ancestral Landscape: Time, Space, and Community in Late Shang China (ca. 1200–1045 B.C.). Berkeley: University of California Press. ISBN 978-1-55729-070-0.
- Li, Feng; Branner, David Prager, eds. (2011). Writing and Literacy in Early China: Studies from the Columbia Early China Seminar. Seattle: University of Washington Press. ISBN 978-0-295-99152-8.
- Qiu Xigui (2000) [1988]. Chinese Writing. Translated by Mattos, Gilbert L.; Norman, Jerry. Berkeley: Society for the Study of Early China and The Institute of East Asian Studies, University of California. ISBN 978-1-55729-071-7.
- Zhou Youguang (2003). The Historical Evolution of Chinese Languages and Scripts 中国语文的时代演进 (in English and Chinese). Translated by Zhang Liqing (张立青). Columbus: National East Asian Languages Resource Center, Ohio State University. ISBN 978-0-87415-349-1.

=== Lexicography ===
- Bökset, Roar (2006). Long Story of Short Forms: The Evolution of Simplified Chinese Characters (PDF). Stockholm East Asian Monographs. Vol. 11. Stockholm University. ISBN 978-91-628-6832-1.
- Handel, Zev (2019). Sinography: The Borrowing and Adaptation of the Chinese Script. Brill. ISBN 978-90-04-35222-3. S2CID 189494805.
- Lunde, Ken (2008). CJKV Information Processing (2nd ed.). O'Reilly. ISBN 978-0-596-51447-1.
- O'Neill, Timothy Michael (2016). Ideography and Chinese Language Theory: A History. De Gruyter. ISBN 978-3-110-45923-4.
- Yip, Po-ching (2000). The Chinese Lexicon: A Comprehensive Survey. Psychology Press. ISBN 978-0-415-15174-0.
- Yong, Heming; Peng, Jing (2008). Chinese Lexicography: A History from 1046 BC to AD 1911. Oxford University Press. ISBN 978-0-191-56167-2.

== Dictionaries ==
- Chinese Academy of Social Sciences, ed. (2016) [1978]. 现代汉语词典 [Xiandai Hanyu Cidian] (in Chinese) (7th ed.). Beijing: The Commercial Press. ISBN 978-7-100-12450-8.
- Hanyu da zidian weiyuanhui, ed. (1995) [1986–1989]. 汉语大字典 [Hanyu Da Zidian] (in Chinese) (Corrected ed.). Chengdu: Sichuan cishu chubanshe. ISBN 978-7-80543-427-8.
