= Galal Walker =

American professor of Chinese language

Galal Walker (Chinese: 吴伟克; born 1943 in Canon City, Colorado) is an American emeritus professor of Chinese language at the Department of East Asian Languages and Literatures and past director the National East Asian Languages Resource Center, the Midwest US–China Flagship Program, and the Critical Language Scholarship Program at Ohio State University.

== Biography ==
After serving in the US Army 1961-64, Walker graduated from the University of Texas and later received his MA and PhD degrees from Cornell University. Walker went on to visiting teaching positions at Chinese universities including Beijing Normal University, Guizhou Normal University, Wuhan University, and Sichuan University. He was a member of both the Board of Visitors and the Defense Foreign Language Institute. Later on, he became Principal investigator and collaborated with other professors in the Department of State Critical Languages Programs, including Christine Su (Ohio University) Indonesian Institute and Mari Noda at Ohio State University.

== Awards ==
In 2003 he was awarded the China Language and Culture Friendship Award by the Ministry of Education of the People's Republic of China and in 2010 the City of Qingdao awarded him with the Qindao Award for contributions to Qingdao culture and education. In 2012, he was honoured with the Walton Lifetime Achievement Award which was presented to him by the Chinese Language Teachers Association and in the same year he was named the Distinguished Service Professor by the Association of Departments of Foreign Languages. He was also awarded with the Critical Languages Award and $9.6 million in prize in the same year.

== Publications ==
Galal used to serve on the editorial board of the Journal of the Chinese Language Teachers Association and was an author of the Design for an Intensive Chinese Curriculum as well as Foreign Language Annals, Shaping the Future: Challenges and Opportunities and Chinese Pedagogy: An Emerging Field, Scott McGinnis. In 2010 he became an editor of Pedagogy of Performing Another Culture, and prior to this was also an editor of the Chinese: Communicating in the Culture which was also released as an audiobook.
