= Hills Learning =

Coordinates: 40.752347°N 73.979180°W

Location
- 551 Fifth Avenue, Suite 1225; New York, NY 10176; USA

Information
- Established: 2009
- Faculty: 40+
- Affiliations: Middle States Association of Colleges and Schools; American Council on the Teaching of Foreign Languages
- Website: Hills Learning

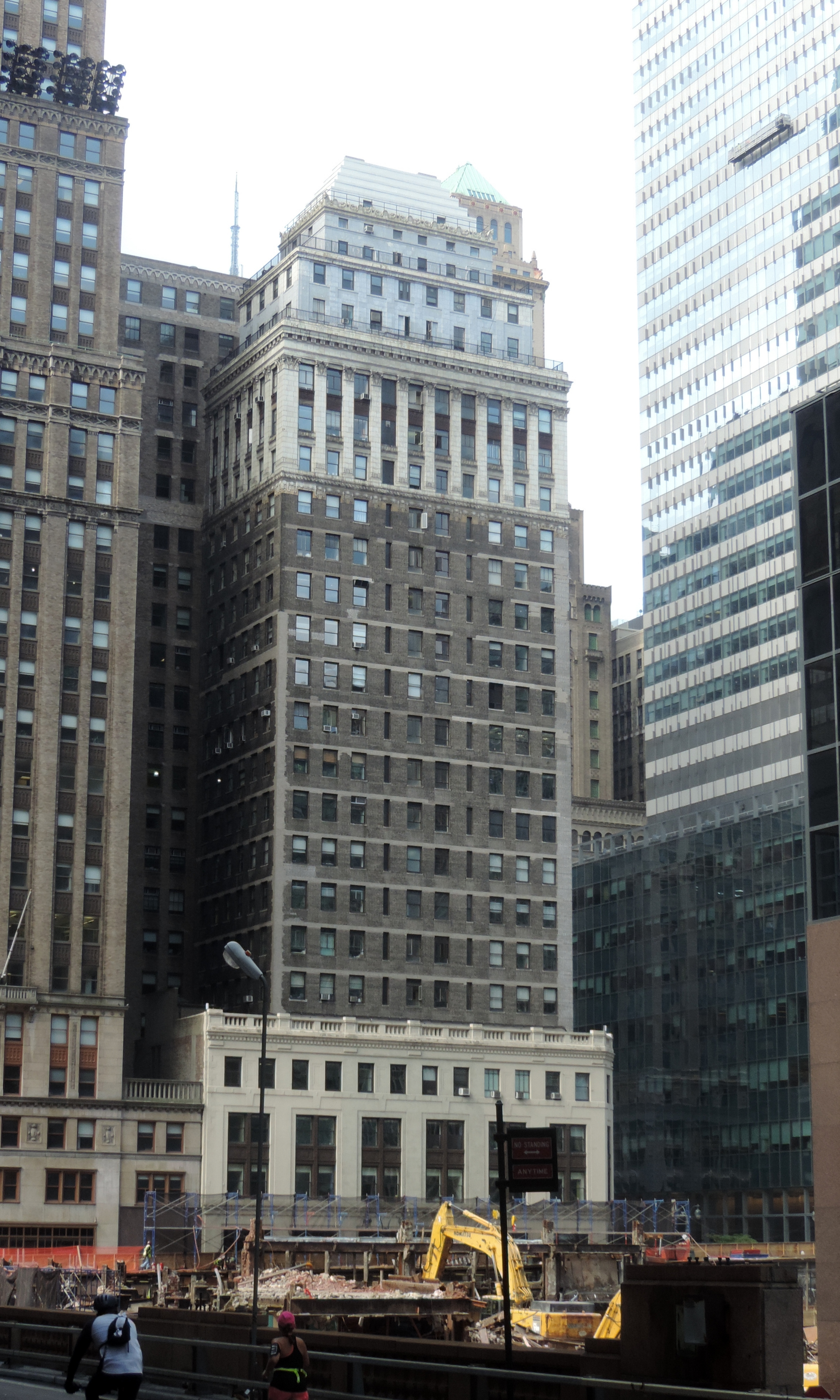
315 Madison Avenue

Hills Learning is an Asian language school in New York City. It is located on Fifth Avenue and has been recognized by several television stations, websites, and publications, such as PBS, TBS, CBS New York, and Chopsticks NY.

== History ==
Hills Learning was founded in 2009 as a foreign language school for private lessons in Chinese and Japanese. By the end of the year, Hills Learning added ESL and Korean to its list of languages and began teaching group classes. As of January 2013, Hills Learning also provides both private and group lessons in Thai and Cantonese. In 2017, classes for Arabic started, and in 2021 Vietnamese also began.

== Organization ==
Hills Learning’s mission is to develop long lasting relationships of language competency and cultural understanding between Asia, America, and the global community.

Hills Learning currently employs over 25 teachers and has programs for over 200 students. Their client list includes fortune 500 companies, public and private high schools, universities, and various other individuals throughout the New York City area.

Jon Hills, director, has been serving since January 2009. Hills speaks Japanese as a second language and knows some Korean and Mandarin. Prior to establishing Hills Learning, Hills worked in financial services, translation, and taught English in Japan.

Hills Learning offers one-on-one and group lessons in Chinese, Japanese, Korean, Arabic, Cantonese, Thai and Vietnamese.

== Recognition ==
Hills Learning has been recognized by PBS in its show “Asian America” and was voted one of the best language schools in New York by CBS New York. Hills Learning was reported on by Chopsticks NY magazine.

== Affiliated organizations ==
- Middle States Association of Colleges and Schools
- American Council on the Teaching of Foreign Languages
- Chinese Language Teachers Association of Greater New York
