= Hangul Day =

Public holiday in North and South Korea

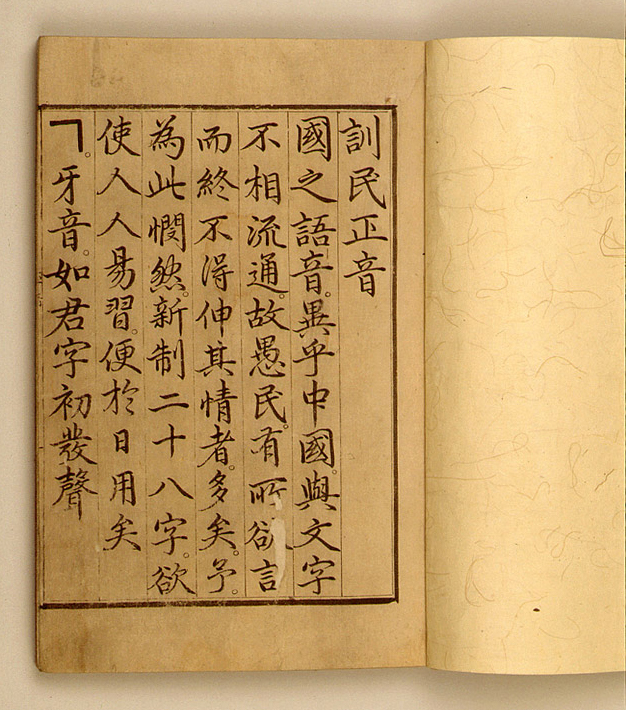
- Hunminjeongeum, the 1446 text that introduced Hangul
- Official name: Hangeul Day; Chosŏn'gŭl Day
- Observed by: South Korea; North Korea
- Type: National, public (South Korea)
- Significance: Commemorates the promulgation or invention of Hangul
- Date: October 9 (South Korea); January 15 (North Korea)
- Frequency: Annual

North Korean name
- Hangul: 조선글날
- Hanja: 朝鮮글날
- RR: Joseongeullal
- MR: Chosŏn'gŭllal

South Korean name
- Hangul: 한글날
- RR: Hangeullal
- MR: Han'gŭllal

Hangul Day, called Hangeul Day (Korean: 한글날) in South Korea and Chosŏn'gŭl Day (Korean: 조선글날) in North Korea, is a holiday celebrating the creation or promulgation of the native Korean alphabet, also called Hangul. The holiday is observed on October 9 in South Korea and January 15 in North Korea.

The holiday was established in 1926 by the Korean Language Society. Its date was set to mark the Korean calendar anniversary of the 1446 publication of the Hunminjeongeum, the text used to introduce Hangul. However, October 9 is only a guess at when Hangul was first published; the actual date is not known with confidence. The celebration date has changed over time.

In 1949, South Korea officially made it a public holiday. It maintained this status until 1990, when it was demoted to a commemoration without time off work. It was made a national holiday in 2005 and was again elevated to a public holiday in 2012.

North Korea celebrates the day on January 15, apparently in honor of Hangul's 1443 announcement. In Yanbian Korean Autonomous Prefecture in China, a "Day of the Korean Language" (Chinese: 朝鲜语言文字日; Korean: 조선어문자의 날) is celebrated on September 2.

== History ==
=== Background ===
==== Creation date of Hangul ====
An exact creation date for Hangul is difficult to determine based on known evidence. The earliest attestation to Hangul is a 30th day, 12th month of 1443 record in the Veritable Records of Sejong. The record documents the initial announcement of Hangul's creation to the court of Sejong the Great. By that time, the alphabet was likely in a mostly complete form. However, the entry only says the announcement was made some time during that month; scholar Gari Ledyard argues that Hangul was likely introduced some day before, and not exactly on, that date. In the Julian calendar, that month corresponds to between December 21, 1443 and January 19, 1444. In the Gregorian calendar, it corresponds to between December 30, 1443 and January 28, 1444.

The promulgation date for Hangul is also unclear. Hangul was officially published in the 9th month of 1446 via the text Hunminjeongeum and its companion commentary Hunminjeongeum Haerye. The Veritable Records of Sejong copy of the Hunminjeongeum is contained in a 29th day, 9th month of 1446 entry. However, that entry says that the Hunminjeongeum was published some time during that month. The Hunminjeongeum Haerye was lost to the historical record and only rediscovered in 1940, decades after Hangul Day's establishment. Its postface is dated to the first ten days (상한; 上澣) of the 9th month of 1446, although it is unclear which of those days it was published on.

==== Korean Language Society ====
In 1908, the earliest predecessor to the Korean Language Society (KLS; then called 국어연구학회; Kugŏ yŏn'gu hakhoe, although it changed names several times thereafter) was founded. Its goal was to research, reform, and promote the Korean language and Korean alphabet (which by then went by various names). In 1910, Korea was colonized by Japan. The KLS continued to operate during the colonial period.

On February 1, 1924 (Note: Per the Gregorian calendar. In the Korean calendar, this is the 27th day, 12th month of 1923. Hangul was first announced, likely in a mostly complete state, some time during the 12th month of 1443. The ceremony had to be on some day that month; they chose the 27th day, as the script was created in (per their reckoning) the 27th year of Sejong's reign, so they felt that number had some symbolic significance. The year of this anniversary was significant, as it was the 8th sexagenary cycle anniversary (8th cycle of 60 years).) the KLS held a celebration of the lunisolar anniversary of Hangul's announcement. This was the first modern ceremony in celebration of Hangul's creation.

=== Establishment ===
The KLS first established and celebrated the holiday in 1926. The holiday was to be celebrated annually following the Korean calendar on the 29th day, 9th month (in the Gregorian calendar, November 4, 1926; falls on different Gregorian dates each year). This date was intended to be the anniversary of Hangul's promulgation. As the Haerye had not been rediscovered yet, they did not know Hangul had been promulgated in the first 10 days of that Korean calendar month, so they arbitrarily chose the last day of the month for the holiday. The holiday was originally called Kagyanal (가갸날; Gagyanal); it was named for the first two characters that appear in tables used to teach children Hangul called panjŏl (반절; 反切).

The first ceremony took place from 6 to 10 pm on that day at a restaurant called Siktowŏn (식도원; 食道園). Around 400 people were in attendance; discussions and lectures were held on the script. For days afterwards, more lectures and discussions were held on the script. All these events were documented with much interest by major Korean newspapers of the time, including The Dong-A Ilbo and The Chosun Ilbo. This led to significant interest in Hangul and the holiday.

=== Early history ===
From the first celebration of the Hangul, the holiday's name (and broadly, Hangul's name) was a point of some contention. Some members of the KLS preferred to call the script "Hangul", while others preferred "Chŏngum" ("Jeongeum"). "Hangul" was mostly popular within the KLS and some other organizations, but not widespread. By 1928, the KLS officially had the name of the holiday changed to "Hangul Day" (한글날).

During the 1930 celebration of the holiday, it was decided to hold the holiday consistently on October 28 of the Gregorian calendar, rather than relying on the Korean calendar. The following year, the holiday was held on October 29, apparently due to confusion over how to convert the Korean calendar date (and whether to use the Gregorian or Julian calendar). In 1934, they returned to using the Gregorian calendar date of October 28.

No official celebrations of Hangul Day were held between 1937 and 1944, as the colonial Government-General of Chōsen tightened its grip on Korea due to Second Sino-Japanese War. In addition, the Korean Language Society incident, which began in October 1942, led to the imprisonment of many of the KLS's members.

Meanwhile, the Hunminjeongeum Haerye was rediscovered in 1940; it was intently studied by scholars. Upon the liberation of Korea in 1945 and the resumption of celebrations of Hangul Day, it was decided to set the holiday's date to the 10th day of the 9th month (the last of the first 10 days of the month), which was October 9 in the Gregorian calendar. This date has remained consistent ever since.

=== History in southern and South Korea ===
1945 not only marked Korea's liberation but also division into the Soviet Civil Administration (SCA) in the north and United States Army Military Government in Korea (USAMGIK) in the south. In 1946, the USAMGIK designated Hangul Day a national holiday. That celebration also coincided with the 500th anniversary of the promulgation of Hangul. A grand ceremony was held from 10 am to 12:30 pm in front of the palace Deoksugung, with around 20,000 in attendance.

After the establishment of South Korea in 1948, on June 4, 1949, Hangul Day was officially made a public holiday (공휴일) for the country, which gave workers the day off work. This was considered to be lower in status than a national holiday (국경일). There was an unsuccessful proposal in 1966 to make it a national holiday. In 1970, a presidential order reaffirmed its status as a public holiday.

While various organizations held their own Hangul Day celebrations, the ones hosted by the KLS were considered to be the primary ones until around 1980. In 1956, after the King Sejong the Great Memorial Society was founded, it began cohosting the event with the KLS. In 1980, the Seoul Metropolitan Government took over the hosting of Hangul Day ceremonies. In 1982, the national government began hosting the ceremonies.

In 1990, in an effort to decrease the number of rest days per year, the national government demoted Hangul Day to a commemoration. This was met with protest and pushback, which continued for years afterwards. On December 8, 2005, the National Assembly voted to make Hangul Day a national holiday (Act No. 7771). The act went into effect on December 29. However, it did not reattain the status of public holiday, meaning people still had to work on the day. On December 28, 2012, it was made a public holiday again (presidential order No. 24273).

=== History in North Korea ===
North Korea celebrates Hangul Day on January 15. While this is apparently intended to celebrate the anniversary of the announcement of Hangul, it is unknown exactly why this date is used, as the announcement date is not known with precision.

=== Elsewhere ===
In 2014, Yanbian Korean Autonomous Prefecture in China designated September 2 as the official "Day of the Korean Language" (Chinese: 朝鲜语言文字日; Korean: 조선어문자의 날).

== See also ==
- Public holidays in North Korea
- Public holidays in South Korea
