= Hyun Bok Lee =

South Korean linguist (born 1936)

CBE Hyun Bok Lee
- Born: October 26, 1936 (age 90); Boryeong, Korea, Empire of Japan
- Citizenship: South Korea

Academic background
- Education: Seoul National University (BA 1959, MA 1961); University College London (MA, PhD 1965)

Academic work
- Discipline: Linguistics

Korean name
- Hangul: 이현복
- Hanja: 李炫馥
- RR: I Hyeonbok
- MR: I Hyŏnbok

Hyun Bok Lee (Korean: 이현복; Hanja: 李炫馥; born October 26, 1936) is a South Korean linguist.

== Biography ==
Lee was born on October 26, 1936, in Boryeong, Korea, Empire of Japan. He graduated with a bachelor's degree and master's degree in linguistics from Seoul National University (SNU) in 1959 and 1961 respectively. He planned to study abroad in the United States and had even received a Fulbright Scholarship to do so, but decided against this due to his mother dying from illness around this time. He instead went to the United Kingdom, where he received a master's degree and PhD in linguistics from University College London (UCL) in 1965. After doing research elsewhere, he returned to UCL as a research fellow from 1969 to 1970. He returned to South Korea and SNU in 1970, where he was appointed an assistant professor. From 1977 to 1978, he was a visiting professor at the University of Tokyo. He was a visiting professor at UCL from 1985 to 1986. In 1999, he was made a Commander of the Order of the British Empire (CBE). He retired from SNU in 2002 and was made a professor emeritus.

In 1962, Lee created a Hangul orthography similar to the International Phonetic Alphabet that was intended for transcribing every language. It is called the International Korean Phonetic Alphabet (IKPA; 한글음성문자).

Lee has had an interest in spreading Hangul abroad. In 1994, he began studying the Lahu language, which is spoken by the Lahu people of China and Southeast Asia. In 2001, he developed a Hangul orthography for Lahu. For almost a decade, Lee taught Hangul to the Lahu. The script saw limited adoption, with missionaries preferring to use the Latin script to transcribe their language.
