= The Chinese Language: Fact and Fantasy =

1984 book by John DeFrancis

The Chinese Language
- Cover of the paperback edition
- Author: John DeFrancis
- Language: English
- Genre: Nonfiction
- Publisher: University of Hawaii Press
- Publication date: 1984
- Media type: Hardcover, Paperback
- Pages: 330
- ISBN: 0-8248-1068-6 (paperback)

The Chinese Language: Fact and Fantasy is a book written by John DeFrancis, published in 1984 by University of Hawaiʻi Press. The book describes some of the concepts underlying the Chinese language and writing system, and gives the author's position on a number of ideas about the language.

== Main points ==
- There is no unique Chinese language. There is a group of related ways of speaking, which some may call dialects, others call "topolects" (a calque of Chinese 方言 fāngyán; DeFrancis uses the term regionalects), and still others would regard as separate languages, many of which are not mutually intelligible. One such variant, based on the speech of the Beijing area, has been chosen as the standard language in the People's Republic of China, and is now known as Putonghua 'common language'. Linguists writing in English often use the term Modern Standard Chinese to refer to the same language.
- The Chinese writing system has a heavy phonological basis, shown in the phonetic elements present in more than 95% of total Chinese characters (not balanced by frequency of use). But some of the simplest characters do not have phonetic components because they are used as phonetic components in other characters, which leads people to believe all characters do not have phonetic components, and the utility of existing phonetic components is somewhat diminished by historical changes in both pronunciation and graphical forms. Even then, DeFrancis estimates that 66% of phonetic elements are still "useful" (pp. 109–110). Many scholars focused exclusively on the semantic elements of Chinese characters, missing the point that phonetic elements are a necessary resource for Chinese readers. The Chinese script is not a brilliant ideographic script; it is a poor phonetic script.
- Although there are characters in the Chinese writing system that visually represent concepts, such as 一 二 三 for 'one', 'two', and 'three', Chinese writing is not ideographic in the sense that the symbols represent ideas divorced from language. There can be no such thing as a completely ideographic writing system, where there would be symbols to stand for all possible individual concepts and where morphemes or phonemes would play no significant role in writing individual words. For instance, most Chinese monosyllabic morphemes are written as phono-semantic compounds (形聲字) that include a non-ideographic, phonetic element.
- The Chinese script, with its huge number of characters, its complexity and its irregularities, is harmful to the literacy improvement efforts of the Chinese society, and needs to be replaced by a more efficient writing system if China is to achieve the benefits of modernization.

== Content ==
The book has an introduction and four sections, with fifteen chapters in total. There are eleven pages of tables of Chinese script. The chapter notes, glossary, index, reference list, and suggested reading list are at the end of the book,

Part I is "Rethinking The Chinese Language". Parts II and III, "Rethinking Chinese Characters" and "Demythifying Chinese Characters", deal with Chinese characters. Part IV discusses "Chinese Language Reform", including DeFrancis's opinions as to what would happen if the misconceptions about Chinese continue. A. Ronald Walton of the University of Maryland, College Park wrote that the titles indicate that the book uses the approach of presenting facts as "counterfacts" to misconceptions about Chinese.

About four-fifths of the book deal with Chinese writing. Part II, Part III, and much of Part IV discuss Chinese writing. Part I has discussion of spoken Chinese.

The book discusses attempts to reform Chinese that occurred in the 20th century, as well as the development-process of Chinese characters over time.

=== Six myths ===
DeFrancis devotes a good portion of the book to attempts at debunking what he calls the "six myths" of Chinese characters, namely:

- The Ideographic Myth: Chinese characters represent ideas instead of sounds.
- The Universality Myth: Chinese characters enable speakers of mutually unintelligible languages to read each other's writing. To the extent this is possible, this is due to a special property that only Chinese characters have. Furthermore, Chinese script from thousands of years ago is immediately readable by literate Chinese today.
- The Emulatability Myth: The nature of Chinese characters can be copied to create a universal script, or to help people with learning disabilities learn to read.
- The Monosyllabic Myth: All words in Chinese are one syllable long. Alternatively, any syllable found in a Chinese dictionary can stand alone as a word.
- The Indispensability Myth: Chinese characters are necessary to represent Chinese.
- The Successfulness Myth: Chinese characters are responsible for a high level of literacy in East Asian countries. (A weaker version of this myth is simply that despite the flaws of Chinese characters, East Asian countries still have a high level of literacy.)

The book devotes separate chapters to deal at length with each myth.

== Reception ==
William G. Boltz of the University of Washington wrote that the majority of the book "is an entirely worthy and satisfactory accomplishment that will reward the general reader and scholar alike" but that he wished that the section on spoken language, Part I, was better developed.

Matthew Y. Chen of the University of California, San Diego wrote that DeFrancis "excels in inventing felicitious examples to illustrate his point" and "has succeeded to a remarkable degree in rousing readers' curiosity and in challenging them to look at Chinese writing in a refreshingly new, often unconventional, and sometimes controversial fashion."

Walton wrote that DeFrancis "admirably succeeded in" simultaneously dealing "with a language tradition stretching back over a millennium" and providing interest for specialists of Chinese, "and has provided some new and invigorating conceptual insights as well."

Stephen Wadley of the University of Washington wrote "The book on the whole is well researched and documented, expertly written and very enjoyable reading-a book that is certainly needed and welcomed."

Florian Coulmas of Chuo University wrote that "His lucid and extremely well-written presentation of the structural and historical peculiarities of the Chinese language provides much more than the necessary context for an appreciation of current language policy issues." Coulmas argued that DeFrancis may have had an impatient tone regarding Chinese literary reform since Chinese characters had been "a central part of Chinese culture".

== See also ==
- Chinese characters
- Varieties of Chinese

== Bibliography ==
- Boltz, William G. "The Chinese Language: Fact and Fantasy (Book Review)." Journal of the American Oriental Society, 1 April 1986, Vol.106(2), pp. 405–407.
- Chen, Matthew Y. (Sep 1986). "The Chinese Language: Fact and Fantasy by John DeFrancis". Language. 62 (3). Linguistic Society of America: 690–694. doi:10.1353/lan.1986.0109. JSTOR 415490. S2CID 143208742.
- Coulmas, Florian. "The Chinese language: Fact and fantasy: John DeFrancis." Journal of Pragmatics, 1988, Vol.12(2), p. 282-287.
- DeFrancis, John (1984). The Chinese Language: Fact and Fantasy. Honolulu: University of Hawaii Press. ISBN 0824808665. Free online at Internet Archive
- Walton, A. Ronald (Summer 1980). "The Chinese Language: Fact and Fantasy by John Defrancis". The Modern Language Journal. 70 (2): 180. doi:10.2307/327338. JSTOR 327338.
- Wadley, Stephen (Spring 1986). "The Chinese Language. Fact and Fantasy. by John DeFrancis". Pacific Affairs. 59 (1). University of British Columbia: 114–115. doi:10.2307/2759019. JSTOR 2759019.
