= Chinese as a Second Language =

- Discipline: Chinese language, Chinese linguistics
- Language: English, Chinese
- Edited by: Dana Scott Bourgerie

Publication details
- Former name: Journal of the Chinese Language Teachers Association
- History: 1966-present
- Publisher: John Benjamins Publishing Company (Netherlands)
- Frequency: Triannually

Standard abbreviations
- ISO 4: Chin. Second Lang.

Indexing
- ISSN: 0009-4595
- LCCN: 88641259
- OCLC no.: 1554364

Links
- Journal homepage

Chinese as a Second Language (CSL), or Hanyu jiaoxue yanjiu meiguo zhongwen jiaoshi xuehui xuebao (漢語教學研究—美國中文教師學會學報), is an academic journal in the field of language education, focusing upon aspects of Chinese as a foreign language, Chinese linguistics, Chinese culture, and Chinese literature. It is published three times a year by the John Benjamins Publishing Company. The current editor in chief is Dana Scott Bourgerie (Brigham Young University).

CSL was launched in 2016 as a continuation of the former Journal of the Chinese Language Teachers Association, or Zhongwen jiaoshi xuehui xuebao (中文教師學會學報), which was first established in 1966 and was published directly by the Chinese Language Teachers Association.

== See also ==
- John DeFrancis
