= John B. Tsu =

Chinese academic and lobbyist

John B.Tsu
- Born: 1 December 1914; Jilin, Republic of China
- Died: 26 February 2005 (aged 80); Daly City, California, USA
- Occupations: professor, lobbyist

John B. Tsu (Chinese: 祖炳民; pinyin: Zǔ Bǐngmín, 1 December 1924 – 26 February 2005) was a Chinese academic and lobbyist for Asians in the United States.

Tsu was born in Jilin Province, in north-east China. He studied law at Tokyo University in Japan, and graduated in 1946. In 1949 he took a master's degree in political science at Georgetown University in Washington, D.C., and in 1954 completed a PhD in the same subject at Fordham University in New York City.

Tsu taught for nineteen years at Seton Hall University in South Orange, New Jersey. He was chairman of the Asian studies department, and director of the Institute of Far Eastern Studies of the university. While there, he realized the shortage of adequate teaching supplies, and in 1961 commissioned John DeFrancis to write his popular series of Mandarin Chinese textbooks. From 1977 he taught at the University of San Francisco. He was later regent of John F. Kennedy University in Pleasant Hill, California.

In 2001 Tsu was appointed chairman of the Advisory Committee on Asian Americans and Pacific Islanders in the administration of George W. Bush. He was president of the Asian American Political Education Foundation in San Francisco.

He died of heart failure in Daly City, California, on 26 February 2005.
