= Hangul typewriter =

Typewriters for the Korean alphabet

In the 20th century, typewriters were adapted or invented to write the native Korean alphabet, which is internationally called Hangul.

== History ==
The first Hangul typewriter, the Wonic Leigh Hangul typewriter, was invented in 1913 by Korean-American Wonic Leigh (이원익; Yi Wŏnik). It was a modified Smith Premier Typewriter 30, originally from 1904. Its keys were in a daseotbeolsik (다섯벌식) layout (five sets of vowels and consonants; multiples to accommodate different character sizes and placements in syllable blocks). It had 84 keys and wrote characters at a 90 degree angle; in order to read the text normally, the page needed to be rotated after writing was finished. The machine is now lost.

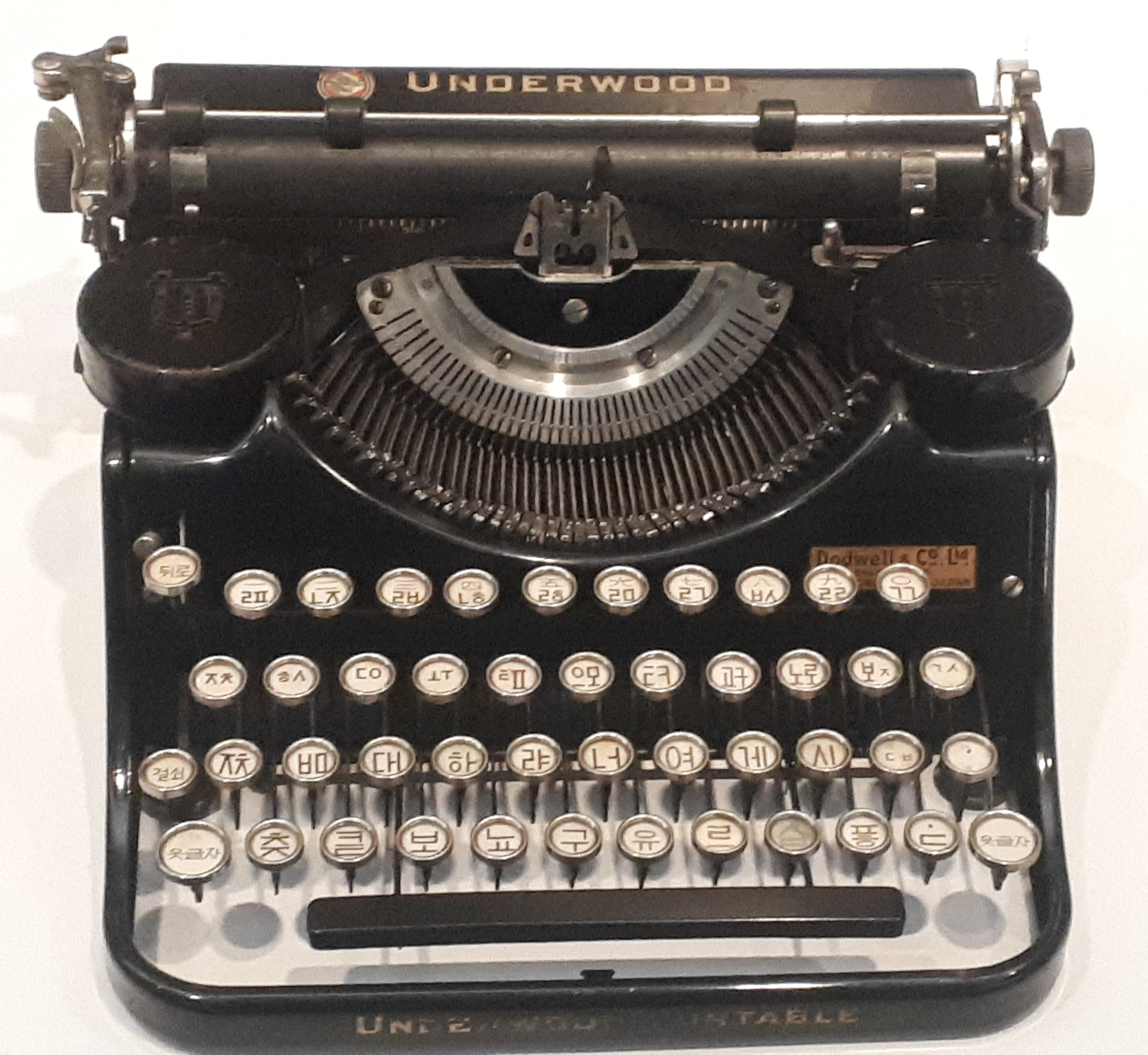
A Keith C. Song typewriter, first released in 1934

The next Hangul typewriter was the 1934 Keith C. Song typewriter, developed by Keith C. Song (송기주; Song Kiju) for the Underwood Typewriter Company. It used 42 keys in a nebeolsik (네벌식) layout (four sets; three for consonants and one for vowels). Like the Wonic Leigh typewriter, it wrote at a 90 degree angle. One surviving model is a National Registered Cultural Heritage of South Korea.

One of the most prominent Hangul typewriters in history was the Pyung Woo Kong typewriter, invented by ophthalmologist Pyung Woo Kong. Kong had developed an interest in linguistics and Hangul thanks to one of his patients, the linguist Yi Kŭngno. He reverse engineered an English-language typewriter and then developed his own for Hangul in 1949. Unlike past typewriters, it did not write at a 90 degree angle; text was able to be read upright while written. Also, its keys were in a Sebeolsik layout (three sets of keys: initial consonants, final consonants, and vowels). His model went on to achieve a degree of popular adoption. The typewriter chose to abandon some sets of keys for the interest of user friendliness, at the expense of lopsided-looking characters. The style of characters produced has been dubbed tallemo (탈네모; lit. 'abandoning the square') and has since become a popular style in its own right, even long after its practical need has faded. Two surviving models of this typewriter are National Registered Cultural Heritages of South Korea.
