= Hangul Jamo Extended-A =

- Range: U+A960..U+A97F (32 code points)
- Plane: BMP
- Scripts: Hangul
- Major alphabets: Hangul
- Assigned: 29 code points
- Unused: 3 reserved code points

Unicode Version History
- 5.2 (2009): 29 (+29)

Unicode documentation
- Code chart ∣ Web page

Graphical representation of the Hangul Jamo Extended-A Unicode block (middle)

Hangul Jamo Extended-A is a Unicode block containing choseong (initial consonant) forms of archaic Hangul consonant clusters. They can be used to dynamically compose syllables that are not available as precomposed Hangul syllables in Unicode; specifically, syllables that are not used in standard modern Korean.

== Block ==
Hangul Jamo Extended-A^{[1]}^{[2]} Official Unicode Consortium code chart (PDF)
	0	1	2	3	4	5	6	7	8	9	A	B	C	D	E	F
U+A96x	ꥠ	ꥡ	ꥢ	ꥣ	ꥤ	ꥥ	ꥦ	ꥧ	ꥨ	ꥩ	ꥪ	ꥫ	ꥬ	ꥭ	ꥮ	ꥯ
U+A97x	ꥰ	ꥱ	ꥲ	ꥳ	ꥴ	ꥵ	ꥶ	ꥷ	ꥸ	ꥹ	ꥺ	ꥻ	ꥼ			
Notes 1.As of Unicode version 17.0 2.Grey areas indicate non-assigned code points

== History ==
The following Unicode-related documents record the purpose and process of defining specific characters in the Hangul Jamo Extended-A block:

Version	Final code points (Note: Proposed code points and characters names may differ from final code points and names)	Count	L2 ID	WG2 ID	Document
5.2	U+A960..A97C	29		N3168R	Kim, Kyongsok (2006-04-23), A Proposal to add new Hangul Jamo extended characters to BMP of UCS
5.2	U+A960..A97C	29	L2/07-076	N3168	Kim, Kyongsok (2006-09-27), A Proposal to add new Hangul Jamo extended characters to BMP of UCS
5.2	U+A960..A97C	29		N3153 (pdf, doc)	Umamaheswaran, V. S. (2007-02-16), "M49.23", Unconfirmed minutes of WG 2 meeting 49 AIST, Akihabara, Tokyo, Japan; 2006-09-25/29
5.2	U+A960..A97C	29	L2/07-103	N3242	Proposed allocation of Old Hangul Jamos in the BMP, 2007-04-16
5.2	U+A960..A97C	29	L2/07-247	N3257	"2", A Proposal to add new Hangul Jamo extended characters to BMP of UCS, 2007-04-23
5.2	U+A960..A97C	29	L2/07-118R2		Moore, Lisa (2007-05-23), "111-C17", UTC #111 Minutes
5.2	U+A960..A97C	29	L2/07-268	N3253 (pdf, doc)	Umamaheswaran, V. S. (2007-07-26), "M50.34", Unconfirmed minutes of WG 2 meeting 50, Frankfurt-am-Main, Germany; 2007-04-24/27
5.2	U+A960..A97C	29	L2/08-003		Moore, Lisa (2008-02-14), "Consensus 114-C28a", UTC #114 Minutes, "Correct the names of 3 Hangul characters as approved by prior WG2 resolution..."
5.2	U+A960..A97C	29	L2/08-318	N3453 (pdf, doc)	Umamaheswaran, V. S. (2008-08-13), "M52.2d", Unconfirmed minutes of WG 2 meeting 52
5.2	U+A960..A97C	29	L2/08-161R2		Moore, Lisa (2008-11-05), "Consensus 115-C15", UTC #115 Minutes, "Approve 4 character name corrections..."
