= Dotum =

Korean typeface

- Category: Sans-serif
- Foundry: HanYang I&C
- Date released: 2000
- Variations: DotumChe

Dotum is a Korean TrueType sans-serif font with a Latin shape similar to that of Helvetica. Version 5.00 of the font is provided as part of Windows Vista, Windows 7, Windows 8, and Windows Server 2008.
