= Kwaraqae =

Austronesian language spoken in the Solomon Islands

Kwaraʼae
- Kwaraqae
- Fiu
- Native to: Solomon Islands
- Region: Malaita Island
- Native speakers: (32,000 cited 1999)
- Language family: Austronesian: Malayo-Polynesian; Oceanic; Southeast Solomonic; Malaita – San Cristobal; Malaita; Northern Malaita; Kwaraʼae

Language codes
- ISO 639-3: kwf
- Glottolog: kwar1239

The Kwaraʼae or Kwaraqae language is spoken in the West, Central & Eastern regions of Malaita Island in the Solomon Islands. In 1999, there were 32,400 people known to speak the language. It is the largest indigenous vernacular of the Solomon Islands.

== Phonology ==
Consonants in Kwaraʼae
		Labial	Alveolar	Palatal	Velar		Glottal
		Labial	Alveolar	Palatal	nor.	lab.	Glottal
Stop	voiceless		t		k	kʷ	ʔ
Stop	voiced	b	d		ɡ	ɡʷ	ʔ
Fricative		(f)	s		x ~ h		
Nasal		m	n		ŋ	ŋʷ	
Rhotic			ɾ				
Lateral			l				
Approximant		w		j			

The /f/ sound is merged with /h/. Most speakers of Kwaraʼae choose to pronounce /h/ as an /f/ sound in some vocabulary.

Vowels in Kwaraʼae
	Front	Central	Back
High	i		u
Mid	ɛ		ɔ
Low		a	

The sound [ə] is recognized as an allophone of /a/. There is vowel reduction, so final /i/ and /u/ are often deleted. Before /i/, the vowel /a/ may become [e], forming the diphthong [ei].
