= Jerome Packard =

American linguist

Jerome Packard is an American linguist specializing in Chinese linguistics and psycholinguistics. He is a Professor Emeritus of Chinese, Educational Psychology and Linguistics at the University of Illinois at Urbana-Champaign. His book The Morphology of Chinese (2000) is influential and widely cited in Chinese linguistics. His more recent book A Social View on the Chinese Language (2021) offers a linguistic introduction to the Chinese language for the general reader.
