= Names of the Korean alphabet =

Chosŏn'gŭl (top) and Hangul or Hangeul (bottom), written in the Korean alphabet

The Korean alphabet has been referred to by various names over time and even currently. It is known as Chosŏn'gŭl (Note: Korean: 조선글; pronounced [tsʰo.sʰɔn.ɡɯɭ]) in North Korea, Hangul internationally, and Hangeul (Note: 한글; English: /ˈhɑːnɡuːl/ HAHN-gool) in South Korea. The script's original name was Hunminjeongeum. (Note: 훈민정음; 訓民正音) It also used a number of other historical names.

== Recent names ==
=== Hangul ===
The term Hangul, also rendered Han'gŭl (McCune–Reischauer) or Hangeul (Revised Romanization), means script of Han, where Han is one of the names of Korea. That name of Korea was popular during the Korean Empire (1897–1910) and colonial (1910–1945) periods, and remained popular in South Korea.

Hangul is a recent name for the script. It is unknown when exactly the name was coined or by whom. Several historians argue the earliest attestation to the term Hangul was on March 23, 1913, when a predecessor of the Korean Language Society changed its name from Paedalmalgŭlmodŭm (배달말글몯음) to Han'gŭlmo (한글모). Korean linguist Chu Sigyŏng was then the leader of that society, so attribution for the creation of the name is often given to him. Chu previously used the term Hannaragŭl (한나라글; 韓나라글; lit. 'script of the land of Han') in 1910; Hangul was possibly derived from this term. The term gained traction in the 1930s.

"Hangul" has become adopted as a word in the English language. Since 2004, "Hangul" has been the main spelling used for the script by the International Organization for Standardization in ISO 15924, which assigns codes to various scripts. Alternate spellings Hangŭl (North Korean romanization) and Hangeul (South Korean Revised Romanization) are also listed. Based on this, linguist Hong Yun-pyo (홍윤표) predicted that Hangul will likely become the dominant name if the Koreas ever reunite.

=== Chosŏn'gul ===
In North Korea, Hangul was briefly used until it was replaced by Chosŏn'gŭl in 1949. This is in part due to differing preferences for names of Korea: North Korea refers to the whole of Korea as Chosŏn, while South Korea uses Hanguk. A joint North–South conference to resolve the differing names of the script reached no conclusion.

=== Other ===
A joint North–South Korea conference rejected a proposal to use the name chŏngŭm or jeongeum (정음; 正音) for the script.

North Korea also uses the name uri kŭl (우리 글; lit. 'our script').

Koryo-saram (Koreans of the mainland former Soviet Union) have used the term Koryŏgŭl (고려글). According to linguist Ross King, the term "Hangul" never appears in any Soviet-era Korean materials.

== Historical names ==
The script's original name was Hunminjeongeum (훈민정음; 訓民正音; Hunmin chŏngŭm; 'Correct Sounds for the Instruction of People'), short name Jeongeum or Chŏngŭm. This was claimed to be the name of the script in the 1443 announcement of Hangul. The script shared the same name as the 1446 text that promulgated it: Hunminjeongeum.

In the Veritable Records, Hangul was frequently referred to as ŏnmun (언문; 諺文; lit. 'vernacular script'). This was a generic term used to refer to non-Hanja vernacular scripts in general; linguist Hong Yun-pyo identified instances outside the Veritable Records where the term was used to indicate non-Chinese scripts used in Manchuria.

Ŏnmun possibly originally had a neutral connotation, as it was used simply as a term to refer to Korean writing in contrast to Chinese, as shown in the title of "Ŏnmun chi"(언문지; 諺文志; lit. 'Treatise on the Korean Alphabet')< published in 1824, but gradually gained negative connotation of "vulgar writing". This was especially so in contrast with Classical Chinese that was referred to as chinmun (진문; 眞文; 'true script') or chinsŏ (진서; 眞書; 'true writing'). Ledyard argues that the name ŏnmun (언문; 諺文; 'vernacular script') for the script was likely not used by Sejong, and that it was retroactively inserted into the Veritable Records of Sejong by anti-Hangul literati. The name continued to be popularly used even into the 20th century. An uncommon alternate form of this name was ŏncha (언자; 諺字) or ŏnmuncha.

Some accounts say that the elite referred to the script derisively as amgŭl (암글; lit. 'women's script'), ahaekkŭl (아햇글; lit. 'children's script'), or chunggŭl (중글; lit. 'monk script'), but several historians argue there is no direct evidence of the use of these terms.

Another rare name was panjŏl (반절; 反切), the Korean reading of the name of the Chinese linguistic system fanqie. This name arose because some felt Hangul's design was similar to that of the system.

Beginning in the late 19th century, around when Hangul finally began to receive government favor, the name kungmun (국문; 國文; 'national script') was used. South Korea's first president Syngman Rhee seemingly preferred this name for the script around the time of the Hangul simplification movement in the 1950s.

During the 1910–1945 Japanese colonial period, the script was referred to as Chosŏnmun (조선문; 朝鮮文; lit. 'Joseon script'; read in Japanese as Chōsenbun), short name Sŏnmun (in Japanese Senbun). Kungmun came to refer to the Japanese script. Linguist Hong Yun-pyo argues that the shift in names was a colonialist effort to elevate the Japanese script and denigrate the Korean one.
