= A. Ronald Walton =

American linguist

A. Ronald Walton (1943 – September 5, 1996) was professor of Chinese language and linguistics at the University of Maryland, who was regarded as an expert in language pedagogy, policy, and planning. He was known for his promotion of the teaching of foreign languages and was the deputy director of the National Foreign Language Center in Washington, D.C., from its inception in 1987 until his death.

== Chinese linguistics ==
Walton graduated from the University of Texas in 1967 with a bachelor's degree in general linguistics, before proceeding to complete an M.A. and Ph.D. at Cornell University in general and Chinese linguistics. He then commenced his academic career by teaching Chinese language and linguistics, specializing in research into Chinese dialectology and phonology. Walton was the deputy director and acting director of Cornell's intensive Chinese language program from 1972 to 1975, before transferring to the State University of New York at Albany, the University of Pennsylvania, and in 1983, to the University of Maryland, where he stayed for the rest of his life. Walton remained a core member of the University of Maryland faculty despite his wide responsibilities in various organizations. He was instrumental in creating the Language Center and was its director from 1991 to 1993. In the Department of Asian and East European Languages and Cultures, he devoted a substantial amount of time to shaping the language curriculum, and to formulating M.A. programs for training language teachers who could understand and attend to the needs of the future. Walton compiled two monographs on Chinese phonology: Phonological Redundancy in Shanghai (1976) and Tone, Segment and Syllable in Chinese: A Polydimensional Approach to Surface Phonetic Structure (1983); both appeared as part of the Cornell East Asia Papers Series.

== Business Chinese ==
In the first part of the 1980s, Walton's professional interests changed direction. He penned a self-study guide to accompany a widely used Japanese language text, before coauthoring a three-volume text, A Course in Business Chinese. Following his completion of the books, he began work as a consultant and reviewer of language curricula and programs, in Chinese and other languages as well. It was in this field that he quickly established a reputation as one of the best in the business.

In 1987, Walton was one of the main forces behind the creation of the National Foreign Language Center in Washington, D.C.. He was the inaugural deputy director, serving in the role until his death. It was in this role that Walton left his deepest imprint on national language policy and standards in the field of foreign language education. Working with ACTFL, the US Department of Education, the College Board, among other organizations, Walton helped to formulate nationwide standards for Japanese, French, Hebrew German, Spanish, Chinese and Korean.

== Other languages ==
As a co-director of the National Council of Organizations of Less Commonly Taught Languages (NCOLCTL), Walton a key figure in creating national teachers’ organizations for African, Southeast and South Asian languages, and Korean. Walton penned ten articles and two monographs on language assessment, policy, and standards; lecturing about these topics on a regular basis. Walton was the main investigator or co-investigator, for more than fifteen major grants shaping a new vision for language in the United States. Despite this, Walton retained his lifelong commitment to his first interest, Chinese language education; at the time of his death he was contracted to Yale University to develop a new textbook in basic Chinese.

== Personal life ==
His mother, Lavera, raised Ron and his sister as a single mom in the late forties and fifties. He married his high school sweetheart, Karen. They were married for nine years and had a daughter, Kris. Walton died of acute coronary thrombosis on September 5, 1996, while visiting his mother in Austin, Texas, at the age of 53.
