= Hangul Jamo Extended-B =

- Range: U+D7B0..U+D7FF (80 code points)
- Plane: BMP
- Scripts: Hangul
- Major alphabets: Hangul
- Assigned: 72 code points
- Unused: 8 reserved code points

Unicode version history
- 5.2 (2009): 72 (+72)

Unicode documentation
- Code chart ∣ Web page

Graphical representation of the Hangul Jamo Extended-B Unicode block (bottom)

Hangul Jamo Extended-B is a Unicode block containing positional (jungseong and jongseong) forms of archaic Hangul vowel and consonant clusters. They can be used to dynamically compose syllables that are not available as precomposed Hangul syllables in Unicode; specifically, syllables that are not used in standard modern Korean.

== Block ==
Hangul Jamo Extended-B^{[1]}^{[2]} Official Unicode Consortium code chart (PDF)
	0	1	2	3	4	5	6	7	8	9	A	B	C	D	E	F
U+D7Bx	ힰ	ힱ	ힲ	ힳ	ힴ	ힵ	ힶ	ힷ	ힸ	ힹ	ힺ	ힻ	ힼ	ힽ	ힾ	ힿ
U+D7Cx	ퟀ	ퟁ	ퟂ	ퟃ	ퟄ	ퟅ	ퟆ					ퟋ	ퟌ	ퟍ	ퟎ	ퟏ
U+D7Dx	ퟐ	ퟑ	ퟒ	ퟓ	ퟔ	ퟕ	ퟖ	ퟗ	ퟘ	ퟙ	ퟚ	ퟛ	ퟜ	ퟝ	ퟞ	ퟟ
U+D7Ex	ퟠ	ퟡ	ퟢ	ퟣ	ퟤ	ퟥ	ퟦ	ퟧ	ퟨ	ퟩ	ퟪ	ퟫ	ퟬ	ퟭ	ퟮ	ퟯ
U+D7Fx	ퟰ	ퟱ	ퟲ	ퟳ	ퟴ	ퟵ	ퟶ	ퟷ	ퟸ	ퟹ	ퟺ	ퟻ				
Notes: 1. As of Unicode version 17.0; 2. Grey areas indicate non-assigned code points

== History ==
The following Unicode-related documents record the purpose and process of defining specific characters in the Hangul Jamo Extended-B block:

Version	Final code points (Note: Proposed code points and characters names may differ from final code points and names)	Count	L2 ID	WG2 ID	Document
5.2	U+D7B0..D7C6, D7CB..D7FB	72		N3168R	Kim, Kyongsok (2006-04-23), A Proposal to add new Hangul Jamo extended characters to BMP of UCS
5.2	U+D7B0..D7C6, D7CB..D7FB	72	L2/07-076	N3168	Kim, Kyongsok (2006-09-27), A Proposal to add new Hangul Jamo extended characters to BMP of UCS
5.2	U+D7B0..D7C6, D7CB..D7FB	72		N3153 (pdf, doc)	Umamaheswaran, V. S. (2007-02-16), "M49.23", Unconfirmed minutes of WG 2 meeting 49 AIST, Akihabara, Tokyo, Japan; 2006-09-25/29
5.2	U+D7B0..D7C6, D7CB..D7FB	72	L2/07-103	N3242	Proposed allocation of Old Hangul Jamos in the BMP, 2007-04-16
5.2	U+D7B0..D7C6, D7CB..D7FB	72	L2/07-247	N3257	"2", A Proposal to add new Hangul Jamo extended characters to BMP of UCS, 2007-04-23
5.2	U+D7B0..D7C6, D7CB..D7FB	72	L2/07-118R2		Moore, Lisa (2007-05-23), "111-C17", UTC #111 Minutes
5.2	U+D7B0..D7C6, D7CB..D7FB	72	L2/07-268	N3253 (pdf, doc)	Umamaheswaran, V. S. (2007-07-26), "M50.34", Unconfirmed minutes of WG 2 meeting 50, Frankfurt-am-Main, Germany; 2007-04-24/27
