= John DeFrancis =

American sinologist (1911–2009)

- Born: August 31, 1911; Bridgeport, Connecticut, U.S.
- Died: January 2, 2009 (aged 97); Honolulu, Hawaii, U.S.

Academic background
- Education: Yale University (BA); Columbia University (MA, PhD)
- Academic advisor: George A. Kennedy

Academic work
- Discipline: Linguist
- Institutions: University of Hawaiʻi at Mānoa; Seton Hall University
- Main interests: sinology, lexicography

Chinese name
- Traditional Chinese: 約翰‧德范克
- Simplified Chinese: 约翰‧德范克
Transcriptions
Standard Mandarin
- Hanyu Pinyin: Yuēhàn Défànkè
- Gwoyeu Romatzyh: Iuehann Derfannkeh
- Wade–Giles: Yue-han Te-fan-k'e

John DeFrancis (August 31, 1911 – January 2, 2009) was an American linguist and sinologist. He was an author of Chinese language textbooks, a lexicographer of Chinese dictionaries, and a professor emeritus of Chinese studies at the University of Hawaiʻi at Mānoa.

== Early life ==
John DeFrancis was born in Bridgeport, Connecticut in a family of modest Italian immigrant origins. His father, a laborer who had changed his name from DeFrancesco, died when DeFrancis was a young child. His mother was illiterate.

== Professional life ==
After graduating from Yale College in 1933 with a Bachelor of Arts in economics, DeFrancis sailed to China with the intent of studying Chinese and working in business. In 1935, he accompanied H. Desmond Martin, a Canadian military historian, on a several-thousand-mile trip retracing the route of Genghis Khan through Mongolia and northwestern China. His book In the Footsteps of Genghis Khan (University of Hawai'i Press, 1993) describes this journey riding camels across the Gobi Desert, visiting the ruins of Khara-Khoto and rafting down the Yellow River. Along the way, he met the Chinese Muslim Ma Clique warlords Ma Buqing and Ma Bukang. DeFrancis returned to the United States in 1936 and did not visit China again until 1982.

DeFrancis began graduate studies in Chinese, first at Yale under George A. Kennedy and then at Columbia University due to Columbia's larger graduate program in sinology. He received an MA from Columbia in 1941, then a Ph.D. in 1948 with a dissertation entitled "Nationalism and Language Reform in China", which was published by Princeton University Press in 1950. He began his academic career teaching Chinese at Johns Hopkins University during the height of the Red Scare, and was blacklisted for defending his colleague Owen Lattimore from unsubstantiated allegations of being a Russian spy, and eventually laid off in 1954.

After an unhappy stint as a vacuum-cleaner salesman, DeFrancis eventually returned to teaching, notably at Seton Hall University from 1961 to 1966, and the University of Hawaiʻi at Mānoa from 1966 to 1976. In the 1960s, at the request of John B. Tsu, he wrote 12 volumes of textbooks and readers for Mandarin Chinese, popularly known as the "DeFrancis series "and published by Yale University Press (), which were widely used in Chinese as a foreign language classes for decades; DeFrancis was one of the first educators outside China to use Hanyu Pinyin as an educational aid, and his textbooks are said to have had a "tremendous impact" on Chinese teaching in the West. He served as associate editor of the Journal of the American Oriental Society from 1950 to 1955 and the Journal of the Chinese Language Teachers Association from 1966 to 1978. The authoring in its first issue a broad mapping of Chinese language and learning challenges.

== Retirement ==
DeFrancis retired from teaching in 1976, but remained an important figure in Chinese language pedagogy, Asian sociolinguistics, and language policy, as well as a prolific author. One of his most well-known books, The Chinese Language: Fact and Fantasy (University of Hawai'i Press, 1984) attempts to debunk a number of what DeFrancis considered "widespread myths" about the language—including what he referred to as the "ideographic myth". Another influential work of his was Visible Speech: The Diverse Oneness of Writing Systems, which addressed more myths about the Chinese writing system, and has been called his magnum opus by colleague Victor H. Mair. DeFrancis spent his final years diligently working as editor in chief of the "ABC (Alphabetically Based Computerized) series" of Chinese dictionaries, which feature innovative collation by the pinyin romanization system.

DeFrancis died on 2 January 2009, in Honolulu, Hawaiʻi, at the age of 97.

== Works ==
John DeFrancis was the author and editor of numerous publications.

=== The "DeFrancis series" ===
Textbooks (Yale Language Series, Yale University Press):

1. DeFrancis, John; Yung Teng, Chia-yee (1976) [1963], Beginning Chinese, Yale linguistic series (in English and Chinese) (2nd ed.), New Haven, CT: Yale University Press, ISBN 978-0-300-02054-0
2. ———; ——— (1976) [1964], Character Text for Beginning Chinese (in English and Chinese) (2nd ed.), New Haven, CT: Yale University Press, ISBN 978-0-300-02055-7
3. ———; ——— (1977) [1964], Beginning Chinese reader (2nd ed.), New Haven, CT: Yale University Press, ISBN 978-0-300-02060-1
4. ———; ——— (1973) [1964], Intermediate Chinese (2nd ed.), New Haven, CT: Yale University Press, ISBN 0-300-00064-2
5. ———; ——— (1973) [1965], Character Text for Intermediate Chinese (2nd ed.), New Haven, CT: Yale University Press, ISBN 978-0-300-00062-7
6. ———; ———; Yung, Chih-sheng (1972) [1967], Intermediate Chinese Reader, ISBN 978-0-300-00414-4 Part 1: ISBN 0-300-00065-0. Part 2: ISBN 0-300-00066-9
7. ———; ——— (1972) [1966], Advanced Chinese, New Haven, CT: Yale University Press, ISBN 978-0-300-00056-6
8. ———; ——— (1972) [1966], Character text for advanced Chinese, ISBN 978-0-300-00411-3
9. ———; ———; Yung, Chih-sheng; Seton Hall University (1968), Advanced Chinese reader (in Chinese), New Haven, CT: Yale University Press, ISBN 978-0-300-01083-1, OCLC 567
10. ———; ——— (1968), Index Volume; Beginning, Intermediate, and Advanced Texts in Spoken and Written Chinese, Yale University Press, ISBN 978-0-300-01311-5
11. Mao, Zedong; DeFrancis, John (1975), Annotated quotations from Chairman Mao, New Haven, CT: Yale University Press, ISBN 978-0-300-01749-6

=== Supplementary series ===
Accompanying Supplementary Readers for the Intermediate Chinese Reader, (Yale University Press, 1976):

1. Ho, Chih-yu (1976), DeFrancis, John (ed.), The White-Haired Girl 白毛女, New Haven, CT: Yale University, ISBN 978-0-887-10116-8
2. ——— (1976), ——— (ed.), The Red Detachment of Women 白毛女, New Haven, CT: Yale University, OCLC 3683318
3. Wang, Hsin-ling; Cao, Xueqin (1976), ——— (ed.), Episodes From the "Dream of the Red Chamber", Yale University, OCLC 228897563
4. Yung Teng, Chia-yee (1976), ——— (ed.), Sun Yat-sen, Yale University, OCLC 729092164
5. ———; Shih, Nai-an (1976), ——— (ed.), Wu Song Kills a Tiger, Yale University, ISBN 978-0-887-10120-5

=== Books and monographs ===
- Chinese Agent in Mongolia, translated from the Chinese of Ma Ho-t'ien (Johns Hopkins Press, 1949)
- Nationalism and language reform in China, New York: Octagon, 1972, ISBN 978-0-374-92095-1
- Report of the Second Round Table Meeting on Linguistics, Language Teaching Monograph Series on Languages and Linguistics, Number 1 (Georgetown University Press, 1951)
- Bibliography on Chinese Social History, by E-tu Zen and John DeFrancis (Yale University, Far Eastern Publications, 1952)
- Talks on Chinese History (with Elizabeth Jen Young) (Far Eastern Publications, 1952)
- Chinese Social History, by E-tu Zen and John DeFrancis (American Council of Learned Societies, 1956)
- Chinese-English Glossary of the Mathematical Sciences (American Mathematical Society, 1964)
- Things Japanese in Hawaii, Honolulu: University of Hawaiʻi Press, 1973, ISBN 978-0-824-80233-2
- Colonialism and Language Policy in Viet Nam, Contributions to the Sociology of Language, vol. 19, The Hague: Mouton, 1977, ISBN 978-9-027-97643-7
- The Chinese Language: Fact and Fantasy, Honolulu: University of Hawaiʻi Press, 1984, ISBN 978-0-824-80866-2
- Visible Speech: the Diverse Oneness of Writing Systems, Honolulu: University of Hawaiʻi Press, 1989, ISBN 978-0-824-81207-2
- In the footsteps of Genghis Khan, Honolulu: University of Hawaiʻi Press, 1993, ISBN 978-0-824-81493-9 – via Google Books
- "The Prospects for Chinese Writing Reform", Sino-Platonic Papers No. 171, 2006

=== Dictionaries ===
Editor of bilingual Chinese dictionaries (University of Hawai'i Press), which are used as databases for software such as Wenlin:

- ABC Chinese-English Dictionary (1996, pocket edition 1999) ISBN 0-7007-1190-2.
- ABC Chinese-English Comprehensive Dictionary (2003) ISBN 0-8248-2766-X.
- ABC Chinese-English/English-Chinese Dictionary (2010) ISBN 0-8248-3485-2

== Reviews ==
- Duncanson, Dennis (1985). "The Chinese Language: Fact and Fantasy by John DeFrancis". The Journal of the Royal Asiatic Society of Great Britain and Ireland (2). Cambridge University Press: 245. doi:10.1017/S0035869X00138912. JSTOR 25211897. S2CID 163296169.
- Chen, Matthew Y. (September 1986). "The Chinese Language: Fact and Fantasy by John DeFrancis". Language. 62 (3). Linguistic Society of America: 690–694. JSTOR 415490. S2CID 145783028.
- Wadley, Stephen (Spring 1986). "The Chinese Language. Fact and Fantasy. by John DeFrancis". Pacific Affairs. 59 (1). University of British Columbia: 114–115. JSTOR 2759019.
- King, Brian (June 1991). "Visible Speech: The Diverse Oneness of Writing Systems by John DeFrancis". Language. 67 (2). Linguistic Society of America: 377–379. doi:10.2307/415119. JSTOR 415119.
- Chung, Karen Steffen (September 1998). "ABC Chinese-English (Alphabetically Based Computerized) Dictionary by John DeFrancis". Language. 74 (3). Linguistic Society of America: 660–661. doi:10.2307/415119. JSTOR 417822.
- Hannas, William C. (December 1991). "Visible Speech: The Diverse Oneness of Writing Systems by John DeFrancis". Chinese Literature: Essays, Articles, Reviews. 13: 119–122. JSTOR 495058.
- Steinberg, Danny D.; Yamada, Jun (1978–1979). "Are Whole Word Kanji Easier to Learn than Syllable Kana?". Reading Research Quarterly. 14 (1). Wiley: 88–99. JSTOR 747295.
