= Chinese Language Teachers Association =

The Chinese Language Teachers Association, USA (CLTA), founded in 1962, is an American teachers' association devoted to promoting the teaching and study of Chinese language and culture. It publishes Chinese as a Second Language (CSL), a leading scientific journal in the field of Chinese linguistics, didactics, and literature. Articles are available on the CLTA's website for association members and in paper form in subscribing libraries. In 2016, the journal CSL was launched as a continuation of the Journal of the Chinese Language Teachers Association (JCLTA). It publishes peer-reviewed original articles in English or Chinese (simplified or traditional characters) that make significant contributions to the theory and/or practice of Chinese as a second language.
