= A History of the Korean Language =

2011 book by Ki-Moon Lee and S. Robert Ramsey

- Author: Ki-Moon Lee, S. Robert Ramsey
- Language: English
- Genre: Historical linguistics
- Publisher: Cambridge University Press
- Publication date: March 2011
- Pages: 348
- ISBN: 978-0-521-66189-8 (1st edition, hardcover)
- OCLC: 712060061
- LC Class: PL909.Y49 2011

A History of the Korean Language is a 2011 nonfiction historical linguistics book by Ki-Moon Lee and S. Robert Ramsey. The book is the first ever English-language book specifically on Korean historical linguistics, and considered to be one of the finest on the topic in any language ever to be published.

== Synopsis ==
The book is organized chronologically, from the origins of the Korean language to the present. It uses periodizations of the language's history that Lee preferred in his previous works and that have since become relatively standard in the entire field. Its coverage of Late Middle Korean, the phase of the Korean language around the time of the invention of Hangul, occupies a significant portion of the book; around half. This is because Hangul provides very good insight into the phonology of Korean around that time. It uses both McCune–Reischauer romanization and a modified version of the Yale romanization system alongside Hangul text.

== Background ==
Around the time of the book's publication, Lee and Ramsey were considered to be among the most eminent scholars of Korean historical linguistics in Korea and abroad, respectively. Prior to the publication of the book, Lee's 1961 Korean-language work Kugŏsa kaesŏl (국어사개설; 國語史槪說; lit. 'An Introduction to the History of the Korean Language') was considered the standard work in the field. That work was translated to Japanese in 1975 and to German in 1977, but had not become available in English. A History of the Korean Language is not only a translation of Kugŏsa kaesŏl, but also an expansion and reorganization of it. Another book, the 1992 A Reference Grammar of Korean by Samuel E. Martin, was previously the only English-language book to cover Korean historical linguistics in depth, although that was not necessarily the primary focus of that book. Ramsey is a former student of Martin.

== Reception ==
Several reviewers found the book to be at once detailed and accessible even to nonspecialists. Linguist Chongwon Park praised the quality of the book's translation. Linguist John B. Whitman argues the book exceeds the quality of its predecessor, Kugŏsa kaesŏl. Linguist Ross King finds the book to be approachable, while evaluating A Reference Grammar of Korean as very difficult to parse. He argues that Martin's book requires "at least a semester-long graduate seminar to train students simply [on] how to use the book".
