= Hangul simplification movement =

1949–1955 movement in South Korea

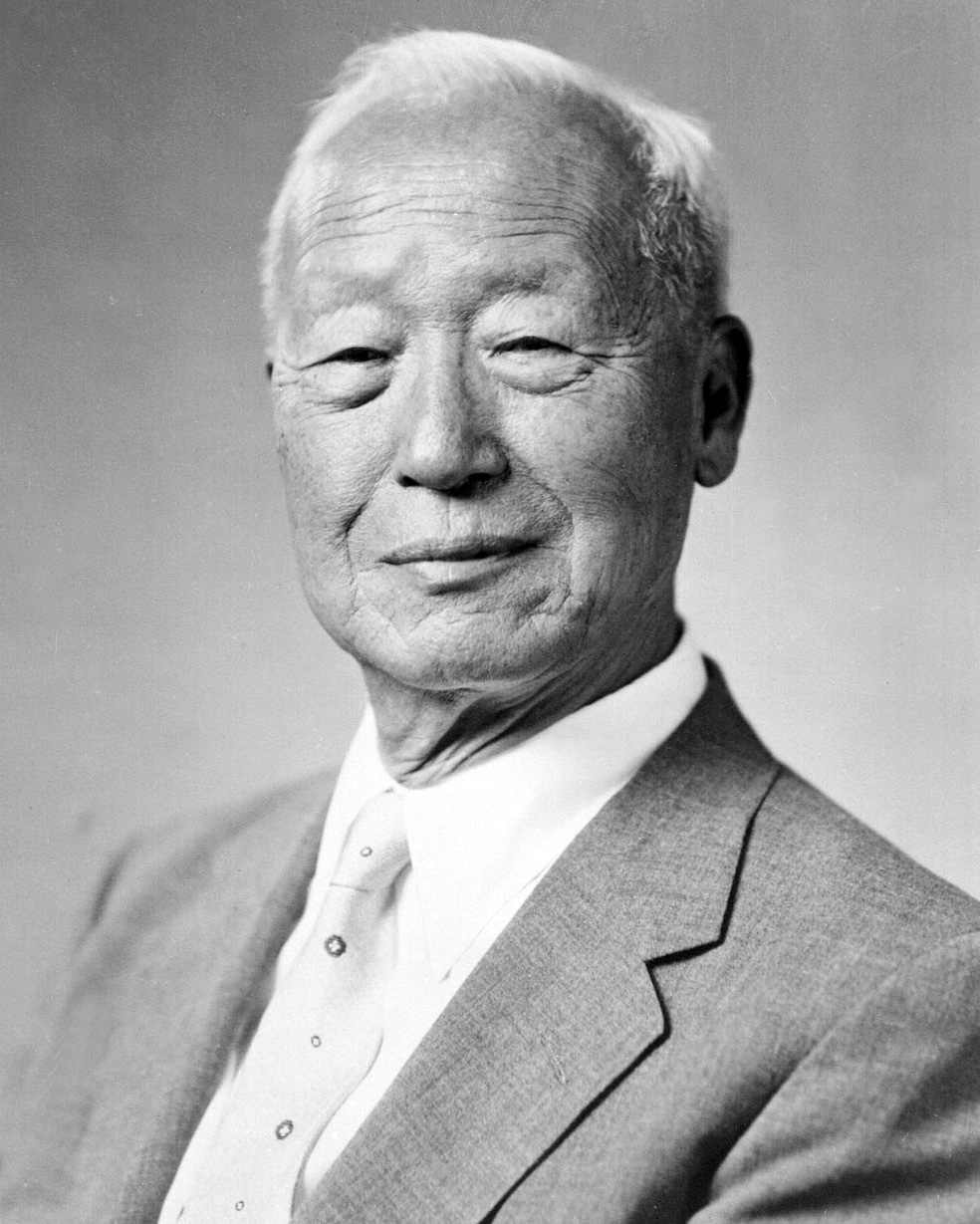
Syngman Rhee, first president of South Korea, initiated the Hangul simplification movement

The Hangul simplification movement (Korean: 한글 간소화 파동), also called Hangul crisis, was a movement that lasted from 1949 to 1955, in which South Korean president Syngman Rhee and some members of his government pushed to reform Hangul, the native alphabet for the Korean language, to an orthography they felt was simpler. Ultimately, while orthographic reform was generally desired by the public, the specific changes proposed by the movement faced too much pushback and its supporters ceased to significantly advocate for it.

== History ==
=== Background ===
Before Hangul's creation, Korea had been using Hanja (Chinese characters) since antiquity. However, Hanja is poorly suited for representing the Korean language, and its difficulty contributed to high illiteracy, especially among commoners. To promote general literacy, Sejong the Great (r. 1418–1450) moved to create Hangul. The script was revealed, likely in a mostly complete form, around 1443 to 1444 and officially published in 1446.

The script was quickly met with pushback, especially from the elite. They argued a native Korean script was too far a departure from Chinese civilization, which they insisted Korea should be deferent to in a Confucian manner. Modern historians have argued that elitism and self-interest were other motivators for the faction; literacy in Hanja was then seen as a status symbol and general literacy was seen as potentially harming the social positions of the elite. Hangul was looked down upon and would not achieve significant government adoption until around 1894, during the Kabo Reform. Around that time, Hangul began to be seen as a symbol of Korean identity and pride.

Hangul orthography has changed over time. Official orthographies only began to be published in the early 20th century. Eventually, the 1933 Unified Hangul Orthography was published, and it became the most popular. Still, its adoption was not universal; even around 1945, after Korea was liberated from Japanese colonial rule, there was significant variety in orthographic practices.

=== Beginning ===
On October 8, 1949, Rhee expressed his desire for a reformed Hangul orthography for the first time. On February 3, 1950, he reiterated his desire to implement orthographic reforms, and warned that resistance would be met with strong government action. With the outbreak of the Korean War later that year, such efforts were put on hold. On April 11, 1953, even before the Korean Armistice Agreement was signed, the government announced that all government documents and textbooks would employ a new simplified spelling system. Historian Michael Kim evaluated the orthography as similar to the 1921 Summary of the Hangul Orthography for Use in Elementary Schools. The announcement was met with widespread anger, even from within the government. The Rhee administration relented and announced that the orthography would be reexamined by a new National Language Review Committee (NLRC; 국어심의회; 國語審議會). On December 29, 1953, the committee concluded that the simplification proposed, as well as other simplifications, were not necessary at that time.

Despite the NLRC's decision, the Rhee administration continued to push for simplification. The debate grew increasingly heated. Two government figures significant in orthographic reform, Choe Hyeon-bae and Kim Beop-rin, resigned from their posts in protest. The government tried to recruit replacements, but failed to in a timely manner. On March 27, 1954, Rhee announced that he would abandon his preferred simplified orthography in favor of one used by Western missionaries in the late 19th century to translate the New Testament. Michael Kim evaluated this as Rhee wanting to return to a spelling system he was personally familiar with. This was again met with backlash; Rhee was accused of acting unilaterally in a dictatorial manner.

On April 21, 1954, Lee Seon-geun was appointed education minister. He quietly pushed forward Rhee's desired reforms. On July 2, he proposed an orthography that was again similar to the 1921 Summary of the Hangul Orthography for Use in Elementary Schools. It was approved by the Rhee administration without changes and announced to the public on July 3. It provoked even fiercer backlash than previous such actions. For example, American linguist in Korea Samuel E. Martin was critical of Rhee's reform efforts; he wrote that the orthography was so confused and haphazard that, if implemented, it would damage the reputation of not only the Rhee government but also all Koreans. On July 14, despite Rhee's Liberal Party holding the majority in the National Assembly, 109 out of 192 assembly members voted to approve a resolution that called for a commission of experts to decide on the orthography issue.

On September 19, 1955, Rhee finally relented and announced that he would abandon orthographic reform efforts. He wrote, "It appears that the practice of writing [Hangul] in a complicated manner has already become an ingrained habit, and many people continue to write in this way... I'm not sure what they see in this practice, but I will not make an issue out of it during these busy times and let the people do as they wish".

A 1953 editorial in the newspaper Kyunghyang Shinmun argued that Rhee's sentiments reflected generational differences around the education of Hangul. People learned different orthographies in school, and some expressed dislike of newer orthographies that they found confusing. Michael Kim evaluated this argument positively.
