= History of Korean =

History of the Korean language

The traditional periodization of Korean distinguishes:

- Old Korean (고대 한국어; 古代韓國語, ?–918), the earliest attested stage of the language, through to the fall of Unified Silla. Many authors include the few inscriptions from Silla in the Three Kingdoms period. Authors differ on whether the poorly attested speech of the Goguryeo and Baekje kingdoms and Gaya Confederacy were dialects of Old Korean or separate languages.
- Middle Korean (중세 한국어; 中世韓國語, 918–1600), corresponding to the Goryeo period (918–1392), when the capital moved from the southeast to Kaesong, and Joseon up to the Imjin Wars (1592–1598). Middle Korean is often divided into Early and Late periods corresponding to the two dynasties. The introduction of the Hangul alphabet in 1446 (early in the Late period) transformed the documentation of the language in comparison with previous systems based on adaptations of Chinese characters.
- Early Modern Korean (근세 한국어; 近世韓國語, 17th – 19th centuries), corresponding to the later part of Joseon.
- Modern Korean (근현대 한국어; 近現代韓國語, from the beginning of the 20th century).

Nam Pung-hyun has suggested that the division between Old and Middle Korean ought to be drawn at the time of the Mongol invasions of Korea (mid-13th century). He divides his extended Old Korean period into Early (Three Kingdoms), Middle (Unified Silla) and Late (early Goryeo) periods.

== Origins ==
Korean and the closely related Jeju language form the compact Koreanic language family. A relation to the Japonic languages is debated but currently not accepted by most linguists. Another theory is the Altaic Theory, but it is either discredited or fringe.

Homer Hulbert claimed the Korean language was Ural-Altaic in his book The History of Korea (1905). The classification of Korean as Altaic was introduced by Gustaf John Ramstedt (1928), but even within the debunked Altaic hypothesis, the position of Korean relative to Japonic is unclear. A possible Korean–Japonic grouping within Altaic has been discussed by Samuel Martin, Roy Andrew Miller and Sergei Starostin. Others, notably Vovin, interpret the affinities between Korean and Japanese as an effect caused by geographic proximity, i.e. a sprachbund.

== Old Korean ==
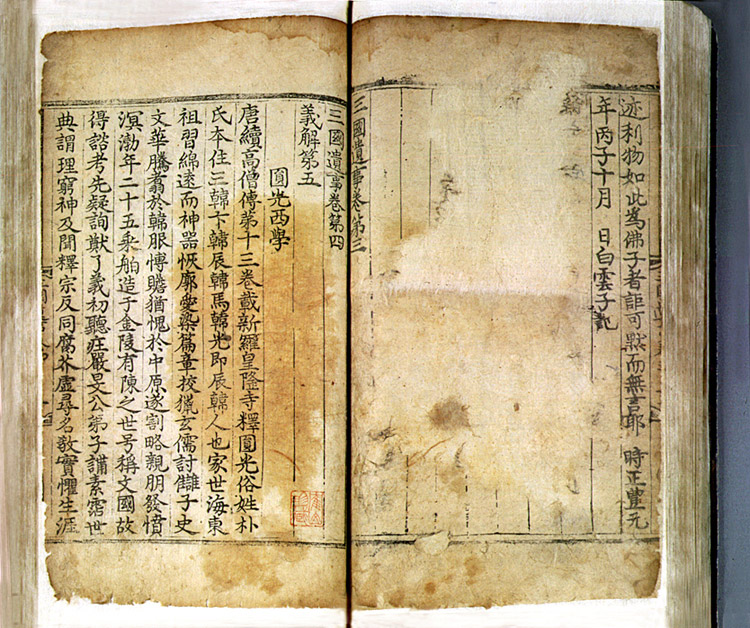
Samguk yusa

Use of Classical Chinese by Koreans began in the fourth century or earlier, and phonological writing in Idu script was developed by the sixth century. It is unclear whether Old Korean was a tonal language. It is assumed that Old Korean was divided into dialects, corresponding to the three kingdoms. Of these, the Sillan language is the best attested due to the political domination of Later Silla by the seventh century. Only some literary records of Unified Silla, changed into Goryeo text, are extant and some texts (written in their native writing system) of the Three Kingdoms period are mostly available in form of inscriptions at present. Thus, the languages of the Three Kingdoms period are generally examined through official government names and local district names. There is very little literature for research of Old Korean. The first texts in Old Korean were written using Hanja to represent the sound and grammar of the local language. Additional information about the language is drawn from various proper nouns recorded in Korean and Chinese records, and from etymological studies of the Korean pronunciations of Chinese characters. Various systems were used, beginning with ad hoc approaches and gradually becoming codified in the Idu script and the hyangchal system used for poetry. These were arrangements of Chinese characters to represent the language phonetically, much like the Japanese man'yōgana.

== Middle Korean ==
A page from the Hunmin Jeong-eum Eonhae. The hangul-only column, fourth from left, (나랏말ᄊᆞ미), has pitch-accent diacritics to the left of the syllable blocks.

The language standard of this period is based on the dialect of Kaesong because Goryeo moved the capital city to the northern area of the Korean Peninsula.

The first foreign record of Korean is the Jilin leishi, written in 1103 by a Chinese Song dynasty writer, Sūn Mù 孫穆. It contains several hundred items of Goryeo-era Korean vocabulary with the pronunciation indicated through the use of Chinese characters, and is thus one of the main sources for information on Early Middle Korean. From a phonological perspective however, the usefulness of this material is limited due to logographic nature of the characters.

The Chinese Ming dynasty Bureau of Translators compiled a Chinese–Korean vocabulary of Joseon-era Korean in the mid-16th century.

There were tones in Middle Korean.

The creation of the Hunminjeongeum ('The Correct/Proper Sounds for the Instruction of the People'), the original name for Hangul, was completed in 1443 by Sejong the Great, the fourth Joseon king, and promulgated in September or October 1446.

Hunminjeongeum was an entirely new and native script for the Korean language and people. The script was initially named after the publication, but later came to be known as "Hangul". It was created so that the common people illiterate in Hanja could accurately and easily read and write the Korean language. Its supposed publication date, October 9, became Hangul Day in South Korea. Its North Korean equivalent, Chosŏn'gŭl Day, is on January 15.

In Korean wiktionary, the pronunciation of Middle Korean is represented by the Yale romanization of Korean. This is because the Revised Romanization of Korean was only designed for Modern Korean. Yale romanization of Korean places primary emphasis on showing a word's morphophonemic structure, so it does not indicate the actual pronunciation of the day.

== Modern Korean ==
Over the decades following the Korean War and the division of Korea, North–South differences in the Korean language have developed, including variances in pronunciation, verb inflection and vocabulary.
