= Hangul orthography =

Writing practices of the Korean alphabet

The Korean alphabet, known as Hangul internationally, Hangeul in South Korea, and Choson'gŭl in North Korea, has had multiple different orthographies. North Korea's current official orthography is called "Orthography" (맞춤법) and is part of the Compendium of Korean Language Norms. South Korea's current orthography is the Hangeul Orthography.

Hangul is also used to transcribe other languages, especially Jeju and Cia-Cia. Orthographies for those languages are fairly similar to those for Korean, although they use one or more additional letters.

== Depth ==
The depth of current Hangul orthographies is a subject of some disagreement. Many scholars argue current orthographies have a relatively shallow or transparent orthography, in that pronunciation generally closely corresponds to what is written. Their complexities are often the product of sound changes in the Korean language over time as well as morphophonemic orthographic practices (changing some spellings to reflect the function or meaning of some words). Some have described current orthographies as deep because of the morphophonemic practices.

== Spelling ==
In general, words are spelled as they sound in the respective standard Korean dialect, with most exceptions being due to morphophonemic word-formation rules. For example, 하늘 (haneul; 'sky') is spelled the way it is pronounced. (Note: There is no need to spell it 한을, as 하늘 is already a whole word and not a stem with particle.) However, 먹어 (meogeo; 'to eat') has this spelling despite being pronounced 머거. This is because it follows a word-formation rule that preserves the spellings of the stem verb 먹 and the particle 어. Other exceptions also exist, for example relating to pronunciation differences between stem words when pronounced alone and when attached to particles that begin with ㅇ.

=== North–South differences ===
Various shared words are spelled differently between North and South Korea. One significant reason for this is the differing standard dialects used. North Korea uses the Pyongan dialect and South Korea the Gyeonggi dialect. Differences arise due to various phonemena, including the initial sound rule, vowel harmony, local pronunciations, loanwords, tensing, compounds, morphological derivation, and the saisiot (epenthic ㅅ).

== Punctuation ==
=== Current punctuation ===
Hangul has used varying punctuation over time and now in both North and South Korea. Modern Hangul now uses a mix of modern Western, Korean, and East Asian punctuation.

==== South Korean punctuation ====
South Korean punctuation largely follows Western practice, with some exceptions. Examples of exceptions include 『 』 or ≪ ≫ (Note: Using the exact characters used on the South Korean orthography website. The National Institute of Korean Language stated that it does not prescribe Unicode code points.); either of these sets of characters can be put around titles of works. Also, the tilde (~) can be used to indicate ranges of numbers or dates, as well as distances.

Spaces are used in Hangul. As with most other scripts, practices around spaces are somewhat arbitrary and ambiguous because it is difficult to define what a word is. Spacing is considered to be one of the most difficult aspects of Hangul orthography; many native Korean speakers do not use spaces properly or sometimes even at all. In general, spaces are inserted between lexical clusters called eojeol (어절; 語節). These lexical clusters can be subdivided into various other categories. Each eojeol can consist of a word and its subsequent corresponding particles or compounds. For example, "학교에 간다" consists of two eojeol separated by a space. The first is "학교" (lit. 'school') with an attached adpositional particle "에". The second is "간다", a conjugated verb.

==== North Korean punctuation ====
North Korean punctuation is similar to Western practice. Differences include the lack of Western quotation marks (e.g. "), which are replaced by guillemet (≪ ≫). Like South Korea, it recommends the tilde (~) for ranges of numbers or dates. Recommendations are also given for vertical writing. Vertical writing punctuation is largely the same as horizontal, but guidance is given on the placement and rotation of some punctuation marks.

North Korean spacing rules result in fewer spaces and more compound words when compared to South Korea's.

=== Historical punctuation ===
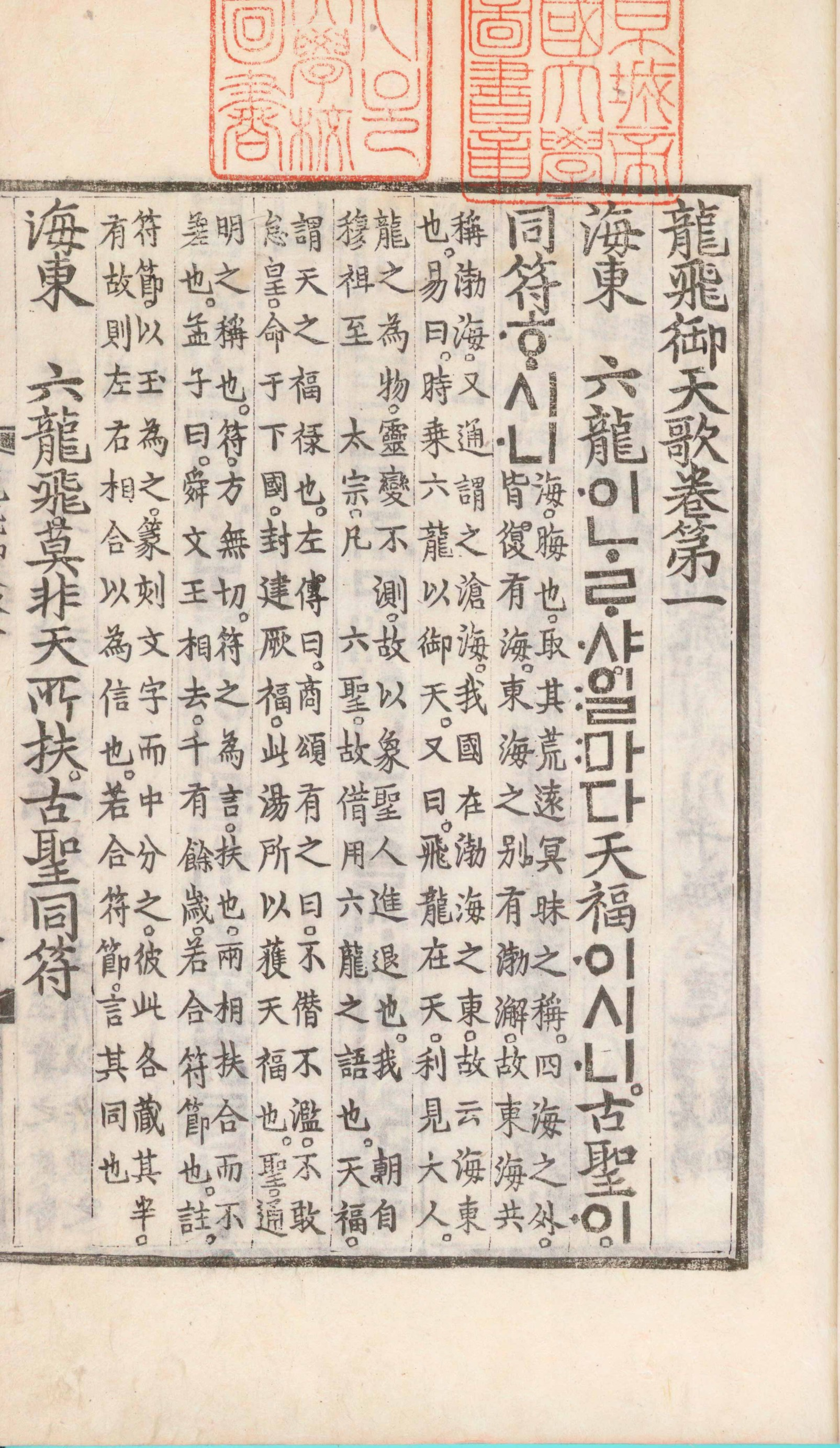
On this page of Yongbiŏch'ŏn'ga, both kuduchŏm punctuation (small hollow circles) and tone markings (dots to left of characters) are in use with Hangul

The original punctuation system was called kuduchŏm (구두점; 句讀點). In the 15th century, a small circle was used to mark major phrasal and sentential/clausal endings. If the circle was placed in the center after a syllable, it marked the end of a major break within a sentence. If it was placed in the right corner of the cell of the final syllable, it possibly indicated either the end of a sentence or a rising tone indicating a pause for that final character.

Some texts, when using Hangul to transcribe foreign languages like Japanese or Manchu, used a variety of relatively unique punctuation for various purposes.

==== Tone markings ====
Tone markings, called pangchŏm (방점; 傍點; lit. 'side dots'), were originally used in Hangul to indicate tones. They were marked by dots to the left of a Hangul character:

- Level tone (평성; 平聲) had no dots
- Departing tone (거성; 去聲) had a single dot ( 〮)
- Rising tone (상성; 上聲) had two dots ( 〯)
- Entering tone (입성; 入聲) does not receive its own dot indication. Hangul's creators argue it is implicit in certain words, but Ledyard reads this as implying Korean doesn't have a specific entering tone.

The writers of the Haerye designed this system because they thought that Middle Korean had tones, similar to those of Chinese. However, a number of modern scholars disagree with this. Several argue that Middle Korean was a pitch-accent language that had pitches, possibly two: high and low. Tone markings were widespread until their decline in the 16th century.

== Syllable blocks ==
Hangul letters are arranged into syllable blocks in a principle called moassŭgi (모아쓰기; lit. 'gathering together and writing'). Each syllable block is broadly divided into two or three components: an initial consonant (초성; 初聲; choseong), vowel (중성; 中聲; jungseong; also called "medial"), and optional final consonant (종성; 終聲; jongseong; also called 받침; batchim). Final heterogenous digraph consonant clusters are orthographically considered to be two different letters combined, but phonologically considered to be a single letter. When no initial consonant sound is needed, the zero initial consonant ㅇ is used.

To construct a syllable block, the following rules are applied in order:

1. Write the initial consonant.
2. Place the vowel depending on the appropriate condition below:
  - If the vowel has a long vertical stroke (ㅏ, ㅑ, ㅓ, ㅕ, ㅐ, ㅒ, ㅔ, ㅖ, or ㅣ), write it to the right of the initial.
  - If the vowel has a long horizontal stroke (ㅗ, ㅛ, ㅜ, ㅠ, ㅡ), write it below the initial.
  - If the vowel is a combination and begins with a long horizontal stroke followed by a long vertical stroke (e.g. ㅢ), place the initial above the horizontal stroke.
3. If there is a non-zero final consonant, it is written at the bottom. If the final consonant is a combination, place the letters side by side.

Assuming consonant clusters are treated as single letters, following the above steps yields the following possible consonant blocks:

| initial | medial |

initial
medial

| initial | med. 2 |
| med. 1 | med. 2 |

| initial | medial |
final

initial
medial
final

| initial | med. 2 |
| med. | med. 2 |
final

Current standard Hangul letters (19 initial consonants, 21 vowels, and 28 final consonants) can be combined to yield 11,172 syllables. (Note: This is derived from multiplying the number of initial consonants, vowels, and final consonants together. Of the total, 399 are just consonant and vowel pairs.) However, many of those syllables virtually never see use in natural language; scholars have argued that only around 2,000 are used in Korean.

Several scholars have argued that the syllable block structure was likely inspired by and makes Hangul resemble the form of Chinese characters, and that their similar form aids compatibility in writing them together in mixed script.

Several scholars have argued that the syllable block structure is a good fit for the phonology and speech cadence of Korean. Several have also argued that the limited number of syllable shapes, with vowels and consonants in consistent positions, makes Hangul easier to read and learn. Taylor and Taylor argue that the syllable block structure is especially helpful to young children learning Korean and for people with disabilities that affect reading.

Some scholars have argued that syllable blocks have the downside of causing orthographic complexity and difficulty with moveable type and computers. In especially the 19th and 20th centuries, these downsides motivated Hangul reformers to debate if the syllable block structure should be abandoned in favor of a fully linear orthography. Such an orthography was called p'urŏssŭgi (풀어쓰기; lit. 'separate and write'). While several p'urŏssŭgi orthographies were developed, none ever saw significant adoption.

== Writing direction ==
Historically, Hangul syllable blocks were arranged vertically (top to bottom, right to left). Over the course of the 20th century, horizontal writing (left to right, top to bottom) became dominant in both Koreas. South Korea allows both horizontal and vertical writing, while North Korea officially prefers horizontal writing. Lee and Ramsey argue that the syllable block structure of Hangul aids the adaptability of the script to both directions of writing.

== History ==
=== 15th century ===
==== Punch'ŏl vs. yŏnch'ŏl debate ====
The punch'ŏl (분철; 分綴) vs. yŏnch'ŏl (연철; 連綴) debate was significant in Hangul's early history. These two terms are used to describe two types of Hangul spelling. Around Hangul's promulgation, two factions emerged that advocated each of these approaches. The yŏnch'ŏl faction produced the Haerye and promoted a relatively phonemic orthography that aimed to more directly tie pronunciation to spelling. The punch'ŏl faction, which included Sejong, preferred a more morphophonemic approach that aims to preserve the spelling of underlying words. For example, when joining the noun "여름" and particle "이", punch'ŏl prefers the spelling "여름이", while yŏnch'ŏl prefers "여르미". These apparent factions used their preferred orthographies in projects they were significantly involved with. Yŏnch'ŏl is easier for new learners of Hangul and Korean, because one simply needs to transcribe what they hear. Punch'ŏl is easier for people familiar with Hangul and Korean, because it preserves spellings based on underlying meanings. By the late 16th century, punch'ŏl was much more popular than yŏnch'ŏl. Some texts around this period that applied a mix of punch'ŏl and yŏnch'ŏl have been described as chungch'ŏl (중철; 重綴). Punch'ŏl eventually won out, and is now the practice in both North and South Korea. Still, modern scholars have debated which approach they think is superior.

In spite of the above disagreement, Lee and Ramsey argue that Hangul in this century was "highly standardized", with "unusually consistent" orthography.

=== 16th to early 19th centuries ===
The 16th century saw a number of changes to Hangul orthography. Various letters gradually ceased to be used, including ㆆ by the start of the century, ㅿ by the 1570s to 1580s, and the doubled characters ᅇ and ㆅ. Tone markings also ceased to be used by around the 1580s.

The 1592–1598 Imjin War caused significant orthographic inconsistency that worsened into the 18th and 19th centuries, with the rise of Hangul popular literature. Consonant clusters were particularly affected, with significant variety in how they were rendered. Also, changes in letter usage that had occurred in the 16th century became cemented in the 17th.

=== Enlightenment and Korean Empire periods ===
The Enlightenment Period in Korean history occurred around the late Joseon and Korean Empire periods; around 1896 to 1910. Around this time, various Hangul reform movements arose, with many persisting into the rest of the 20th century. Collectively, these efforts are referred to as the Hangul Movement.

In 1896, linguist Chu Sigyŏng (1876–1914), who is now often called the "father of modern Korean linguistics", founded the Society for the Standardization of Korean Writing (국문동식회; 國文同式會). On July 19, 1905, the Korean Empire government approved a new orthography designed by Chi Sŏgyŏng: the New Edition of National Writing (신정국문; 新訂國文). It immediately proved controversial and was never fully implemented. To research and potentially resolve the disputes, in 1907, the government established the National Language Research Institute (NLRI). Chu Sigyŏng was a significant voice in the NLRI. The organization lasted until December 27, 1909. While it managed to submit several reports on orthographic reform, Korea's rapidly deteriorating sovereignty around this time negatively impacted the implementation of their work.

Orthographic reform was also sought by the Christian community. In 1902, the missionary community approved a new standardized orthography designed by missionary James Scarth Gale and his Korean assistant Yi Ch'angjik (이창직). However, it was met with backlash from missionaries in the northern regions, who deemed it unsuitable for northern dialects of Korean. It was overturned within months.

==== Moassŭgi vs. p'urŏssŭgi debate ====
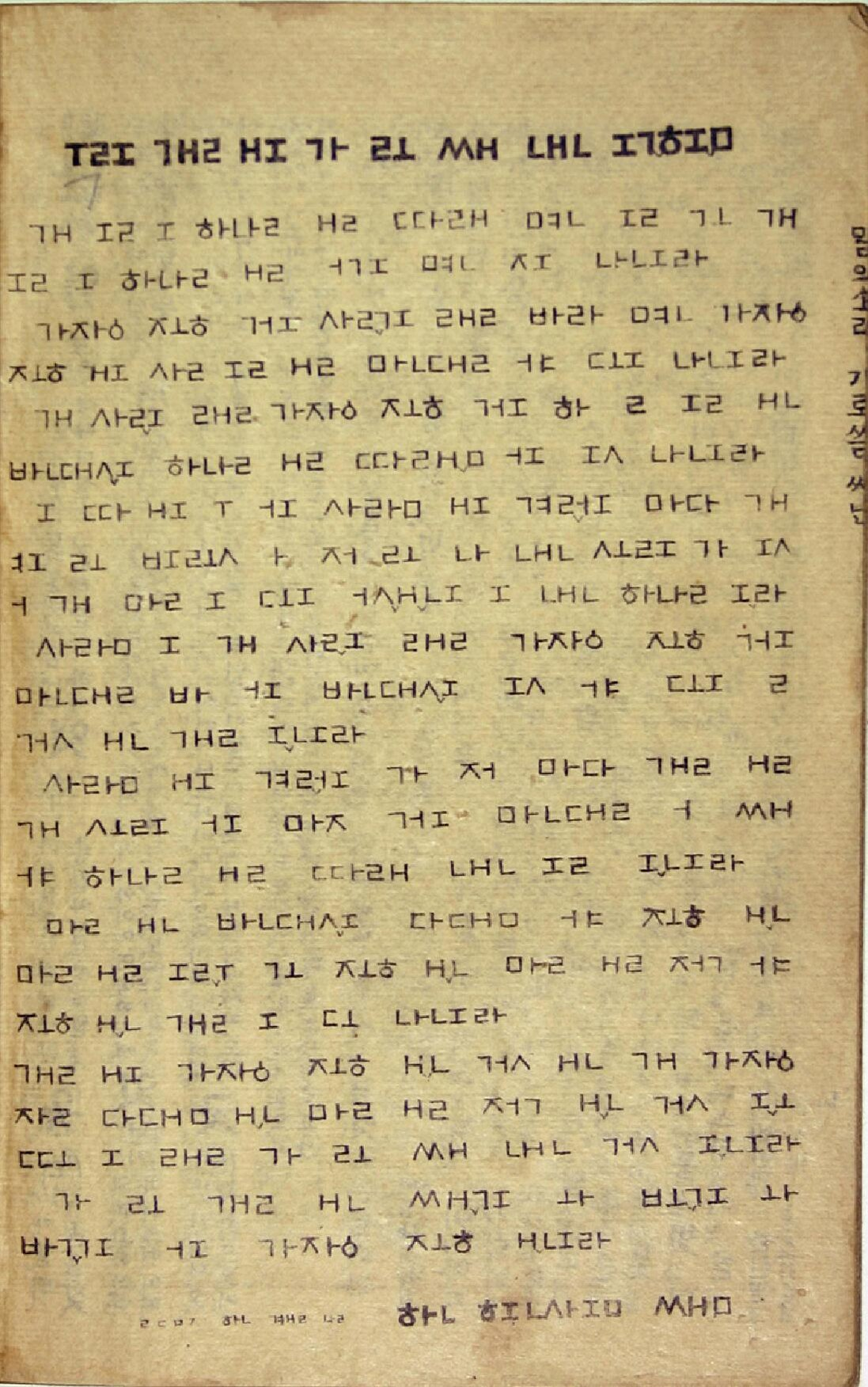
An essay from Chu Sigyŏng's 1914 book Marŭi sori that illustrates his proposed p'urŏssŭgi orthography. In present South Korean orthography, the title reads "우리 글의 가로쓰는 익힘".

Since the 1446 promulgation of Hangul, the mainstream method for writing the script has been to place letters in syllable blocks in a manner dubbed moassŭgi (모아쓰기; lit. 'gathering together and writing'). During the Enlightenment Period, possibly beginning around 1908 during meetings of the NLRI, an idea emerged that Hangul should not use syllable blocks and instead be written completely linearly; this was dubbed p'urŏssŭgi (풀어쓰기; lit. 'separate and write'). For example, "한글" is moassŭgi and "ㅎㅏㄴㄱㅡㄹ" is p'urŏssŭgi. The idea is commonly attributed to Chu Sigyŏng. The idea was apparently inspired by European writing systems. Its proponents argued that p'urŏssŭgi would make Hangul better suited for movable type. Chu did not support the use of p'urŏssŭgi in all cases, and instead only "where it is necessary". Ultimately, the NLRI rejected the proposal.

Chu continued to explore and apply p'urŏssŭgi even after the 1909 rejection. He wrote an extended example of his p'urŏssŭgi orthography in his 1914 work Marŭi sori (말의 소리). After his death that year, his disciples continued to explore p'urŏssŭgi. It was discussed in works by Kim Tu-bong in 1922, Yi P'ilsu (이필수; 李弼秀) in 1923, and by the Korean Language Society in 1936. After the 1945 liberation, some proposed a "half-p'urŏssŭgi" (반풀어쓰기) orthography, where only part of the syllable blocks were linearized.

==== Horizontal vs. vertical writing debate ====
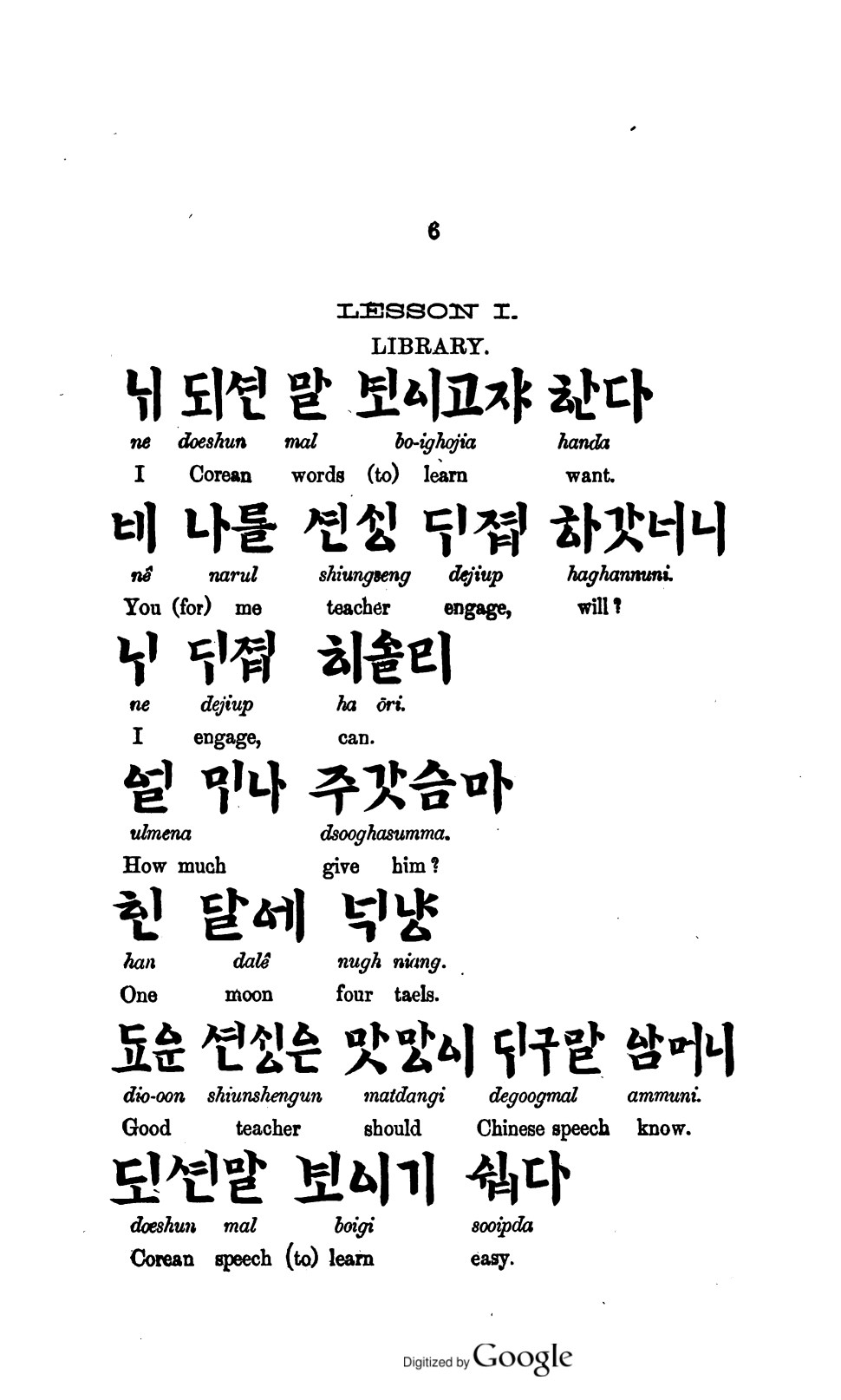
Page of the 1877 Corean Primer by Scottish missionary John Ross: the first Hangul work to use horizontal writing and spaces

Since its promulgation, Hangul was written vertically (from top to bottom, right to left). This has been dubbed serosseugi (세로쓰기). In the 19th century, Hangul began to be written horizontally and left to right for the first time (garosseugi; 가로쓰기). The earliest known work to use Hangul in this manner was Scottish missionary John Ross's 1877 work Corean Primer (조선어 첫걸음). The first work by a Korean person to employ horizontal writing was the 1895 text Kukhanhoeŏ.

==== Spaces and Hangul ====
Until the 19th century, Hangul was consistently written without spaces. Hong argued that the rise of Hangul exclusivity made spaces more necessary. Mixed script works are more unambiguous and thus benefit less from spaces, while pure Hangul works have many homonyms. The 1877 work Corean Primer was the earliest known work to use spaces for Hangul. Spaces began to see significant use with the 1896 newspaper Tongnip sinmun; in its initial issue, it published an op-ed that argued in favor of the use of spaces and Hangul exclusivity.

==== Switching to other scripts ====
A minority of people proposed switching to other scripts, namely the Latin script or Cyrillic script. Proposals sometimes suggested converting Hangul letters to perceived equivalents in other scripts or by simply abandoning Hangul altogether. These proposals never gained significant traction.

=== Colonial period ===
Korea was colonized by Japan in 1910. The first decade of the colonial period saw especially harsh restrictions on the Korean language and scripts. Koreans worked on Hangul orthographic reform in private. Meanwhile, the Japanese Government-General of Chōsen worked on developing its own orthographies for Hangul.

In April 1912, the Government-General promulgated its first Hangul orthography: Hangul Orthography for Use in Elementary Schools. This was the first ever modern Hangul orthography officially put into significant practice. It notably eliminated the use of the araea (ㆍ) in Sino-Korean vocabulary and asked for a dot to be displayed to the left of long vowels. This policy and its successors proved to be controversial; different parties proposed revisions and argued for their own preferred orthographies. The Government-General promulgated a revised orthography in March 1921: Summary of the Hangul Orthography for Use in Elementary Schools (보통학교용언문철자법대요). It completely eliminated the use of the araea and long vowel dot, adopted a free-standing sai-siot (where ㅅ comes between two nouns), and modernized some Sino-Korean spellings. After more complaints and feedback, in February 1930, it promulgated the Ŏnmun Orthography. Linguist Park Chang-won evaluated the various revisions of these orthographies as relatively minor.

Cover of the Unified Hangul Orthography

The Korean Language Society (KLS) had been using its own orthography since at latest December 1926. It also had been advocating for revising the Government-General's various orthographies. In December 1930, they officially resolved to begin work on developing their own orthography. This resulted in the 1933 Unified Hangul Orthography (UHO). The orthography eliminated the use of ㆍ, changed complex consonant digraphs to simpler double consonants (e.g. ㅺ → ㄲ), and permitted the dual function of ㅇ (which had absorbed ㆁ). Its spelling reforms attempted to be morphophonemic. The orthography proved controversial; it received opposition especially from KLS's rivaling Korean Language Research Society (조선어학연구회). The UHO was particularly controversial in the northern regions of Korea, as it was thought particularly unsuitable for their dialects. Despite such opposition, the UHO gradually garnered support. In 1937, the Presbyterian Council of Korea voted unanimously to adopt the UHO, although some members continued to stiffly oppose it. Upon the 1945 liberation of Korea, it became the standard orthography on both sides of the division. The UHO was revised several times before the liberation: in 1936, on March 1, 1937, and on June 15, 1940.

=== Southern and South Korea ===
Upon the 1945 liberation and division of Korea, the UHO continued to be used in the southern half of the peninsula: the United States Army Military Government in Korea (USAMGIK). This was in part because KLS member Choe Hyeon-bae, a central figure in the UHO's design, was placed in charge of education in USAMGIK. The UHO saw three more revisions: on September 8, 1946, on October 9, 1948, and on February 20, 1958. A number of newspaper articles indicated that orthographic standards were in flux in the years following the liberation, with some following the UHO and others following older standards. Mixed script was then the dominant practice in government documents.

Syngman Rhee, first president of South Korea, strongly wished to reform Hangul orthography to a form that he felt was simpler. His reform efforts have been dubbed the "Hangul simplification movement" or "Hangul crisis". After facing continuous and overwhelming opposition to his proposed changes, Rhee ultimately abandoned the movement in 1955.

In 1970, the South Korean government established a commission to develop a new orthography. It conducted a survey for three years (1972–1974). A draft of the orthography was published in 1978. It immediately proved highly controversial and was debated and challenged for years afterwards. Finally, in January 1988 it was announced that the new orthography, Hangeul Orthography, would be officially adopted by March 1, 1989. Several linguists have argued that the draft was largely pushed through in close to its original form, despite the opposition.

From the liberation and even into the 1990s, southern and South Korea had lacked a dedicated government agency to oversee language planning. Such matters were often overseen by the various education ministries and debated by multiple private organizations, particularly the Korean Language Society and the Society of Korean Linguistics (국어학회). In 1990, such language planning efforts were transferred to the Ministry of Culture (predecessor to the current Ministry of Culture, Sports and Tourism), which established the Department of National Language Policy. This organization eventually developed into the National Institute of Korean Language in 1991.

=== Northern and North Korea ===
Writing sample of the North Korean New Korean Orthography, which was never put into effect.

The UHO was adopted by the northern occupation zone: the Soviet Civil Administration. While the USAMGIK in the south made another revision to the UHO in 1946, the North continued to follow the 1940 version until 1954. The North's leader Kim Il Sung was significantly personally involved in language and script reform efforts from early on. In 1946, the Research Society for Korean Language and Literature (조선어문연구회) was established; it worked on matters of language regulation. In 1948, North Korea proposed the New Korean Orthography, a slightly modified version of the UHO, although it was heavily debated and ultimately never put into effect. In 1954, North Korea adopted the Korean Orthography, another slight modification of the UHO. This orthography asked for the replacement of the saisiot with an apostrophe. This system was replaced by the "Orthography" (맞춤법) section of the 1966 Compendium of Korean Language Norms, which reversed some of Korean Orthography's changes. That standard received minor revisions in 1987 and in 2000.

North Korea persisted in using vertical writing for decades after the liberation. Significant linguist Kim Tu-bong was a strong advocate for horizontal writing, but he was purged in 1956. Even as late as 1980, Kim Il Sung expressed his preference for horizontal writing.

=== Russia and the USSR ===
As in Korea, Hangul orthography among Koryo-saram was in flux around the late 19th and early 20th centuries. Linguist Kim Min-su reviewed writings from around this time, and felt that while orthography was in general inconsistent, there were some commonalities, including the 25 letters in use (ㆆ, ㅿ, and ㆁ were not used) and the 7 final consonants (ㄱ, ㄴ, ㄹ, ㅁ, ㅂ, ㅅ, and ㅇ).

In March 1914, the journal Taehanin chŏnggyobo, (Note: Original spelling: 대한인졍교보; 大韓人正敎報. Modernized spelling: 대한인정교보.) which was published from 1912 to 1914 from Chita, Zabaykalsky, outlined the journal's preferred orthography. It apparently took inspiration from p'urŏssŭgi proposals descended from Chu Sigyŏng's. It preferred horizontal writing and p'urŏssŭgi. It proposed a variety of changes, including making the shape of ㅡ curved to resemble that of the Latin "U", the use of a breve (◌̆) diacritic over vowels that were easy to visually mistake (for example, breve over ㅔ to distinguish it from ㅓ and ㅣ together), and the use of hyphens (-) and apostrophes (') in various scenarios. A similar orthography was adopted by the newspaper Sŏnbong.

After the establishment of the Soviet Union (USSR), the korenizatsiia policy, particularly the likbez campaign, sought to eliminate illiteracy through a variety of efforts, including orthographic reform. Such efforts were done on local languages and scripts, including Korean and Hangul. Early in the USSR's history, while many other languages and scripts of the USSR had established experts in Leningrad and Moscow, no such experts existed for Korean and Hangul. Many tasks related to language regulation and orthography fell to Koreans themselves. The first Soviet Korean-language book for adults was a 1925 Korean translation of the text Doloj negramotnost (Долой неграмотность), titled in Korean Musigŭl ŏpsihanŭn charaniŭi tokpon (무식을 없이하는 자란이의 독본). It had its own unique preferred orthography, and bemoaned the lack of orthographic consistency around that time.

Linguist Ross King argued that, while pre-1930 textbooks had relatively consistent orthographies with only minor variations, such variations largely ended with the 1930 publication of Koryŏ munjŏn (고려문전; 高麗文典) by O Ch'anghwan (오창환), which detailed his vision of Hangul orthography and education. King argued it seemed likely O was influenced by Kim Tu-bong's orthographic ideas. Ke Pongu (게봉우) criticized O's ideas in a series of articles in Sŏnbong. After much debate and updates to the orthography, it was functionally approved as the official orthography for Soviet Koreans. The orthography was based on Seoul speech and orthography, although King evaluated it as being noticeably different.

On March 13, 1938, resolution No. 324 of the Council of People's Commissars of the Soviet Union ordered that Korean textbooks cease to be published. After the 1937 forced migration, Korean-language education was discouraged in favor of Russian-language. The newspaper Sŏnbong, which renamed to Lenin Kichi in 1938 and Koryo Ilbo in 1990, continues to publish in Hangul and has served as a center for Koryo-saram Korean-language literature.

=== China ===
Ethnic Koreans in China engaged in their own orthographic reform and language regulation efforts. Around the 1945 liberation, the main orthography in use was the UHO, but its use was inconsistent and there was some dissatisfaction with it. In 1951, they adopted the 1946 version of the UHO. In the mid-1950s, writing was made to be horizontal by default. Newspapers adopted this on March 1, 1956.

== Orthographies for other languages ==
=== Jeju ===
The Jeju language was traditionally not written. Hangul has since become used to write it. Two orthographies are in current use: one created in 1991 by the Jeju Dialect Research Society (제주방언연구회) and another created in 2014 by the provincial government. Hangul orthography for Jeju is relatively similar to those for Korean, with one notable difference being the use of the obsolete vowel ㆍ. Spelling is attempted to be made to be morphophonemic, although there is some uncertainty around how to do this.

=== Cia-Cia ===
In the late 2000s, the Cia-Cia language of Indonesia had a Hangul orthography designed for it by the South Korean private organization Hunminjeongeum Society. It began to be taught to school children soon afterwards. It has remained in use into the 2020s.

The orthography uses a smaller set of vowels: ㅏ [a], ㅔ [e], ㅣ [i], ㅗ [o], and ㅜ [u]. The Hangul vowel ㅡ also appears in some circumstances, although it is not pronounced as it is in Hangul. It is used to represent the lateral sound [l] and to represent initial nasal and plosive sounds (e.g. 응오오; [ŋoʔo]; lit. 'nose'). Vowel combinations are not used.

The orthography uses the archaic consonant ㅸ for the [v] sound. Also, the form 을ㄹ is used to represent an [l] sound, for example 을리마 (['lima]; lit. 'five').
