= Korean consonants =

Korean consonants may refer to:

- Consonant sounds in the Korean language
- Consonant letters of the Korean alphabet (Hangul)
