= Hangeul Orthography =

Orthography of South Korea

Hangeul Orthography (Note: Name translated from the Korean, no official English title.) (Korean: 한글 맞춤법) is the official orthography of South Korea. It primarily regulates how to write the Korean language, particularly the Seoul dialect, using the script Hangul. It was first promulgated on January 19, 1988.

Like North Korea's orthography, Hangeul Orthography is heavily based on the Unified Hangul Orthography, which was originally published in 1933 by the Korean Language Society.

== See also ==
- Hangul orthography – for a description and history of all Hangul orthographies
