= High Korean =

High Korean may refer to:

- Yangban, the traditional Korean nobility

In linguistics:

- Prestige dialects of the Korean language, namely:
  - Seoul dialect, the prestige dialect in South Korea
  - Pyongan dialect, the prestige dialect in North Korea
- Korean honorifics' highest registers
