= Yale romanization of Korean =

Linguistic romanization scheme for Korean

The Yale romanization of Korean was developed by Samuel E. Martin and his colleagues at Yale University. It is the standard romanization of the Korean language in linguistics.

The Yale system places primary emphasis on phonemic orthography: showing a word's morphophonemic structure. In terms of morphophonemic content, the Yale system's approach can be compared to the previously-used New Korean Orthography of North Korea.

This focus distinguishes the Yale system from the other two widely-used systems for romanizing Korean, the Revised Romanization of Korean (RR) and McCune–Reischauer. These two usually provide the pronunciation for an entire word, but the morphophonemic elements accounting for that pronunciation often cannot be recovered from the romanizations, which makes them ill-suited for linguistic use.

The Yale system aims to use a single, consistent spelling for each morphophonemic element, irrespective of context. It represents some back vowels as digraphs rather than using diacritics.

Yale may be used for both Modern and Middle Korean. There are separate rules for Middle Korean. Martin's 1992 A Reference Grammar of Korean uses italics for Middle Korean and other texts predating the 1933 abandonment of the letter araea, whereas it shows the current language in boldface.

== Vowels ==
Yale writes some pure vowels as digraphs. Vowels written to the right in Hangul (ㅏ, ㅓ) are written as a or e, and vowels that are written below (ㅗ,ㅜ,ㆍ, ㅡ) are wo, wu, o or u. Yale indicates fronting of a vowel (Middle Korean diphthongs), written in Hangul as an additional ㅣ, with a final -y. Palatalization is shown by a medial -y-.

Yale romanization of Hangul vowels
Plain		Palatal onglide		Labial onglide	
ㅏ a	ㅐ ay	ㅑ ya	ㅒ yay	ㅘ wa	ㅙ way
ㅓ e	ㅔ ey	ㅕ ye	ㅖ yey	ㅝ we	ㅞ wey
ㅗ (w)o (Note: Since all modern mainland Korean varieties have lost the vowel ㆍ (arae a), the medial w in ㅗ (wo in Middle Korean), can be omitted. It is thus important to consider the time period in question when the romanization is interpreted.)	ㅚ (w)oy	ㅛ y(w)o			
ㅜ (w)u (Note: As ㅡ u does not occur after labial consonants in Modern Korean, Yale abbreviates ㅜ wu to u in this position.)	ㅟ wuy/wi (Note: The spelling wuy is used for Middle Korean forms and wi for Modern Korean forms.)	ㅠ yu			
ㆍ o (Note: These vowels occur in Middle Korean, but have been lost in all modern Korean varieties except Jeju.)	ㆎ oy	ᆢ yo			
ㅡ u	ㅢ uy				
ㅣ i					

== Consonants ==
Yale uses unvoiced consonant letters to write Modern Korean consonants. Tense consonants are transcribed as doubled letters, as in the Hangul spelling. Aspirated stops and affricates are written as digraphs formed by adding h. Middle Korean voiced fricatives ㅸ, ㅿ (bansiot) and ㅇ are written as W, z and G respectively, but do not occur in modern Korean. In the context of Modern Korean, final ㅇ may be transcribed ng.

Korean consonant letters and their Yale transcriptions
		Bilabial		Alveolar		Velar		Glottal	
Nasal		m	ㅁ	n	ㄴ	ng	ㆁ		
Stop	plain	p	ㅂ	t	ㄷ	k	ㄱ		
Stop	aspirated	ph	ㅍ	th	ㅌ	kh	ㅋ		
Stop	tense	pp	ㅃ	tt	ㄸ	kk	ㄲ		
Affricate	plain			c	ㅈ				
Affricate	aspirated			ch	ㅊ				
Affricate	tense			cc	ㅉ				
Fricative	plain			s	ㅅ			h	ㅎ
Fricative	tense			ss	ㅆ			hh	ㆅ
Fricative	voiced	W	ㅸ	z	ㅿ	G	ㅇ	q	ㆆ
Liquid				l	ㄹ				

== Other symbols ==
The letter q indicates what the system calls reinforcement:

- 할 일 halq il /ha**l**lil/
- 할 것 halq kes /hal**k**ket/
- 글자 kulqca /kul**c**ca/

A period indicates the orthographic syllable boundary in cases of letter combinations that would otherwise be ambiguous. It is also used for other purposes, such as to indicate sound change:

- 늙은 nulk.un "old"
- 같이 kath.i /kachi/ "together"; "like", "as" etc.

A macron over a vowel letter indicates that in old or dialectal language, this vowel is pronounced long:

- 말 māl "word(s)"
- 말 mal "horse(s)"

Accents marks are used instead of or in addition to the macron when recording dialects, such as Gyeongsang or Hamgyeong, which have retained tones. Vowel length or pitch accent, depending on the dialect, as a distinctive feature seems to have disappeared, at least among younger speakers of the Gyeonggi dialect, sometime in the late 20th century.

A superscript letter indicates consonants that have disappeared from a word's South Korean orthography and standard pronunciation. For example, the South Korean orthographic syllable 영 (RR yeong) is romanized as follows:

- yeng where no initial consonant has been dropped.
  Example: 영어 (英語) yeng.e
- ^{l}yeng where an initial l (ㄹ) has been dropped or changed to n (ㄴ) in the South Korean standard language.
  Examples: 영[=령]도 (領導) ^{l}yengto; 노[=로]무현 (盧武鉉) ^{l}No Muhyen
- ^{n}yeng where an initial n (ㄴ) has been dropped in the South Korean standard language.
  Example: 영[=녕]변 (寧邊) ^{n}Yengpyen

The indication of vowel length or pitch, and the disappearance of consonants, often make it easier to predict how a word is pronounced in Korean dialects when given its Yale romanization than when given its South Korean hangul spelling.

== High levels of analysis ==
At higher levels of morphological abstraction, superscript and subscript vowel symbols joined by a slash may be used to indicate alternations due to vowel harmony. If used for modern day language, this just means the symbol e/a, though Middle Korean also had the vowel alternation u/o.

An apostrophe may be used for vowel elision or crasis.

- 나+ㅣ = 내 na 'y = nay "my"
- 별+으로 = 별로 pyel 'lo = pyel lo "especially"

Special letters may be used to indicate final consonants in stem changing verbs. In this example, T stands in for the alternation between ㄷ and ㄹ

- 걷다 keTta "to walk" (dictionary citation form)
- 걸어요 keTe/a yo "he walks" (conjugated form)

== See also ==
- Yale romanization of Cantonese
- Yale romanization of Mandarin
