= A Reference Grammar of Japanese =

Japanese language book

- Author: Samuel E. Martin
- Language: English
- Publisher: Yale University Press
- Publication date: 1975
- Pages: 1198

A Reference Grammar of Japanese is a grammar book of Japanese language by Samuel E. Martin. It was published by Yale University Press in 1975.

== Reception ==
The book was described by Masayoshi Shibatani in a 1977 Journal of Linguistics article as "by far the most comprehensive reference grammar of Japanese in the English language (and perhaps in any language)".

A review published on the The Journal of Asian Studies described the book as "a truly monumental work, many chapters of which are self-contained essays full of insights, stimulating ideas, and interesting speculations."
