= A Reference Grammar of Korean =

1992 book by Samuel E. Martin

- 1992 edition cover
- Author: Samuel E. Martin
- Language: English
- Genre: Linguistics, historical linguistics
- Publisher: Charles E. Tuttle Company
- Publication date: 1992
- Pages: 1032
- ISBN: 0-8048-1887-8 (1st edition)
- OCLC: 496704267

A Reference Grammar of Korean: A Complete Guide to the Grammar and History of the Korean Language (Korean: 한국어문법총람; Hanja: 韓國語文法總覧 [sic] (Note: These are the characters on the 1992 edition cover. The 1992 edition cover uses the shinjitai form—considered nonstandard in Korean—for the last character (覧 instead of 覽). The 2006 edition cover has a different typographical error: the last character was replaced with 監 (read 감, not 람).)) is a 1992 nonfiction linguistics book by Samuel E. Martin. It covers the contemporary and historical linguistics of the Korean language.

A Reference Grammar of Korean is one of very few significant treatises on Korean historical linguistics in a Western language.

== Description ==
A Reference Grammar of Korean is composed of two main sections. The first section covers numerous topics in Korean linguistics. Many topics have discussions of how they have evolved across time, from Middle Korean to the present. The second section, the "Grammatical Lexicon", is a 540-page alphabetized listing of grammatical elements.

Korean is transcribed in the book using the Yale romanization of Korean, which Martin himself created in the 1950s.

== Background ==
Martin graduated with a PhD in linguistics from Yale University in 1950. He had specialized in East Asian linguistics, and by the time of his graduation, he was already considered to be a leading authority on the study of Korean and Japanese linguistics. In the 1950s, he developed the Yale romanization system for Korean.

A Reference Grammar of Korean is the culmination of decades of Martin's research into Korean linguistics. He began gathering extensive files on Korean grammar and language history in the 1950s. He began full time research into Middle Korean in the 1980s. Around that time, he acquired computer software for managing and retrieving linguistic data that aided his research.

At the time of its publication, the book was the only major English-language work on Korean historical linguistics, even though historical linguistics was not its primary focus. It continued to maintain this status until the 2011 publication of A History of the Korean Language.

== Evaluations ==
The book is considered to be a monumental Western work in Korean linguistics, although it is little known in Korea. While linguist Ross King praises the work, he evaluates it as very difficult to parse. He argues that Martin's book requires "at least a semester-long graduate seminar to train students simply [on] how to use the book".
