= S. Robert Ramsey =

American linguist (born 1941)

- Born: Samuel Robert Ramsey Jr. 1941 (age 84–85)
- Citizenship: American
- Awards: Presidential Commendation (South Korea, 1998); Tongsung Academic Prize (2010); Precious Crown Medal for Cultural Merit (2013); Ilsuk Award for Academic Achievement (2015)

Academic background
- Education: Georgia Institute of Technology (B.C.E., 1966); Yale University (Ph.D., 1975)
- Thesis: Accent and Morphology in Korean Dialects (1975)
- Doctoral advisor: Samuel E. Martin
- Influences: Samuel E. Martin

Academic work
- Discipline: Linguistics
- Sub-discipline: Historical linguistics; East Asian linguistics
- Institutions: University of Maryland, College Park; Columbia University; University of Pennsylvania
- Main interests: Korean language; Japanese language; Korean dialects
- Notable works: The Languages of China (1987); A History of the Korean Language (2011)

Samuel Robert Ramsey Jr. (Note: Referred to as "S. Robert Ramsey" in official profiles and works. Full name appears here:) (born 1941 (Note: Birth year given in A History of the Korean Language)) is an American linguist. He specializes in the linguistics of East Asian languages, especially Korean and Japanese. He is professor emeritus of East Asian linguistics at the University of Maryland, College Park, where he also served as chair of the Department of Asian and East European Languages and Cultures. He is considered to be a significant Western academic on Korean linguistics. Ramsey is the author of The Languages of China (1987) and co-author of A History of the Korean Language (2011).

== Biography ==
Ramsey first encountered the Korean language when he was dispatched to South Korea in 1966 as part of the Reserve Officers' Training Corps (ROTC). Ramsey received a Bachelor of Civil Engineering degree from the Georgia Institute of Technology in 1966. After graduating from Georgia Tech, Ramsey served as an officer in the United States Army Ordnance Corps from 1966 to 1968.

After military service, Ramsey studied Korean at the Korean Language Institute of Yonsei University, followed by a year of Mandarin Chinese at Taiwan Normal University. He received his Ph.D. in linguistics from Yale University in 1975. His thesis is entitled Accent and Morphology in Korean Dialects and his advisor was Samuel E. Martin. From 1975 to 1984, he taught at Columbia University. He has also taught at the University of Pennsylvania. He received three Fulbright Scholarships throughout his career, including fellowships at Seoul National University (1972–1974) and Kyoto University (1978–1979).

Ramsey conducted original research on a Hamgyŏng dialect, and, by comparing it to Gyeongsang dialects and Middle Korean, reconstructed earlier stages of the language. His subsequent work has focused on the historical development of Japanese and Korean and the historical relationships between the two languages. He is known for his research on Korean dialects and the reconstruction of prehistoric stages of Korean, and has also written on sociolinguistic topics. In 1998, he received a Presidential Commendation from South Korean president Kim Dae-jung for service to the study of the Korean language (대한민국 한글유공자 대통령 표창).

In 2011, Ramsey and Ki-Moon Lee published A History of the Korean Language.

== Awards and honors ==
- 1998: Presidential Commendation from President Kim Dae-jung for service to the study of the Korean language
- 2010: Tongsung Academic Prize from the Tongsung Academic Foundation, Seoul
- 2013: Precious Crown Medal for Cultural Merit (보관문화훈장), the highest level of cultural recognition awarded by the South Korean government, presented by Prime Minister Jung Hong-won on behalf of President Park Geun-hye
- 2015: Ilsuk Award for Academic Achievement (일석국어학상) from the Ilsuk Foundation, for outstanding achievements in Korean linguistics

== Selected works ==
- Accent and Morphology in Korean Dialects (Tower Press, 1978)
- "The Old Kyoto dialect and the historical development of Japanese accent," Harvard Journal of Asiatic Studies 39:1, pp. 157–75, 1979.
- "Language change in Japan and the odyssey of a teisetsu," Journal of Japanese Studies 8:1 (winter), pp. 97–131, 1982.
- The Languages of China (Princeton University Press, 1987)
- The Korean Language (with Iksop Lee, State University of New York Press, 2000)
- A History of the Korean Language (with Ki-Moon Lee, Cambridge University Press, 2011)
- "The Japanese and Their Language: How the Japanese Made Their Language and It Made Them" (Sino-Platonic Papers, No. 372, December 2025)
