= The Languages of China =

1987 book by S. Robert Ramsey

- Cover
- Author: S. Robert Ramsey
- Language: English
- Subject: Chinese language, Languages of China, Linguistics
- Publisher: Princeton University Press
- Publication date: 1987
- Pages: 368
- ISBN: 0-691-01468-X (paperback)

The Languages of China is a 1987 book by American linguist S. Robert Ramsey. Ramsey surveys the linguistic landscape of the People's Republic of China. The work is divided into two parts of roughly equal length: the first demystifies the Chinese language, including its standardization, regional dialects, historical development, and writing system, while the second describes the minority languages spoken within China's borders, including Turkic, Mongolian, Tungus, Tai, Tibeto-Burman, Miao-Yao, and Mon-Khmer language families. Written for both general readers and specialists, the book adopts a sociolinguistic approach that places linguistic phenomena within their historical, political, and cultural contexts. It was among the first general treatments of Chinese linguistics to give substantial attention to non-Han languages, devoting nearly half its content to minority languages. The book's six maps received an 1985 Outstanding Achievement award from the American Congress on Surveying and Mapping, (Note: According to the book's preface (page xi), Ramsey states: "These maps have won the Outstanding Achievement award in the category of thematic maps in the American Congress on Surveying and Mapping 13th Annual Map Design Competition." This is also mentioned in Victor Mair's review in Pacific Affairs where he notes "The six maps by Roy Ashley were justly honored with a special award by the American Congress on Surveying and Mapping," and in Benjamin Wallacker's review which specifies it was the "1985 Outstanding Achievement award for thematic maps.") and the work has been widely adopted as an introductory text in university courses on Chinese linguistics and East Asian studies.

== Summary ==
Ramsey studies the linguistic heritage of China through a sociolinguistic approach that weaves linguistic information into narratives about Chinese history, society, and culture. The work is structured in two main parts of nearly equal length, with 140 pages devoted to the Chinese language and 137 pages to minority languages.

The first part begins with "A Language for All of China." This opening chapter addresses the question of whether Chinese constitutes a single language or a collection of related languages. Ramsey acknowledges that the major Chinese varieties differ from one another as much as the Romance languages do, yet argues that the perception of a unified "Chinese language" among Han speakers reflects cultural and national identity rather than purely linguistic criteria—contrasting China's political unity with the division of Romance speakers into separate nations.

Ramsey introduces this theme by tracing the early twentieth-century movement to establish a national standard language. Here, he recounts the story of the desperate and often farcical meetings organized in Republican China to navigate the many social and political issues involved in such a project. These contentious meetings first produced an unwieldy, artificial blend of North and South that nobody in China actually spoke—or could speak. Finally, in 1932, after two decades of fighting and arguing over minutiae, the delegates agreed to base the new Chinese “national language” (Guoyu) on Peking Mandarin. That worked. But the fighting was still not over! In the heated arguments of the 1930s, Leftists continued to fight against the idea of a “national language,” maintaining that it was elitist. Yet, once the Communist Revolution was over, the new government of the People's Republic of China adopted the same standard language based on Peking Mandarin. The only trace of federalism that remained is found in the new name the Leftists gave this standard language, “Putonghua” ‘The Common Language,’ as a replacement for the name Guoyu ‘National Language.’ But in practical terms, Putonghua and Guoyu are very much the same thing. The second chapter, "China, North and South," explores the fundamental linguistic division between northern and southern China, developing Hashimoto Mantaro's hypothesis that southern dialectal diversity results from the imposition of northern Sinitic languages upon strong indigenous non-Sinitic substrata, while also noticing the remarkable linguistic uniformity of the North. At this point, Ramsey raises the fundamental question of how linguistic uniformity was effected in North China. He notes that “the study of linguistic geography elsewhere in the world has shown that homogeneity of the kind found in North China usually exists only in areas that have been settled fairly recently.” (p. 24) He then asks whether the populations of North China could have moved around enough to homogenize the language. Was the displacement of people in the North significantly greater than in the South? He suggests that linguistic homogenization in northern China should be an important research topic. The third chapter traces the historical spread of northern influence through migration patterns, especially the large-scale population movements between the sixteenth and nineteenth centuries that fundamentally altered regions like Sichuan.

The technical linguistic content begins with chapters on pronunciation and grammar of standard Chinese. The pronunciation chapter not only describes the Peking dialect that forms the basis of the standard language and explains the Pinyin romanization system with its 405 basic monosyllables, but also demonstrates how Chinese children learn to "spell" words using the traditional initial-final method rather than letter names—a system that connects directly to medieval Chinese lexicographical traditions. The grammar chapter begins by challenging the myth of Chinese as a "primitive" language lacking grammatical complexity, then systematically investigates word formation processes and sentence structures.

Chapter six's survey of the seven major dialect groups goes beyond standard phonological and grammatical descriptions to include discussions of changing relative prestige within dialect groups and varying degrees of group consciousness among speakers. Ramsey also includes a complete folktale or conversational excerpts for each dialect, presented in full transcription with parallel Mandarin and English translations, such as the Hakka story "Brother Bored with a Chisel, Mother Worried in Vain," which illustrates both linguistic features and cultural values. The historical linguistics chapter traces Chinese development from Old Chinese through Middle Chinese to modern Mandarin, incorporating discussion of the medieval Qieyun rhyme dictionary and its fanqie spelling system, showing how contemporary pronunciation methods connect to ancient philological traditions.

The writing reform chapter traces the twentieth-century shift from revolutionary ideals of complete alphabetization to the more conservative policy of character simplification, dissecting Zhou Enlai's pivotal 1958 pronouncement while exposing a fundamental flaw in simplification logic—that reducing stroke count fails to reduce complexity when learners must master both traditional and simplified variants of the same graphic elements across different contexts.

Part II's treatment of minority languages begins with considering China's classification of its fifty-six officially recognized ethnic groups and the sometimes arbitrary nature of these classifications within the government's minority policies. The concept of linguistic areas is introduced to explain shared features across genetically unrelated languages. The subsequent chapters organize minority languages geographically and genealogically. Chapter ten surveys northern minorities—Turkic peoples including Uighurs and Kazakhs, Mongolian groups, and Tungus peoples including the Manchus—providing not only linguistic descriptions but also historical context and detailed discussion of indigenous writing systems and literary traditions spanning centuries or millennia.

In the final chapter, Ramsey looks closer at southern minorities and presents the more complex linguistic landscape of Tai languages like Zhuang, diverse Tibeto-Burman groups including Yi and various Tibetan peoples, Miao-Yao speakers, Mon-Khmer languages, and several unclassified or isolated languages. Throughout this section, Ramsey analyzes patterns of bilingualism, linguistic borrowing, and the development of indigenous writing systems in response to Chinese cultural influence. While some treatments are necessarily brief due to limited source materials for certain languages and their speakers, text samples and cultural observations are sometimes provided in the text.

== Critics ==
Robert Hymes found the book refreshing among general introductions to Chinese language. Hymes praised the concrete approach and consistent attention to social and political contexts rather than just linguistic technicalities. He was convinced by Ramsey's sociolinguistic argument that defended the Chinese view of their speech varieties as forms of one language rather than separate languages—a position that changed Hymes's own initial prejudices as a social historian. Hymes valued the unusual inclusion of folktales and conversational excerpts with full transcriptions and literal translations for each dialect, which introduced readers not just to languages but to the people who spoke them.

Jerome L. Packard praised Ramsey for successfully presenting China's linguistic diversity within meaningful historical, geographical, and social contexts. Packard admired how Ramsey made grammatical descriptions palatable by viewing language distribution as a reflection of China's history, society, and geography. He called the book's treatment of Chinese historical linguistics the best account written for non-specialists at that time, and valued the inclusion of specific details like Hashimoto Mantaro's hypothesis about southern dialect diversity resulting from northern Sinitic languages imposing themselves on indigenous non-Sinitic substrata. While Packard criticized the absence of in-text citations (which forced readers to match endnotes carefully) and found the maps difficult to interpret due to similar color shadings, he believed that Ramsey succeeded in achieving the goal of producing a comprehensive and accurate account that placed China's linguistic diversity in proper context.

W. South Coblin found the book successful in its primary goal of providing educated general readers with an introduction to most languages of China, though he identified what he considered significant technical problems throughout. He praised several chapters for raising interesting and useful questions, particularly the examination of whether populations in North China moved enough to homogenize the language and the important observation about Karlgren's reconstructive technique being a hybrid that combined Western comparative methods with Chinese philological traditions. While he considered the six maps of exceptional quality and the book technically well-produced overall, Coblin pointed to a moderate number of printing and editorial errors that ranged from occasionally bothersome typographical mistakes to more serious technical inaccuracies in linguistic explanations. He warned that these errors would confuse general readers and could prove "disastrously misleading" for students taking introductory courses, stating such mistakes "should not appear in a basic sourcebook." Coblin particularly regretted the decision to exclude Tibetan from the minority languages section, arguing this omission made lay readers suffer and left them to find the material themselves. He doubted the book would convey much new information to Sinologists about their own discipline, contrary to what the dust jacket suggested, but thought that the work could serve in introductory courses and would prove useful to China specialists unfamiliar with Tibeto-Burman studies or Altaistics.

Victor H. Mair initially felt excited seeing the book's title, hoping it would confront what he called "the pernicious myth" of a single Chinese language, but felt disappointed when he discovered the plural referred to one supposedly unified Chinese language plus numerous minority languages. He criticized Ramsey for accepting politically laden terminology current in China that he considered harmful to linguistic science, noting that Ramsey admitted from his preface's first paragraph that "extralinguistic factors" were prime considerations in his analysis. While Mair acknowledged that Ramsey recognized he was conducting cultural exegesis rather than pure linguistics and credited him for admitting this upfront, he pointed out that many authorities remained unaware of the gap between their ideologically conditioned descriptions and actual linguistic conditions in China. Despite these fundamental objections, Mair found the book "a pleasure in virtually all respects," praising it as extremely easy to read, full of useful information, and beautifully produced.

Jeroen Wiedenhof reviewed the book alongside Jerry Norman's Chinese (Cambridge University Press, 1988). Wiedenhof mentioned these two general introductions to Chinese linguistics appeared within one year of each other, both aimed at non-specialists as well as students and scholars. He welcomed Ramsey's book for its refreshing multidisciplinary approach and attention to social and political contexts. Wiedenhof thought that its systematic treatment of both Chinese and non-Chinese minority languages made it valuable for a broad readership.

Dayle Barnes considered the work an outstanding achievement that succeeded in making complex linguistic material accessible through clear, conversational prose. Barnes valued the book's sociolinguistic approach, which studied not just the technical aspects of Chinese languages but also the cultural attitudes and social contexts that shaped them. He highlighted how skillfully Ramsey presented the Chinese perspective on their writing system and language policies, insisting that these sections contained some of the most compelling explanations available anywhere. While Barnes identified minor factual issues regarding voiced consonants and certain grammatical points that puzzled him, he considered these trivial concerns against the book's broader accomplishments.

To Daniel Kane, the book is a useful introductory survey that succeeded in its educational mission despite certain limitations. Kane appreciated the book's conversational tone and anecdotal approach, which he thought would attract students to the field of Chinese linguistics. While he considered the work lightweight and thought that most of its information could be found in other readily available sources, he acknowledged its value in assembling material about minority languages not normally encountered in standard linguistic descriptions. Kane found the sections on minority languages useful since they would likely prove new to tertiary teachers of Chinese. He praised the minimal use of linguistic jargon and confirmed he found no factual errors in the text. Despite mentioning that several competing books appeared around the same time with overlapping content, Kane concluded it served well as a first point of reference for its intended audience.

Charles N. Li praised it as a unique and brilliant work that stood out among other books on Chinese. Li commended Ramsey for successfully avoiding dullness by presenting linguistic information through the lens of China's history, culture, geography, and people, hence making the reading both informative and enlightening for specialists and non-linguists alike. Li found Part 1 on the Chinese language exemplary. He thought that Ramsey integrated modern research results and presented them in a concise, interesting, and comprehensible manner with accurate and comprehensive treatment of even technical aspects like grammar. While Li acknowledged that Part 2 on minority languages contained some factual errors—citing four specific examples such as the omission of Korean speakers in China and incorrect characterizations of certain Altaic language features—he believed that it did not diminish the book's overall value.

Benjamin E. Wallacker considered the work a masterful synthesis that consulted extensive scholarship and numerous scholars to produce a practical guide to the linguistic identities of China's officially recognized ethnic groups. Wallacker welcomed how Ramsey extracted diagnostic features from complex phonological and grammatical details, therefore making dialectal distinctions accessible to casual students, and how the author condensed massive amounts of information into manageable portions. The reviewer found the text informative across all sections—from the lucid descriptions of Chinese language varieties to the systematic sketch of historical phonology, and from the thoughtful chapter on script reform to the thorough coverage of minority languages.

In his review of the book alongside Jerry Norman's Chinese, Edwin G. Pulleyblank acknowledged its engaging, anecdotal style that would entertain readers, but he questioned several editorial decisions, especially the omission of Tibetan (despite its historical and cultural importance in East Asia) while devoting extensive coverage to Altaic languages that had equally peripheral relationships to Chinese. He found Ramsey's section on minority languages informative though necessarily sketchy, and appreciated the inclusion of folksy conversational excerpts that introduced readers not just to languages but to the people who spoke them.

== Translations ==
The book has been translated into Japanese as Chūgoku no Shogengo: Rekishi to Genkyō (中国の諸言語―歴史と現況) by Takada Tokio (高田時雄) and Atsuji Tetsuji (阿辻哲次). It was published by Taishūkan Shoten in November 1990.
