= Compendium of Korean Language Norms =

Language regulations of North Korea

The Compendium of Korean Language Norms (Korean: 조선말규범집) is a compilation of language regulations used in North Korea. They primarily regulate the Korean language (using the Pyongyang dialect as the standard) and use of the script Hangul (called Chosŏn'gŭl; 조선글) in North Korea. It was originally published in June 1966 and revised in 1987 and 2010.

Like South Korea's Hangeul Orthography, the Compendium takes heavy inspiration from the Unified Hangul Orthography (UHO), which was originally published in 1933 by the Korean Language Society. North Korea used the UHO (specifically the 1940 and then 1946 revisions) until 1954, when it adopted an orthography called "Korean Orthography". That orthography was then replaced by the Compendium in 1966.

The Compendium consists of several sections. The longest and most prominent section, "Orthography" (맞춤법), regulates the orthography of Hangul for the country. Other sections include Spacing Rules (띄여쓰기규정), Punctuation Rules (문장부호법), and Cultured Language Pronunciation (문화어발음법; "Cultured Language" refers to the Pyongyang dialect).

Korean Chinese people have a similar set of language regulations, which were in fact based on North Korea's, that also goes by the name "Compendium of Korean Language Norms".

== See also ==
- Hangul orthography – for orthographies of Hangul in general, including a history of North Korea's
