= Lee Seon-geun =

South Korean politician (1905–1983)

- 이선근
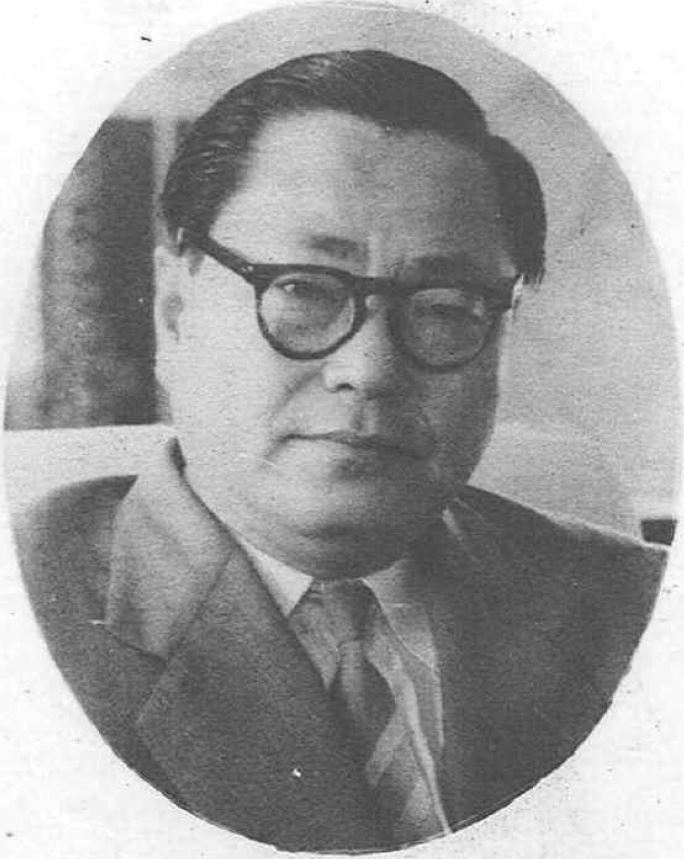

4th Minister of Education of the Republic of Korea
- In office April 21, 1954 – June 7, 1956
- Vice President: Ham Tae-young

Personal details
- Born: May 11, 1905 Kaesong, Gyeonggi Province, Korean Empire
- Died: January 9, 1983 (aged 77) Incheon, South Korea
- Party: Independent

Lee Seon-geun (Korean: 이선근; May 11, 1905 – January 9, 1983) was a South Korean politician. He served as the 4th Minister of Education of the Republic of Korea.

== Biography ==
Born in Kaesong, Gyeonggi Province, into a wealthy family. After graduating from Ssangbin Uisuk and graduating from the Whimoon High School in 1922, he went on to study in Japan the following year. He entered the Department of Western History at Waseda University.

In February 1950, he became Director of the Ministry of National Defense, and served as Minister of Education from April 21, 1954, to June 7, 1956 .

While serving as Minister of Education, he actively intervened in the 1956 presidential and vice-presidential election fraud and was sued by the Democratic Party. Ultimately, on June 5, 1956, the National Assembly passed a no-confidence motion against him and forced him to resign in disgrace.

He served as a professor at Dong-A University in 1956, the president of Sungkyunkwan University in 1957, the president of the Korea Commerce Association (renamed as the Korean Veterans Association) from November 26, 1959, to May 3, 1960, and a professor at the Kyunghee University in 1962, when the Park Chung Hee regime came into power. Afterwards, he actively praised the Yushin Constitution while serving as the president of the Yeungnam University in 1969, the president of the Dongguk University in 1974, the president of the Korean Educational Association in 1976, and the first director of the Institute of Spiritual Culture in 1978.
