= Unified Hangul Orthography =

1933 Korean orthography revised multiple times

Cover of the 1933 original

The Unified Hangul Orthography (UHO; Korean: 한글 맞춤법 통일안; Hanja: 한글 맞춤法 統一案) is a 1933 Hangul orthography for the Korean language published by the Korean Language Society. It is considered a critical document in the history of the Korean language, especially as it is the basis of both the North and South Korean orthographies (the Compendium of Korean Language Norms and Hangeul Orthography respectively).

The orthography was revised and reprinted a number of times. It was revised in 1937, 1940, 1946, 1948, and 1958. In South Korea, the Korean Language Society produced a new orthography based on the UHO: the "Hangeul Orthography". However, that orthography was not made official. The South Korean government later published another orthography (also called Hangeul Orthography) in 1988; that orthography has remained in effect until the present.

After the 1945 division of Korea, the northern Soviet Civil Administration continued using the orthography. Ross King argued the north continued using the 1940 edition until 1954, (Note: While North Korea did propose the New Korean Orthography in 1948, it was never put into effect.) when it adopted the "Korean Orthography", which was heavily based on the UHO. Afterwards, it adopted the Compendium of Korean Language Norms in 1966, which it has used since.

== See also ==
- Hangul orthography § History
