= Word-initial /l/ and /n/ in Korean =

Phenomenon in the Korean language

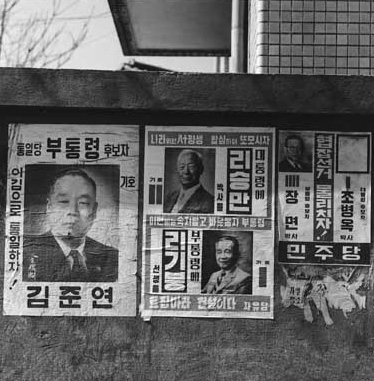
The poster of March 1960 South Korean presidential election. Note that the surname Lee (hanja: 李, written as "이" in South Korea today) of Syngman Rhee and Lee Ki-poong were still printed as "리".

Word-initial /l/ and /n/ sounds in the Korean language (Korean: 두음법칙; Hanja: 頭音法則; RR: dueum beopchik) are a phenomenon in Korean phonology with particular characteristics.

Such sounds are reflected differently between North and South Korean orthographies.

== Background ==
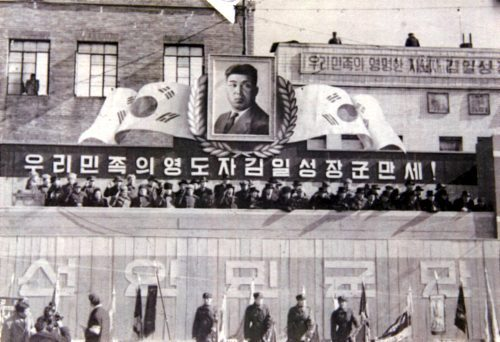
The motto hung at the founding ceremony of the Korean People's Army in 1948 reads, "Long live General Kim Il-sung, the leader of our people!" In this motto, the Sino-Korean term "領導者" (leader) is spelled using the initial sound rule: 영도자 yeongdoja instead of ryeongdoja 령도자.

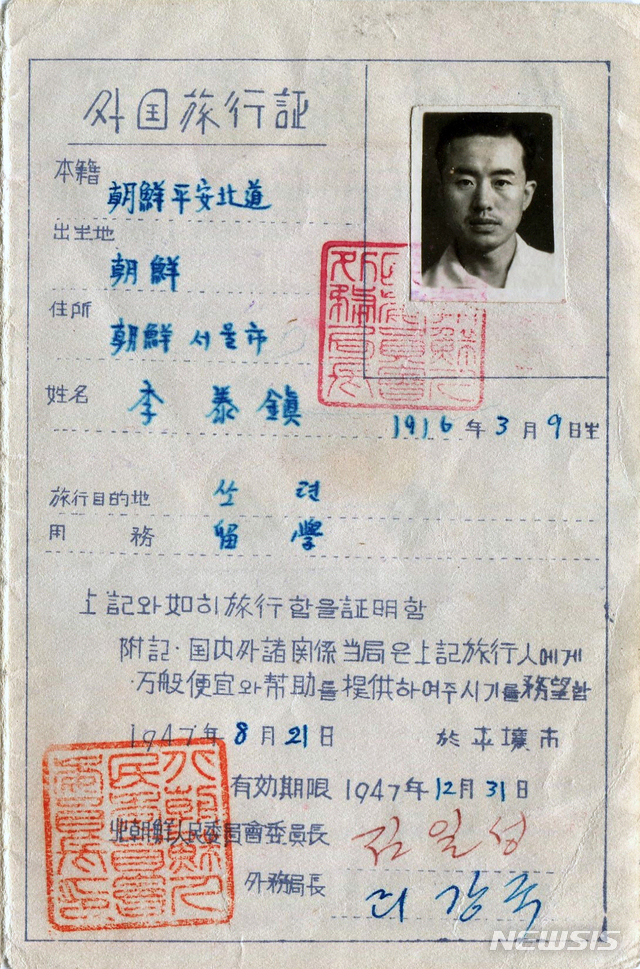
A Certificate for Foreign Travel issued in 1947, Chief of Foreign Affairs Department Ri Kang-guk (리강국) didn't use the initial sound rule for his signature.

In native Korean words, ㄹ r does not occur at the beginning (onset) of syllables, unlike in Chinese loanwords. Literature from as early the 16th century shows that pronunciation of Sino-Korean words was nativized enough that the new sounds began to be reflected. In the 17th century, the original version of Hendrick Hamel's book also records placenames that reflect the rules of pronunciation, such as Naedjoo for Naju (Hanja: 羅州) and Jeham for Yeongam (Hanja: 靈巖). In the late 19th and the early 20th centuries, there were also cases of the surname Lee being also romanized as "Ye," "Yi," etc.

Thus, the claim of Professor Emeritus Ryeo Jeoung-dong (려증동) that the initial sound rule and the final consonant notation were first organized in the Korean orthography for elementary schools in 1912, during the Korean colonial period, is not true. He works for the Department of Korean Literature at Gyeongsang National University and is South Korea's representative proponent for the abolition of the initial sound rule.

In Modern Korean, the South Korean standard language recognizes the initial sound rule except in a few conditions. While the North Korean standard language briefly adhered to the initial sound rule, it soon abandoned it. North Korea no longer follows the rule today except in a few cases and instead uses the earlier spellings for Sino-Korean vocabulary.

== Specific rules made by the National Institute of Korean Language ==
The National Institute of Korean Language made three rules regarding initial sounds:

- When the Chinese consonants "nyeo, nyo, nyu, ni" appear at the beginning of a word, they are written as "yeo, yo, yu, i" according to the initial sound rule.
- When the Chinese consonants "rya, ryeo, rye, ryo, ryu, ri" appear at the beginning of a word, they are written as "ya, yeo, ye, yo, yu, i" according to the initial sound rule.
- When the Chinese consonants "ra, rae, ro, roe, ru, reu" appear at the beginning of a word, they are written as "na, nae, no, noe, nu, neu" according to the initial sound rule.

== See also ==
- North–South differences in the Korean language § Initial sound rule
- Korean phonology § Sonorants
