= New Korean Orthography =

1948 proposed North Korean orthography

- Hangul: 조선어 신철자법
- Hanja: 朝鮮語新綴字法
- RR: Joseoneo sincheoljabeop
- MR: Chosŏnŏ sinch'ŏlchapŏp

The New Korean Orthography (Korean: 조선어 신철자법) was a spelling reform in North Korea that was proposed in 1948 but never officially adopted.

It added five consonants and one vowel letter to the Hangul alphabet in an attempt to fit the morphophonology of the Korean language.

== History ==
Upon the 1945 liberation and division of Korea, the northern portion of Korea, the Soviet Civil Administration, used the same orthography as in the south: the Unified Hangul Orthography. Specifically, North Korea used the 1940 revision of it.

In 1945, the North Korean Provisional People's Committee began a language planning campaign on the Soviet model. Originally, both North Korean and South Korean Hangul script was based on the Unified Plan promulgated in 1933 under the Japanese. The goals of the independent North Korean campaign were to increase literacy, re-standardize Hangul to form a "New Korean" that could be used as a cultural weapon of revolution, and eliminate the use of Hanja (Chinese characters). The study of Russian was also made compulsory from middle school onward, and communist terminology—such as Workers' Party, People's Army, and Fatherland Liberation War—were rapidly assimilated into Korean. The ban on Hanja in 1949 (excepting parenthetical references in scientific and technical publications) was part of a language purification movement which sought to replace Sino-Korean vocabulary and loanwords from Japanese with native neologisms on the grounds that they were "reactionary" and separated the literary intelligentsia from the masses. New dictionaries, monolingual and bilingual Russian-Korean, were to be based on the concept of "self-reliance" (juche); place names and personal names modeled after Chinese naming practices were also purged and replaced with socialist concepts.

In 1948, the New Korean Orthography was proposed, along with the Standard Language Orthography Dictionary, which aimed to provide a unified guideline for the usage of the new script. The Communist Party of Korea claimed that this New Orthography was the first in Korean history to represent the language of the proletariat. The only publications to use the New Korean Orthography were the linguistics journal Korean Language Research and the 1949 Korean Grammar. The language standardization efforts were interrupted by the Korean War and hampered by Kim Il Sung's disapproval of the new orthography.

Ultimately, North Korea adopted the Korean Orthography in 1954 instead, which was significantly closer to the previous orthography in place, and did not include the radical letter reforms of the NKO.

In March 1958, the new orthography's creator, Kim Tu Bong, was purged from the party, and linguistics journals began publishing attacks on him and his system. From then on, proposals for script reform were restricted to the idea of writing Hangul horizontally, rather than in syllable blocks. Linguistic journals also continued to attack "foreignisms" from Chinese and English (e.g., pai pai/bai bai 바이 바이, "bye bye"). In the 1960s, Kim Il Sung issued a directive that would bind all future language planning to Korean ethnic nationalism, saying that "people of the same racial make-up, the same culture, living in the same territory ... [have a] need for a nationalistic, pure standard". Thus, Pyongan dialect was chosen as the standard dialect for North Korean, purely for the reason that it was considered less "contaminated" by foreign cultures and capitalists. The legacy of the New Korean Orthography lies in North Korea's modern use of Hangul, which reflects morphology more than pronunciation as it does in the South.

Its historical significance has been recognized by linguists, and since then it has been proposed to add the six additional letters into the Unicode system in order to preserve it.

== Contents ==
Seven words written in New Orthography. The South Korean standard spellings are 놉니다, 흘렀다, 깨달으니, 지어, 고와, 왕, 가져서, and 암탉.

The reason for the reform is that some Korean roots change form and therefore cannot be written with a consistent spelling using standard Hangul. The additional letters introduced in the New Orthography do not represent new sounds, but these situations where a sound changes, say from a /p/ to a /w/. Three were created de novo by modifying existing letters, two (ㅿ and ㆆ) were obsolete letters, and one is a numeral.

For example, the root of the verb "to walk" has the form 걷 kŏt- before a consonant, as in the inflection 걷다 kŏtta, but the form 걸 kŏl- before a vowel, as in 걸어 kŏrŏ and 걸으니 kŏrŭni. In New Orthography, the root is an invariable 거ᇫ, spelled with the new letter ㅿ in place of both the ㄷ in 걷 and the ㄹ in 걸: 거ᇫ다 kŏtta, 거ᇫ어 kŏrŏ.

Another example is the root of the verb "to heal", which has the form 낫 nas- before a consonant, as in 낫다 natda, but the form 나 before a vowel, as in 나아 na. In some cases, there is an epenthetic ŭ vowel before a consonant suffix, as in 나을 naŭl. In New Orthography, this variable root is written as an invariable 나ᇹ, and the epenthetic vowel is not written: 나ᇹ다 NA’.TA for 낫다 natta, 나ᇹᄅ NA’.L for 나을 naŭl, 나ᇹ아 NA’.A for 나아 naa.

Letter	Pronunciation	
Letter	before a vowel	before a consonant
	/l/	∅
	/ll/	/l/
ㅿ	/l/	/t/
ㆆ	∅	/◌͈/ (Note: Makes the following consonant tense, as a final ㅅ does.)
	/w/ (Note: In standard orthography, combines with a following vowel as ㅘ, ㅙ, ㅚ, ㅝ, ㅞ, ㅟ.)	/p/
	/j/ (Note: In standard orthography, combines with a following vowel as ㅑ, ㅒ, ㅕ, ㅖ, ㅛ, ㅠ.)	/i/

As with all letters in North Korea, the names follow the formula CiŭC. For convenience they are also called 여린리을 (soft riŭl), 된리을 (strong riŭl), 반시읏 (half siŭt), 여린히읗 (soft hiŭt), 위읍 (wiŭp), and 여린이(soft i).

The New Orthography also added two new digraphs to the lexicon, ㅭ /lʔ/ and ᇬ /ŋk/.

There were other changes that made the orthography more morphemic, without requiring the addition of new letters. For example, in the word normally spelled 놉니다 (top example in image at right), the politeness morpheme ㅂ is separated out in its own block. Such spellings can be found in medieval documents, but were not normally seen in the 20th century.

The attributive ㄴ n morpheme at the ends of adjectives is also placed in a separate block, and the occasional epenthetic ŭ that appears before it is not written, unlike standard 은 ŭn. A morphemic h is retained before this ending: 하얗다 HA.YAH.TA hayata "is white", 하얗ㄴ HA.YAH.N hayan "white" (standard 하얀 HA.YAN). 좋다 JOH.TA jota "is good", 좋ㄴ JOH.N johŭn "good" (standard 좋은 JOH.ŬN).

== See also ==
- Revised Romanization
