= Korean phonology =

Sound system of the Korean language

The phonology of the Korean language covers the language's phonemic, or distinct and meaningful, sounds (19 consonants and 7 vowels in the standard Seoul dialect) and the rules governing how those sounds interact with each other. This article is a technical description of the phonetics and phonology of Korean. Unless otherwise noted, statements in this article refer to the South Korean standard language based on the Seoul dialect.

== Consonants ==
Korean has 19 consonant phonemes.

For each plosive and affricate, there is a three-way contrast between unvoiced segments, which are distinguished as plain, tense, and aspirated.

- The "plain" segments, sometimes referred to as "lax" or "lenis", are considered to be the more "basic" or unmarked members of the Korean obstruent series. The "plain" segments are also distinguished from the tense and aspirated phonemes by changes in vowel quality, including a relatively lower pitch of the following vowel.
- The "tense" segments, also referred to as "fortis", "hard", or "glottalized", have eluded precise description and have been the subject of considerable phonetic investigation. In the Korean alphabet as well as all widely used romanization systems for Korean, they are represented as doubled plain segments: ㅃ pp, ㄸ tt, ㅉ jj, ㄲ kk. As it was suggested from the Middle Korean spelling, the tense consonants came from the initial consonant clusters sC-, pC-, and psC-.
- The "aspirated" segments are characterized by aspiration, a burst of air accompanied by the delayed onset of voicing.

Korean syllable structure is maximally CGVC, where G is a glide /j, w, ɰ/. (There is a unique off-glide diphthong in the character 의 that combines the sounds [ɯ] and [i] creating [ɰ]). Any consonant except /ŋ/ may occur initially, but only /p, t, k, m, n, ŋ, l/ may occur finally. Sequences of two consonants may occur between vowels.

Consonant phonemes
| | | Bilabial | Alveolar | (Alveolo-) Palatal | Velar | Glottal |
|---|---|---|---|---|---|---|
| Nasal | | m ㅁ | n ㄴ | | ŋ ㅇ | |
| Stop/ Affricate | plain | p ㅂ | t ㄷ | tɕ ~ ts ㅈ | k ㄱ | |
| Stop/ Affricate | tense | p͈ ㅃ | t͈ ㄸ | t͈ɕ ~ t͈s ㅉ | k͈ ㄲ | |
| Stop/ Affricate | aspirated | pʰ ㅍ | tʰ ㅌ | tɕʰ ~ tsʰ ㅊ | kʰ ㅋ | |
| Fricative | plain/aspirated | | s ㅅ | | | h ㅎ |
| Fricative | tense | | s͈ ㅆ | | | |
| Sonorant | | w | l~ɾ ㄹ | j | ɰ | |

Example words for consonant phonemes
| IPA | Example | | |
| IPA | Korean | Pronunciation | Translation |
|---|---|---|---|
| /p/ | 불 bul | [pul] | 'fire' or 'light' |
| /p͈/ | 뿔 ppul | [p͈ul] | 'horn' |
| /pʰ/ | 풀 pul | [pʰul] | 'grass' or 'glue' |
| /m/ | 물 mul | [m͊ul] | 'water' or 'liquid' |
| /t/ | 달 dal | [tal] | 'moon' or 'month' |
| /t͈/ | 딸 ttal | [t͈al] | 'daughter' |
| /tʰ/ | 탈 tal | [tʰal] | 'mask' or 'trouble' |
| /n/ | 날 nal | [n͊al] | 'day' or 'blade' |
| /tɕ/ | 자다 jada | [tɕada] | 'to sleep' |
| /t͈ɕ/ | 짜다 jjada | [t͈ɕada] | 'to squeeze' or 'to be salty' |
| /tɕʰ/ | 차다 chada | [tɕʰada] | 'to kick' or 'to be cold' |
| /k/ | 기 gi | [ki] | 'energy' |
| /k͈/ | 끼 kki | [k͈i] | 'talent' or 'meal' |
| /kʰ/ | 키 ki | [kʰi] | 'height' |
| /ŋ/ | 방 bang | [paŋ] | 'room' |
| /s/ | 살 sal | [sal] | 'flesh' |
| /s͈/ | 쌀 ssal | [s͈al] | 'uncooked grains of rice' |
| /l/ | 바람 baram | [paɾam] | 'wind' or 'wish' |
| /l/ | 발 bal | [pal] | 'foot' |
| /h/ | 하다 hada | [hada] | 'to do' |

=== Plain ===
/p, t, tɕ, k/ are voiced [b, d, dʑ, ɡ] between sonorants (including all vowels and certain consonants) but voiceless elsewhere. Among younger generations, they may be just as aspirated as /pʰ, tʰ, tɕʰ, kʰ/ in initial position; the primary difference is that vowels following the plain consonants carry low tone.

=== Aspirated ===
/pʰ, tʰ, tɕʰ, kʰ/ are strongly aspirated, more so than English voiceless stops. They generally do not undergo intervocalic voicing, but a 2020 study reports that it still occurs in around 10 to 15% of cases. It is more prevalent among older male speakers who have aspirated stops voiced in as much as 28% of cases.

=== Tense ===
The IPA diacritic ⟨◌͈⟩, resembling a subscript double straight quotation mark, shown here with a placeholder circle, is used to denote the tensed consonants /p͈/, /t͈/, /k͈/, /t͈ɕ/, /s͈/. Its official use in the Extensions to the IPA is for strong articulation, but is used in literature in the context of Korean phonology for faucalized voice. The Korean consonants also have elements of stiff voice, but it is not yet known how typical that is of faucalized consonants. Sometimes the tense consonants are marked with an apostrophe, ⟨ʼ⟩, but that is not IPA usage; in the IPA, the apostrophe indicates ejective consonants. Some works use full-size ʔ or small ˀ before tensed consonants; this notation is generally used to denote pre-glottalization. An asterisk * after a tensed consonant is also used in literature.

They are produced with a partially constricted glottis and additional subglottal pressure in addition to tense vocal tract walls, laryngeal lowering, or other expansion of the larynx.
An alternative analysis proposes that the "tensed" series of sounds are (fundamentally) regular voiceless, unaspirated consonants: the "lax" sounds are voiced consonants that become devoiced initially, and the primary distinguishing feature between word-initial "lax" and "tensed" consonants is that initial lax sounds cause the following vowel to assume a low-to-high pitch contour, a feature reportedly associated with voiced consonants in many Asian languages (such as Shanghainese), whereas tensed (and also aspirated) consonants are associated with a uniformly high pitch.

Vowels before tense consonants (as well as aspirated) tend to be shorter than before lax stops.

The Gyeongsang dialect is known for realization of tense ㅆ ss as plain ㅅ s.

=== Fricatives ===
ㅎ h does not occur in final position, (Note: Orthographically, it is found at the end of the name of the letter ㅎ, 히읗 hieut.) though the sound /h/ does occur at the end of non-final syllables, where it affects the following consonant. (See below.) Intervocalically, it is realized as voiced [ɦ], and after voiced consonants it is either [ɦ] or silent.

The analysis of /s/ as phonologically plain or aspirated has been a source of controversy in the literature. Similarly to plain stops, it shows moderate aspiration word-initially but no aspiration word-medially. It also often undergoes intervocalic voicing. But similar to aspirated stops, it triggers high pitch in the following vowel.

Word-initial aspiration, intervocalic voicing, and higher pitch of the following vowels are shared qualities in Korean fricatives /s/ and /h/.

=== Sonorants ===
Sonorants resemble vowels in the sense that plain stops become voiced between a sonorant or a vowel and another vowel.

ㅁ, ㄴ /m, n/ tend to be denasalized word-initially towards [b, d], and may be perceived as /b, d/ by native English speakers. In this article, these allophones are transcribed [m͊, n͊].

ㅇ ng does not occur in initial position, reflected in the way the Hangul jamo ㅇ has a different pronunciation in the initial position to the final position. These were distinguished when Hangul was created, with the jamo ㆁ with the upper dot and the jamo ㅇ without the upper dot; these were then conflated and merged in both the North Korean and South Korean standards. /ŋ/ can technically occur syllable-initially, as in 명이, which is written as /mjɔŋ.i/, but pronounced as /mjɔ.ŋi/.

ㄹ /l/ is an alveolar flap [ɾ] between vowels or between a vowel and an /h/. It is [l] or [ɭ] at the end of a word, before a consonant other than /h/, or next to another /l/; in these contexts, it is palatalized to [ʎ] before /i, j/ and before palatal consonant allophones. There is free variation at the beginning of a word, where this phoneme tends to become [n] before most vowels and silent before /i, j/, but it is commonly [ɾ] in English loanwords. Geminate /ll/ is realized as [ll]/[ɭɭ], or as [ʎʎ] before /i, j/.

In native Korean words, ㄹ r does not occur word initially, unlike in Chinese loans (Sino-Korean vocabulary). In South Korea, it is silent in initial position before /i/ and /j/, pronounced [n] before other vowels, and pronounced [ɾ] only in compound words after a vowel. The prohibition on word-initial r is called the initial sound rule. Initial r is spelled with ㄹ in North Korea, but is often pronounced the same way as it is in South Korea.

- "labour" (勞動) – North Korea: rodong (로동), South Korea: nodong (노동)
- "history" (歷史) – North Korea: ryŏksa (력사), South Korea: yeoksa (역사)

This rule also extends to ㄴ n in many native and all Sino-Korean words, which is also lost before initial /i/ and /j/ in South Korean; again, North Korean preserves the [n] phoneme there.

- "female" (女子) – North Korea: nyŏja (녀자), South Korea: yeoja (여자)

In both countries, initial r in words of foreign origin other than Chinese is pronounced [ɾ]. Very old speakers may pronounce word-initial r as [n] even in Western loanwords, e.g. in "lighter" 라이터 [naitʰɔː].

When pronounced as an alveolar flap [ɾ], ㄹ is sometimes derived from [d] through a historical lenition process, such as in the verb 듣다 which turns into 들어요.

The features of consonants are summarized in the following table.

Features of consonants
| Consonant class | Voice | Tension | Aspiration | Pitch of following vowel |
|---|---|---|---|---|
| Sonorants ㅁㄴㄹㅇ m n r ∅ | yes | lenis | no | low |
| Plain ㅂㅈㄷㄱ b j d g | intervocalically | lenis | slight heavy (word-initially) | low |
| ㅎ h | intervocalically (if not silent) | lenis | (yes) | high |
| ㅅ s | possible | lenis | slight heavy (word-initially) | high |
| Aspirated ㅍㅊㅌㅋ p ch t k | no | fortis | heavy | high |
| Tense ㅃㅉㄸㄲㅆ pp jj tt kk ss | no | fortis | no | high |

=== Clusters ===
Morphemes may also end in CC clusters, which are both expressed only when they are followed by a vowel. When the morpheme is not suffixed, one of the consonants is not expressed; if there is a /h/, which cannot appear in final position, it will be that. Otherwise it will be a coronal consonant (with the exception of /lb/, sometimes), and if the sequence is two coronals, the voiceless one (/s, tʰ, tɕ/) will drop, and /n/ or /l/ will remain. /lb/ either reduces to [l] (as in 짧다 [t͡ɕ͈alt͈a] "to be short") or to [p̚] (as in 밟다 [paːp̚t͈a] "to step"); 여덟 [jʌdʌl] "eight" is always pronounced 여덜 even when followed by a vowel-initial particle. Thus, no sequence reduces to [t̚] in final position.

| Sequence | ㄳ gs | ㄺ lg | ㄵ nj | ㄶ nh | ㄽ ls | ㄾ lt | ㅀ lh | ㄼ lb | ㅄ bs | ㄿ lp | ㄻ lm |
|---|---|---|---|---|---|---|---|---|---|---|---|
| Medial allophone | [k̚s͈] | [lɡ] | [ndʑ] | [n(ɦ)] | [ls͈] | [ltʰ] | [l(ɦ)] | [lb] | [p̚s͈] | [lpʰ] | [lm] |
| Final allophone | [k̚] | | [n] | | [l] | | | | [p̚] | | [m] |

When such a sequence is followed by a consonant, the same reduction takes place, but a trace of the lost consonant may remain in its effect on the following consonant. The effects are the same as in a sequence between vowels: an elided obstruent will leave the third consonant fortis, if it is a stop, and an elided ⫽h⫽ will leave it aspirated. Most conceivable combinations do not actually occur; (Note: For example, morpheme-final ⫽lp⫽ occurs only in verb roots such as 밟 balb and is followed by only the consonants d, j, g, n.) a few examples are ⫽lh-tɕ⫽ = [ltɕʰ], ⫽nh-t⫽ = [ntʰ], ⫽nh-s⫽ = [ns͈], ⫽ltʰ-t⫽ = [lt͈], ⫽ps-k⫽ = [p̚k͈], ⫽ps-tɕ⫽ = [p̚t͈ɕ]; also ⫽ps-n⫽ = [mn], as /s/ has no effect on a following /n/, and ⫽ks-h⫽ = [kʰ], with the /s/ dropping out.

When the second and third consonants are homorganic obstruents, they merge, becoming fortis or aspirate, and, depending on the word and a preceding ⫽l⫽, might not elide: ⫽lk-k⫽ is [lk͈].

An elided ⫽l⫽ has no effect: ⫽lk-t⫽ = [k̚t͈], ⫽lk-tɕ⫽ = [k̚t͈ɕ], ⫽lk-s⫽ = [k̚s͈], ⫽lk-n⫽ = [ŋn], ⫽lm-t⫽ = [md], ⫽lp-k⫽ = [p̚k͈], ⫽lp-t⫽ = [p̚t͈], ⫽lp-tɕ⫽ = [p̚t͈ɕ], ⫽lpʰ-t⫽ = [p̚t͈], ⫽lpʰ-tɕ⫽ = [p̚t͈ɕ], ⫽lp-n⫽ = [mn].

=== Positional allophones ===
Korean consonants have three principal positional allophones: initial, medial (voiced), and final (checked). The initial form is found at the beginning of phonological words. The medial form is found in voiced environments, intervocalically (immediately between vowels), and after a voiced consonant such as n or l. The final form is found in checked environments such as at the end of a phonological word or before an obstruent consonant such as t or k. Nasal consonants (m, n, ng) do not have noticeable positional allophones beyond initial denasalization, and ng cannot appear in this position.

The table below is out of alphabetical order to make the relationships between the consonants explicit:

| Phoneme | ㄱ g | ㅋ k | ㄲ kk | ㅇ ng | ㄷ d | ㅌ t | ㅅ s | ㅆ ss | ㅈ j | ㅊ ch | ㄸ tt | ㅉ jj | ㄴ n | ㄹ r | ㅂ b | ㅍ p | ㅃ pp | ㅁ m | ㅎ h |
|---|---|---|---|---|---|---|---|---|---|---|---|---|---|---|---|---|---|---|---|
| Initial allophone | k~kʰ | kʰ | k͈ | n/a | t~tʰ | tʰ | s~sʰ | s͈ | tɕ~tɕʰ | tɕʰ | t͈ | t͈ɕ | n~n͊ | ɾ~l~n~n͊ | p~pʰ | pʰ | p͈ | m~m͊ | h |
| Medial allophone | ɡ | kʰ | k͈ | ŋ | d | tʰ | s~sʰ | s͈ | dʑ | tɕʰ | t͈ | t͈ɕ | n | ɾ | b | pʰ | p͈ | m | h~ɦ~n/a |
| Final allophone | k̚ | | | ŋ | t̚ | | | | | | n/a | | n | l | p̚ | | n/a | m | n/a |

All obstruents (stops, affricates, fricatives) become stops with no audible release at the end of a word: all coronals collapse to [t̚], all labials to [p̚], and all velars to [k̚]. (Note: The only fortis consonants to occur finally are ㄲ kk and ㅆ ss.) Final ㄹ r is a lateral [l] or [ɭ].

==== Palatalization ====
The vowel that most affects consonants is /i/, which, along with its semivowel homologue /j/, palatalizes /s/ and /s͈/ to alveolo-palatal [ɕ] and [ɕ͈] for most speakers (see North–South differences in the Korean language).

ㅈ, ㅊ, ㅉ are pronounced [tɕ~dʑ, tɕʰ, t͈ɕ] in Seoul, but typically pronounced [ts~dz, tsʰ, t͈s] in Pyongyang. Similarly, /s, s͈/ are palatalized as [ɕ, ɕ͈] before /i, j/ in Seoul. In Pyongyang they remain unchanged. This pronunciation may be also found in Seoul Korean among some speakers, especially before back vowels.

As noted above, initial ⫽l⫽ is silent in this palatalizing environment, at least in South Korea. Similarly, an underlying ⫽t⫽ or ⫽tʰ⫽ at the end of a morpheme becomes a phonemically palatalized affricate /dʑ/ or /tɕʰ/, respectively, when followed by a word or suffix beginning with /i/ or /j/ (it becomes indistinguishable from an underlying ⫽tɕʰ⫽), but that does not happen within native Korean words such as /ʌti/ [ʌdi] "where?".

/kʰ/ is more affected by vowels, often becoming an affricate when followed by /i/ or /ɯ/: [cçi], [kxɯ]. The most variable consonant is /h/, which becomes a palatal [ç] before /i/ or /j/, a velar [x] before /ɯ/, and a bilabial [ɸʷ] before /o/, /u/ and /w/.

Allophones of consonants before vowels
| | /i, j/ | /ɯ/ | /o, u, w/ | /a, ʌ, ɛ, e/ |
|---|---|---|---|---|
| ㅅ /s/ | [ɕ] | [s] | | |
| ㅆ /s͈/ | [ɕ͈] | [s͈] | | |
| ㄷ /t/ + suffix | [dʑ]- | [d]- | | |
| ㅌ /tʰ/ + suffix | [tɕʰ]- | [tʰ]- | | |
| ㅋ /kʰ/ | [cç] | [kx] | [kʰ] | |
| ㅎ /h/ word-initially | [ç] | [x] | [ɸʷ] | [h] |
| ㅎ /h/ intervocalically | [ʝ] | [ɣ] | [βʷ] | [ɦ] |
| ᄅ /l/ | [∅] | [l] | | |
| ᄅ /l/ geminated | [ʎː] | [lː] | | |

In many morphological processes, a vowel /i/ before another vowel may become the semivowel /j/. Likewise, /u/ and /o/, before another vowel, may reduce to /w/. In some dialects and speech registers, the semivowel /w/ assimilates into a following /e/ or /i/ and produces the front rounded vowels [ø] and [y].

==== Consonant assimilation ====
As noted above, tenuis stops and /h/ are voiced after the voiced consonants /m, n, ŋ, l/, and the resulting voiced [ɦ] tends to be elided. Tenuis stops become fortis after obstruents (which, as noted above, are reduced to [k̚, t̚, p̚]); that is, /kt/ is pronounced [k̚t͈]. On the other hand, fortis and nasal stops are unaffected by either environment, though /n/ assimilates to /l/ after an /l/. After /h/, tenuis stops become aspirated, /s/ becomes fortis, and /n/ is unaffected. (Note: Other consonants do not occur after /h/, which is uncommon in morpheme-final position.) Additionally, /l/ undergoes significant changes: it becomes [n] after all consonants except /n/ (which assimilates to /l/) or another /l/. For example, the word ⫽tɕoŋlo⫽ (종로) is pronounced /tɕoŋno/ (종노).

Korean also features regressive (anticipatory) assimilation, where a consonant tends to assimilate in manner but not in place of articulation. For example, obstruents become nasal stops before nasal stops (which, as just noted, includes underlying ⫽l⫽), but do not change their position in the mouth. Velar stops (that is, all consonants pronounced [k̚] in final position) become [ŋ]; coronals ([t̚]) become [n], and labials ([p̚]) become [m]. For example, ⫽hankukmal⫽ (한국말) is pronounced /hankuŋmal/ (한궁말) (phonetically [hanɡuŋmal]).

Before the fricatives /s, s͈/, coronal obstruents assimilate to a fricative, resulting in a geminate. That is, ⫽tʰs⫽ is pronounced /ss͈/ ([s͈ː]). A final /h/ assimilates in both place and manner, so that ⫽hC⫽ is pronounced as a geminate (and, as noted above, aspirated if C is a stop). The two coronal sonorants, /n/ and /l/, in whichever order, assimilate to /l/, so that both ⫽nl⫽ and ⫽ln⫽ are pronounced [lː].

There are lexical exceptions to these generalizations. For example, voiced consonants occasionally cause a following consonant to become fortis rather than voiced; this is especially common with ⫽ls⫽ and ⫽ltɕ⫽ as [ls͈] and [lt͈ɕ], but is also occasionally seen with other sequences, such as ⫽kjʌ.ulpaŋhak⫽ ([kjʌulp͈aŋak̚]), ⫽tɕʰamtoŋan⫽ ([tɕʰamt͈oŋan]) and ⫽wejaŋkanɯlo⫽ ([wejaŋk͈anɯɾo]).

Incorrect application of these phonological rules, such as improper nasalization or assimilation, can significantly impair intelligibility for native speakers. For instance, failing to apply nasalization rules correctly or not recognizing assimilation patterns can lead to pronunciations that are difficult for native speakers to understand.

Phonetic realization (before /a/) of underlying consonant sequences in Korean
| 2nd C 1st C | coda | ㄱ g- | ㄲ kk- | ㄷ d- | ㄸ tt- | ㄴ n- | ㄹ r- | ㅁ m- | ㅂ b- | ㅃ pp- | ㅅ s- | ㅆ ss- | ㅈ j- | ㅉ jj- | ㅊ ch- | ㅋ k- | ㅌ t- | ㅍ p- | ㅎ h- |
|---|---|---|---|---|---|---|---|---|---|---|---|---|---|---|---|---|---|---|---|
| ㅎ -h | n/a | k̚.kʰ | n/a | t̚.tʰ | n/a | n.n | n/a | | p̚.pʰ | n/a | s.s͈ | n/a | t̚.tɕʰ | n/a | | | | | |
| velar stops^{1} -k | k̚ | k̚.k͈ | | k̚.t͈ | | ŋ.n | | ŋ.m | k̚.p͈ | | k.s͈ | | k̚.t͈ɕ | | k̚.tɕʰ | k̚.kʰ | k̚.tʰ | k̚.pʰ | .kʰ |
| ㅇ -ng | ŋ | ŋ.ɡ | ŋ.k͈ | ŋ.d | ŋ.t͈ | ŋ.n | | ŋ.m | ŋ.b | ŋ.p͈ | ŋ.sː | ŋ.s͈ | ŋ.dʑ | ŋ.t͈ɕ | ŋ.tɕʰ | ŋ.kʰ | ŋ.tʰ | ŋ.pʰ | ŋ.ɦ ~ .ŋ |
| coronal stops^{2} -t | t̚ | t̚.k͈ | | t̚.t͈ | | n.n | | n.m | t̚.p͈ | | s.s͈ | | t̚.t͈ɕ | | t̚.tɕʰ | t̚.kʰ | t̚.tʰ | t̚.pʰ | .tʰ |
| ㄴ -n | n | n.ɡ | n.k͈ | n.d | n.t͈ | n.n | l.l | n.m | n.b | n.p͈ | n.sː | n.s͈ | n.dʑ | n.t͈ɕ | n.tɕʰ | n.kʰ | n.tʰ | n.pʰ | n.ɦ ~ .n |
| ㄹ -l | l | l.ɡ | l.k͈ | l.d | l.t͈ | l.l | | l.m | l.b | l.p͈ | l.sː | l.s͈ | l.dʑ | l.t͈ɕ | l.tɕʰ | l.kʰ | l.tʰ | l.pʰ | l.ɦ ~ .ɾ |
| labial stops^{3} -p | p̚ | p̚.k͈ | | p̚.t͈ | | m.n | | m.m | p̚.p͈ | | p.s͈ | | p̚.t͈ɕ | | p̚.tɕʰ | p̚.kʰ | p̚.tʰ | p̚.pʰ | .pʰ |
| ㅁ -m | m | m.ɡ | m.k͈ | m.d | m.t͈ | m.n | | m.m | m.b | m.p͈ | m.sː | m.s͈ | m.dʑ | m.t͈ɕ | m.tɕʰ | m.kʰ | m.tʰ | m.pʰ | m.ɦ ~ .m |

1. Velar obstruents found in final position: ㄱ g, ㄲ kk, ㅋ k
2. Final coronal obstruents: ㄷ d, ㅌ t, ㅅ s, ㅆ ss, ㅈ j, ㅊ ch
3. Final labial obstruents: ㅂ b, ㅍ p

The resulting geminate obstruents, such as [k̚k͈], [ss͈], [p̚pʰ], and [t̚tɕʰ] (that is, [k͈ː], [s͈ː], [pʰː], and [tːɕʰ]), tend to reduce ([k͈], [s͈], [pʰ], [tɕʰ]) in rapid conversation. Heterorganic obstruent sequences such as [k̚p͈] and [t̚kʰ] may, less frequently, assimilate to geminates ([p͈ː], [kːʰ]) and also reduce to ([p͈], [kʰ]).

These sequences assimilate with following vowels the way single consonants do, so that for example ⫽ts⫽ and ⫽hs⫽ palatalize to [ɕɕ͈] (that is, [ɕ͈ː]) before /i/ and /j/; ⫽hk⫽ and ⫽lkʰ⫽ affricate to [kx] and [lkx] before /ɯ/; ⫽ht⫽, ⫽s͈h⫽, and ⫽th⫽ palatalize to [t̚tɕʰ] and [tɕʰ] across morpheme boundaries, and so on.

Hangul orthography does not generally reflect these assimilatory processes, but rather maintains the underlying morphology in most cases.

== Vowels ==
The vowel phonemes of Korean on a vowel chart, from (Lee, 1999). The bottom chart represents long vowels.

Most Standard Korean speakers have seven vowel phonemes.

Seoul Korean monophthongs
| | Front | Central | Back | |
| | unrounded | | | rounded |
|---|---|---|---|---|
| Close | ㅣ [i] | | ㅡ [ɨ]/[ɯ] | ㅜ [u] |
| Close | | | | ㅗ [o] |
| Mid | ㅔ ㅐ [e̞] | | ㅓ [ʌ̹] | |
| Open | | ㅏ [ɐ] | | |

Pyongyang Korean monophthongs
| | Front | Central | Back | |
| | unrounded | | | rounded |
|---|---|---|---|---|
| Close | ㅣ [i] | | ㅡ [ɨ]/[ɯ] | ㅜ [u] |
| Mid | ㅔ [e̞] (ㅐ [ɛ]) | | ㅓ [ʌ] | ㅗ [ɔ] |
| Open | | ㅏ [ɐ] | | |

Korean /a/ is phonetically [ɐ].

The distinction between /e/ and /ɛ/ is lost in South Korean dialects—both are most commonly realized as [e̞], but some older speakers still retain the difference; as for North Korean, some works report the distinction to be robust. However, the data from one study suggests that while younger KCTV anchors try to produce them more or less distinctly, it is not clear whether that is learned or natural pronunciation, as they do so inconsistently. Notably, older anchor Ri Chun-hee and even Kim Jong-un both have /e/ and /ɛ/ merged.

In Seoul Korean, /o/ is produced higher than /ʌ/, while in North Korean dialects the two are comparable in height, and /ʌ/ is more fronted. In Gyeongsang dialect, /ɯ/ and /ʌ/ once have merged into [ə] in speech of older speakers, but they are distinct among young and middle-aged Daegu residents (they actually have the same vowels as Seoulites due to influence from Standard Korean).

In Seoul, /u/ is fronted, while /o/ is raised, and both are almost the same height, though /o/ is still more rounded. Due to this, alternative transcriptions like [u̹] or [u̠] for /o/, and [u̜] or [u̟] for /u/ are proposed. In both varieties, /ɯ/ is fronted away from /u/, and in North Korean it is also lower, shifting more towards [ɘ].

Korean used to have two additional phonemes, [ø] ㅚ and [y] ㅟ, but they are replaced by the diphthongs [we] and [ɥi] by the majority of speakers.

Middle Korean had an additional vowel phoneme denoted by ᆞ, known as arae-a (literally "lower a"). The vowel merged with /a/ in all mainland varieties of Korean, but remains distinct in Jeju where it is pronounced [ɒ].

=== Diphthongs and glides ===
Because they may follow consonants in initial position in a word—which no other consonant can do—and also because of Hangul orthography, which transcribes them as vowels, semivowels such as /j/ and /w/ are sometimes considered to be elements of rising diphthongs rather than separate consonant phonemes.

Diphthongs, disregarding length
| IPA | Hangul | Example | | |
|---|---|---|---|---|
| /je/ | ㅖ | 예산 yesan | [je̞ː.sɐn] | 'budget' |
| /jɛ/ | ㅒ | 얘기 yaegi | [jɛ̝ː.ɡi] | 'story' |
| /ja/ [jɐ] | ㅑ | 야구 yagu | [jɐː.ɡu] | 'baseball' |
| /jo/ | ㅛ | 교사 gyosa | [kʲoː.sa] | 'teacher' |
| /ju/ | ㅠ | 유리 yuri | [ju.ɾi] | 'glass' |
| /jʌ/ | ㅕ | 여기 yeogi | [jʌ.ɡi] | 'here' |
| /wi ~ y/ [ɥi] | ㅟ | 뒤 dwi | [twi] | 'back' |
| /we/ | ㅞ | 궤 gwe | [kwe̞] | 'chest' or 'box' |
| /wɛ/ | ㅙ | 왜 wae | [wɛ̝] | 'why' |
| /wa/ [wɐ] | ㅘ | 과일 gwail | [kwɐː.il] | 'fruit' |
| /wʌ/ | ㅝ | 뭐 mwo | [mwəː] | 'what' |
| /ɰi/ [ɰi ~ i] | ㅢ | 의사 uisa | [ɰi.sɐ] | 'doctor' |

In modern pronunciation, /ɰi/ merges into /i/ after a consonant. Some analyses treat /ɯ/ as a central vowel and thus the marginal sequence /ɰi/ as having a central-vowel onset, which would be more accurately transcribed [ȷ̈i] or [ɨ̯i].

Modern Korean has no falling diphthongs, with sequences like /a.i/ being considered as two separate vowels in hiatus. Middle Korean had a full set of diphthongs ending in /j/, but these monophthongized into modern-day front vowels in Early Modern Korean (/aj/ > /ɛ/, /əj/ [ej] > /e/, /oj/ > /ø/, /uj/ > /y/, /ɯj/ > /ɰi ~ i/). This is the reason why the hangul letters ㅐ, ㅔ, ㅚ etc. are represented as back vowels plus i.

The sequences /*jø, *jy, *jɯ, *ji; *wø, *wy, *wo, *wɯ, *wu/ do not occur, and it is not possible to write them using standard hangul. (Note: While 워 is romanized as wo, it does not represent [wo], but rather [wʌ].) The semivowel [ɰ] occurs only in the diphthong /ɰi/, and is prone to being deleted after a consonant.

=== Loss of vowel length contrast ===
Korean used to have a length distinction for each vowel, but this is now reported to be almost completely neutralized (though it is still prescriptive). Long vowels were pronounced somewhat more peripherally than short ones. As an exception, for most of the speakers who still utilize vowel length contrastively, long /ʌː/ is actually [ɘː].

Vowel length is a remnant of rising tone, first emerging in Middle Korean. It was preserved only in initial syllables and was often neutralized, particularly in the following cases:

- In compound words:
  - 사람 [sʰa̠ːɾa̠m] "man", but
  - 눈사람 [nuːns͈a̠ɾa̠m] "snowman";
  - 벌리다 [pɘːʎʎida̠] "to open, to spread", but
  - 떠벌리다 [t͈ʌ̹bʌ̹ʎʎida̠] "to brag".
- In most monosyllabic verbs when attaching a suffix starting with a vowel
  - 굶다 [kuːmt͈a̠] "to starve", but
  - 굶어 [kulmʌ̹];
  - 넣다 [nɘːtʰa̠] "to put", but
  - 넣으니 [nʌ̹ɯni]/[nʌ̹ɨni],
- or a suffix changing transitivity
  - 붇다 [puːt̚t͈a̠] "to swell up", but
  - 불리다 [puʎʎida̠] "to soak";
  - 꼬다 [k͈o̞ːda̠] "to twist", but
  - 꼬이다 [k͈o̞ida̠] "to be entangled".
- There were exceptions though:
  - 얻다 [ɘːt̚t͈a̠] "to obtain" still had long vowels in
  - 얻어 [ɘːdʌ̹];
  - 없다 [ɘːp̚t͈a̠] "to not be" still had long vowels in
  - 없으니 [ɘːp̚s͈ɯni]/[ɘːp̚s͈ɨni].

It has disappeared gradually among younger speakers, but some middle-aged speakers are still aware of it and can still produce it in conscious speech. The long–short merger has had two main aspects. The first is phonetic: The duration of long vowels in relation to short ones has reduced by a lot (from 2.5:1 in the 1960s to 1.5:1 in the 2000s). Some studies suggest that the length of all vowels is dependent on one's age (older speakers seem to exhibit a slower speech rate, and even their short vowels are produced relatively longer than those of younger speakers). The second aspect is lexical: The subset of words produced with long vowels has gotten smaller. Long vowels tend to be reduced most frequently in high-frequency words.

Vowel phonemes with length distinction
| IPA | Hangul | Example | | |
|---|---|---|---|---|
| /i/ | ㅣ | 시장 sijang | [ɕi.dʑɐŋ] | 'hunger' |
| /iː/ | ㅣ | 시장 sijang | [ɕiː.dʑɐŋ] | 'market' |
| /e/ (Note: Heavy-bordered boxes indicate vowels which are now pronounced the same for most speakers.) | ㅔ | 베개 begae | [pe̞.ɡɛ̝] | 'pillow' |
| /eː/ | ㅔ | 베다 beda | [peː.dɐ] | 'to cut' |
| /ɛ/ | ㅐ | 배 bae | [pɛ̝] | 'pear' |
| /ɛː/ | ㅐ | 배 bae | [pɛː] | 'double' |
| /a/ | ㅏ | 말 mal | [mɐl] | 'horse' |
| /aː/ | ㅏ | 말 mal | [mɐːl] | 'word, language' |
| /o/ | ㅗ | 보리 bori | [po̞.ɾi] | 'barley' |
| /oː/ | ㅗ | 보수 bosu | [poː.su̞] | 'salary' |
| /u/ | ㅜ | 눈 nun | [nun] | 'eye' |
| /uː/ | ㅜ | 눈 nun | [nuːn] | 'snow' |
| /ʌ/ | ㅓ | 벌 beol | [pʌl] | 'punishment' |
| /ʌː/ | ㅓ | 벌 beol | [pɘːl] | 'bee' |
| /ɯ/ | ㅡ | 어른 eoreun | [ɘː.ɾɯn]/[ɘː.ɾɨn] | 'seniors' |
| /ɯː/ (/ɨː/) | ㅡ | 음식 eumsik | [ɯːm.ɕik̚]/[ɨːm.ɕik̚] | 'food' |
| /ø/ [we] (Note: Shaded cells indicate vowels that can be pronounced either as monophthongs or glide-vowel sequences.) | ㅚ | 교회 gyohoe | [ˈkʲoːɦø̞] ~ [kʲoː.βʷe̞] | 'church' |
| /øː/ [weː] | ㅚ | 외투 oetu | [ø̞ː.tʰu] ~ [we̞ː.tʰu] | 'overcoat' |
| /y/ [ɥi] | ㅟ | 쥐 jwi | [t͡ɕy] ~ [t͡ɕʷi] | 'mouse' |
| /yː/ [ɥiː] | ㅟ | 귀신 gwisin | [ˈkyːɕin] ~ [ˈkʷiːɕin] | 'ghost' |

=== Vowel harmony ===
Korean vowel harmony
| Positive, "light", or "yang" vowels | ㅏ a | ㅑ ya | ㅘ wa | ㅗ o | ㅛ yo | (ㆍ ə) |
| Positive, "light", or "yang" vowels | ㅐ ae | ㅒ yae | ㅙ wae | ㅚ oe | (ㆉ yoe) | (ㆎ əi) |
| Neutral or center vowels | ㅣ i | | | | | |
| Negative, "heavy", or "yin" vowels | ㅓ eo | ㅕ yeo | ㅝ wo | ㅜ u | ㅠ yu | ㅡ eu |
| Negative, "heavy", or "yin" vowels | ㅔ e | ㅖ ye | ㅞ we | ㅟ wi | (ㆌ ywi) | ㅢ ui |
Obsolete and dialectal sounds in parentheses.

Traditionally, the Korean language has had strong vowel harmony; that is, in pre-modern Korean, not only did the inflectional and derivational affixes (such as postpositions) change in accordance to the main root vowel, but native words also adhered to vowel harmony. It is not universally prevalent in modern usage, but it remains in onomatopoeia, adjectives and adverbs, interjections, and conjugation. There are also other traces of vowel harmony in Korean.

There are three classes of vowels in Korean: "positive", "negative", and "neutral". The vowel ㅡ (eu) is considered both partially neutral and partially negative. The vowel classes loosely follow the negative and positive vowels; they also follow orthography. Exchanging positive vowels with negative vowels usually creates different nuances of meaning, with positive vowels having diminutive associations and negative vowels having augmentative associations:

- Onomatopoeia:
  - 퐁당퐁당 (pongdang-pongdang) and 풍덩풍덩 (pungdeong-pungdeong), light and heavy water splashing
- Emphasized adjectives:
  - 노랗다 (norata) means plain yellow, while its negative, 누렇다 (nureota), means dark yellow
  - 파랗다 (parata) means plain blue, while its negative, 퍼렇다 (peoreota), means deep blue
- Particles at the end of verbs:
  - 잡다 (japda) (to catch) → 잡았다 (jabatda) (caught)
  - 접다 (jeopda) (to fold) → 접었다 (jeobeotda) (folded)
- Interjections:
  - 아이고 (aigo) and 어이구 (eoigu) expressing surprise, discomfort or sympathy
  - 아하 (aha) and 어허 (eoheo) expressing sudden realization and mild objection, respectively

== Accent and pitch ==
In modern Standard Korean, in multisyllabic words the second syllable has high pitch that gradually comes down in subsequent syllables. The first syllable may have pitch as high as the second if it starts with a tense ㅃ, ㅉ, ㄸ, ㄲ, ㅆ /p͈, t͈ɕ, t͈, k͈, s͈/ or an aspirated ㅍ, ㅊ, ㅌ, ㅋ /pʰ, tɕʰ, tʰ, kʰ/ consonant, as well as ㅅ, ㅎ /sʰ, h/, or lower rising pitch if it starts with plain ㅂ, ㅈ, ㄷ, ㄱ /p, tɕ, t, k/ or a sonorant ㅁ, ㄴ, ㄹ /m, n, r/, including silent ㅇ, i.e. a vowel.

As early as 2004, researchers have posited that pitch and voicing are the actual distinguishing features between modern Korean consonants rather than the standard but seemingly ill-defined "tense" vs "lax" theory. A 2013 study by Kang Yoon-jung and Han Sung-woo which compared voice recordings of Seoul speech from speakers born between 1935 and 2005, and found that, especially among young women, lenis consonants (ㅂㅈㄷㄱ), aspirated consonants (ㅍㅊㅌㅋ) and fortis consonants (ㅃㅉㄸㄲ) had shifted from a distinction of voice onset time to that of pitch, with aspirated consonants losing their aspiration and the higher pitch associated with aspirated consonants among older speakers becoming stronger, and suggests that the modern Seoul dialect is currently undergoing tonogenesis. Kim Mi-Ryoung (2013) notes that these sound shifts still show variations among different speakers, suggesting that the transition is still ongoing. Cho Sung-hye (2017) examined 141 Seoul dialect speakers, and concluded that these pitch changes were originally initiated by females born in the 1950s, and has almost reached completion in the speech of those born in the 1990s. However, Choi Ji-youn et al. (2020) found that the replacement of aspiration with high tone occurs only in the first syllable of a prosodic unit, with later syllables maintaining aspiration.

=== Dialectal pitch accents ===
Several dialects outside Seoul retain the Middle Korean pitch accent system. In the dialect of Northern Gyeongsang, in southeastern South Korea, any syllable may have pitch accent in the form of a high tone, as may the two initial syllables. In bisyllabic words, there are thus three tone patterns:

- 가지 gáji [ká.dʑi] 'kind, sort'
- 가지 gají [ka.dʑí] 'eggplant'
- 가지 gájí [ká.dʑí] 'branch'

In trisyllabic words, there are four possible tone patterns:

- 메누리 ménuri [mé.nu.ɾi] 'daughter-in-law'
- 어무이 eomú-i [ʌ.mú.i] 'mother'
- 원어민 woneomín [wʌ.nʌ.mín] 'native speaker'
- 오래비 órébi [ó.ɾé.bi] 'elder brother'

== Age differences ==
The following changes have been observed since the mid-20th century and by now are widespread, at least in South Korea.

- Contrastive vowel length has disappeared. Although still prescriptive, in 2012, the vowel length was reported to have been almost completely neutralized in Korean, except for a very few older speakers of the Seoul dialect, for whom the vowel length distinction was maintained only in the first syllable of a word. Even amongst those middle-aged speakers who retain the distinction, the phonetic contrast between a long vowel and a short vowel has shrunk to 1.5:1, compared to 2.5:1 recorded in the 1960s; additionally, the number of lexical items featuring long vowels has also reduced, with low-frequency words being more likely to retain long vowels than high-frequency ones. Vowel length has subsequently become a prosodic feature of the language, used mainly for emphasis, and placed typically on the first syllable of the word.
- The mid front rounded vowel ([ø] ㅚ) and the close front rounded vowel ([y] ㅟ), can still be heard in the speech of some older speakers, but they have been largely replaced by the diphthongs [we] and [ɥi], respectively. In a 2003 survey of 350 speakers from Seoul, nearly 90% pronounced the vowel ㅟ as [ɥi].
- The distinction between /e/ and /ɛ/ is lost in South Korean dialects. A number of homophones have appeared due to this change, and speakers may employ different strategies to distinguish them. For example, 내가 /nɛ-ɡa/ "I-subject" and 네가 /ne-ɡa/ "you-subject" are now pronounced as [ne̞ɡɐ] and [niɡɐ] respectively, with the latter having changed its vowel; 새 잔 /sɛ tɕan/ "new glass" is pronounced with tensified [s͈] by some young speakers to not be conflated with 세 잔 /se tɕan/ "three glasses".

Some changes are still ongoing. They depend on age and gender, the speech of young females tends to be most innovative, while old males are phonologically conservative.

- Plain stops in word-initial position are becoming as aspirated as "true" aspirated stops. They are still distinguished by their pitch, which indicates ongoing tonogenesis in Contemporary Seoul Korean. This is however contested by studies which explain this as a prosodic feature.
- Some words experience tensification of initial plain consonants, in both native and Sino-Korean words. It is proscribed in normative Standard Korean, but may be widespread or occur in free variation in certain words. Examples:
  - 가시 /kasi/ "1) thorn; 2) worm" is pronounced 까시 /k͈asi/
  - 닦다 /tak̚t͈a/ "to polish" is pronounced 딲다 /t͈ak̚t͈a/
  - 조금 /tɕoɡɯm/ "a little" is pronounced 쪼금 /t͈ɕoɡɯm/, 쬐끔 /t͈ɕʷek͈ɯm/
- Tensification is very common in Western loanwords: 배지 [p͈e̞t͈ɕi] "badge", 버스 [p͈ʌ̹s͈ɯ] "bus", 잼 [t͈ɕe̞m] "jam", although also proscribed in South Korea.
