= Samuel E. Martin =

American linguist (1924–2009)

- Martin in 1994, when he received the South Korean Order of Cultural Merit
- Born: 29 January 1924; Pittsburg, Kansas, US
- Died: 28 November 2009 (aged 85); Vancouver, Washington, US
- Known for: Study of Japanese and Korean languages
- Awards: Order of Cultural Merit (1994, rank unknown)

Academic background
- Education: Yale University, University of California, Berkeley
- Doctoral advisor: Bernard Bloch

Academic work
- Institutions: Yale University
- Notable students: J. Marshall Unger, S. Robert Ramsey, Ross King

Samuel Elmo Martin (29 January 1924 – 28 November 2009) was an American linguist known for seminal work on the languages of East Asia, a professor at Yale University, and the author of many works on the Korean and Japanese languages.

== Biography ==
Martin was born in Pittsburg, Kansas on 29 January 1924, and grew up in Emporia, Kansas. During World War II he was trained as a Japanese Language Officer, and was stationed in Japan at the end of the war.

After the war, he enrolled at the University of California, Berkeley, where he majored in Oriental Languages. He graduated in 1947, but stayed on at Berkeley to study for a master's degree in linguistics under Chao Yuen Ren, which he completed in 1949. He then went to Yale University to study for a PhD in Japanese Linguistics under Bernard Bloch. He completed his dissertation on Japanese morphophonemics in 1950 (published as a monograph by the Linguistic Society of America the following year), and was immediately offered a position at Yale University, where he remained until his retirement in 1994. He was made professor of Far Eastern Linguistics in 1962, and chaired both the Department of East and South Asian Languages and the Department of Linguistics. He also served as director of undergraduate studies in linguistics and director of graduate studies in East Asian languages and literatures. He was an executive fellow of Timothy Dwight College.

After Martin retired from Yale University, he moved to near Vancouver, Washington, near where his wife Nancy Rendell Martin had grown up, and close to Portland, Oregon, where his daughter Norah Martin teaches philosophy. During his retirement, Martin continued research on a variety of linguistic topics, notably Middle Korean.

In 1994, Martin was awarded the South Korean Order of Cultural Merit.

== Scholarly contributions ==
In the 1950s Martin worked on issues relating to Japanese and Korean orthography and romanizations. At this time he coined the term "Sino-Xenic" in creating a common nomenclature for Sino-Vietnamese vocabulary, Sino-Korean vocabulary and Sino-Japanese vocabulary. He published a monograph on Japanese orthography in 1952, and in 1954 he was invited by Syngman Rhee, President of South Korea, to give his ideas on the orthographic reform of the Korean script, which were published in 1954 in various Korean newspapers. In 1954 he devised the Yale romanization system for transliterating Korean, which is extensively used by linguists. During this period he also made important contributions on Chinese, producing a monograph on the phonemes of Ancient Chinese in 1953, and an important article on Mandarin phonology in 1957.

During the 1960s Martin extended his linguistic talents to studies of the Dagur language (1961), and the Shodon dialect of Ryukyuan (1970). His most famous work from this period was a 1966 article, "Lexical evidence relating Korean to Japanese", that was based on a systematic application of the comparative method, and which advanced the hypothesis that Korean and Japanese are genetically related. He also published articles on subjects that had been very little studied until that time, such as sound symbolism in Korean (1962) and speech styles in Japan and Korea (1964).

His monumental work, Reference Grammar of Japanese, was published in 1975, and together with his Japanese Language through Time (1987) are landmarks in the study of the grammar and history of the Japanese language.

During the 1980s Martin concentrated his research activities on Middle Korean, making detailed analysis of numerous 15th and 16th century Korean texts, which he used as the basis for a database of Middle Korean linguistic structures and examples. This work formed the backbone of his monumental Reference Grammar of Korean (1993) which provides a detailed description of both 20th-century Korean and Middle Korean morphemes, making it a valuable tool for those researching the history and structure of the Korean language.

In addition to his scholarly linguistic works, Martin was interested in the teaching of East Asian languages, and he wrote a number of elementary texts and dictionaries for beginners. According to a Merriam-Webster blog called Words We're Watching, Martin is "widely credited" with coining the term "nibling" as a gender-neutral term for a nephew or niece, by analogy with the word "sibling" (though Merriam-Webster's lexicographers had been unable to verify this directly).

== Works ==
=== Books ===
- ——— (1951). Korean in a Hurry: A Quick Approach to Spoken Korean. Tuttle Publishing, Japan. ISBN 0-8048-0349-8. (First US edition: 1954.)
- ——— (1975). A Reference Grammar of Japanese. New Haven: Yale University Press. ISBN 0-300-01813-4.
- ———; Lee, Yang Ha; Chang, Sung-Un (1975). A Korean-English Dictionary. New Haven: Yale University Press.
- ——— (1987). The Japanese Language through Time. New Haven: Yale University Press. ISBN 0-300-03729-5.
- ——— (1992). Essential Japanese: An Introduction to the Standard Colloquial Language (3rd revised ed.). Tuttle Publishing. ISBN 0-8048-1862-2.
- ——— (1993). A Reference Grammar of Korean: A Complete Guide to the Grammar and History of the Korean Language. Rutland, Vermont: Charles E. Tuttle. ISBN 0-8048-1887-8. (2006 reprint: ISBN 0-8048-3771-6.)
- ——— (1996). Consonant Lenition in Korean and the Macro-Altaic Question. Honolulu: University of Hawaii Press. ISBN 0-8248-1809-1.

=== Articles and chapters ===
- ——— (1966). "Lexical evidence relating Korean to Japanese". Language. 12 (2): 185–251. doi:10.2307/411687. JSTOR 411687.
- ——— (1975). "Problems in establishing the prehistoric relationships of Korean and Japanese". Proceedings International Symposium Commemorating the 30th Anniversary of Korean Liberation. Seoul: National Academy of Sciences.
- ——— (1982). "On the consonant distinctions of earlier Korean". Hangul. 175: 59–172.
- ——— (1990). "Morphological clues to the relationships of Japanese and Korean". In Baldi, Philip (ed.). Linguistic Change and Reconstruction Methodology. Berlin: de Gruyter. ISBN 978-3-11-011908-4.
- ——— (1990). "On dating changes in the phonetic rules of Korean". Bochumer Jahrbuch zur Ostasienforschung. 14: 185–216.
- ——— (1991). "Recent research on the relationships of Japanese and Korean". In Lamb, Sydney M.; Mitchell, E. Douglas (eds.). Sprung from Some Common Source: Investigations into the Prehistory of Languages. Stanford, CA: Stanford University Press. ISBN 0-80-471-897-0.
- ——— (1995). "On the prehistory of Korean grammar: verb forms". Korean Studies. 19: 139–150. doi:10.1353/ks.1995.0023. JSTOR 23719144. S2CID 161570565.
- ——— (1996). "The Middle Korean marker of politeness -ngi". In Shim, Chaegi; et al. (eds.). Yi Kimun kyosu chongnyon toeim kinyom nonch'ong. Seoul: Shingu munhwasa.
- ——— (1997). "How did Korean get -l for Middle Chinese words ending in -t?". Journal of East Asian Linguistics. 6 (3): 263–271. doi:10.1023/A:1008214207016. JSTOR 20100722. S2CID 117950873.
- ——— (1997). "Un-Altaic features of the Korean verb". In Sohn, Ho-min; Haig, John (eds.). Japanese/Korean Linguistics, Volume 6. Stanford, California: Center for the Study of Languages and Information, Stanford University. ISBN 1-57586-089-9.
- ——— (2000). "How have Korean vowels changed through time?". Korean Linguistics. 10: 1–59. doi:10.1075/kl.10.01sem.
- ——— (2002). "Coming and going: deictic verbs in Korean and Japanese". In Lee, Sang-Oak; Iverson, Gregory K.; Ahn, Sang-Cheol; Cho, Young-mee Yu (eds.). Pathways into Korean Language and Culture: Essays in Honor of Young-Key Kim-Renaud. Seoul: Pagijong Press. ISBN 89-7878-609-X.

== See also ==
- Tadashi Kanehisa, Martin's informant for the Shodon dialect
