= History of Hangul =

History of the Korean alphabet

The Korean alphabet, known as Hangul internationally, Hangeul in South Korea, and Choson'gŭl in North Korea, is the native alphabet used to write the Korean language.

Before Hangul's creation, Korea had been using Hanja (Chinese characters) since antiquity. As Hanja was poorly suited for representing the Korean language, and because its difficulty contributed to high illiteracy, Joseon king Sejong the Great (r. 1418–1450) moved to create Hangul. The script was announced around late 1443 to early 1444 and officially published in 1446 via the text Hunminjeongeum and its companion commentary Hunminjeongeum Haerye. While Hangul saw gradual adoption among both the elite and commoners, it was looked down upon by the elite for centuries. It was only widely adopted in the late 19th century. It is now the predominant script for Korean in both Koreas and among the Korean diaspora. It is also used to write the Jeju language, and to a limited degree, the Cia-Cia language of Indonesia.

== Background ==
Some time in antiquity, Korea adopted writing in the form of Hanja (Chinese characters). There is a legend that, before that, during the Old Chosŏn period and around the time of the legendary ruler Tan'gun, Koreans used another original script dubbed "Sinji". Ahn is skeptical of the claim and argues there is no strong evidence to support its existence.

The difficulty of Hanja limited the script's use to mostly upper-class people; commoners were largely illiterate. Hanja is not well suited for representing the Korean language; the Chinese and Korean languages are not closely related and differ in significant ways. For example, Classical Chinese uses subject–verb–object word order while Middle Korean uses subject–object–verb word order. Korean pronunciation and ideas could only be indirectly represented. Some efforts were made to adapt the script to suit Korean, which resulted in the Idu script and its varieties, including Hyangch'al. Scholars have evaluated these scripts as complicated and difficult to decipher, and thus not useful for promoting widespread literacy. Classical Chinese was used for official documents and most works of literature, while Idu script was used for clerical documents and transactions.

=== Creation ===
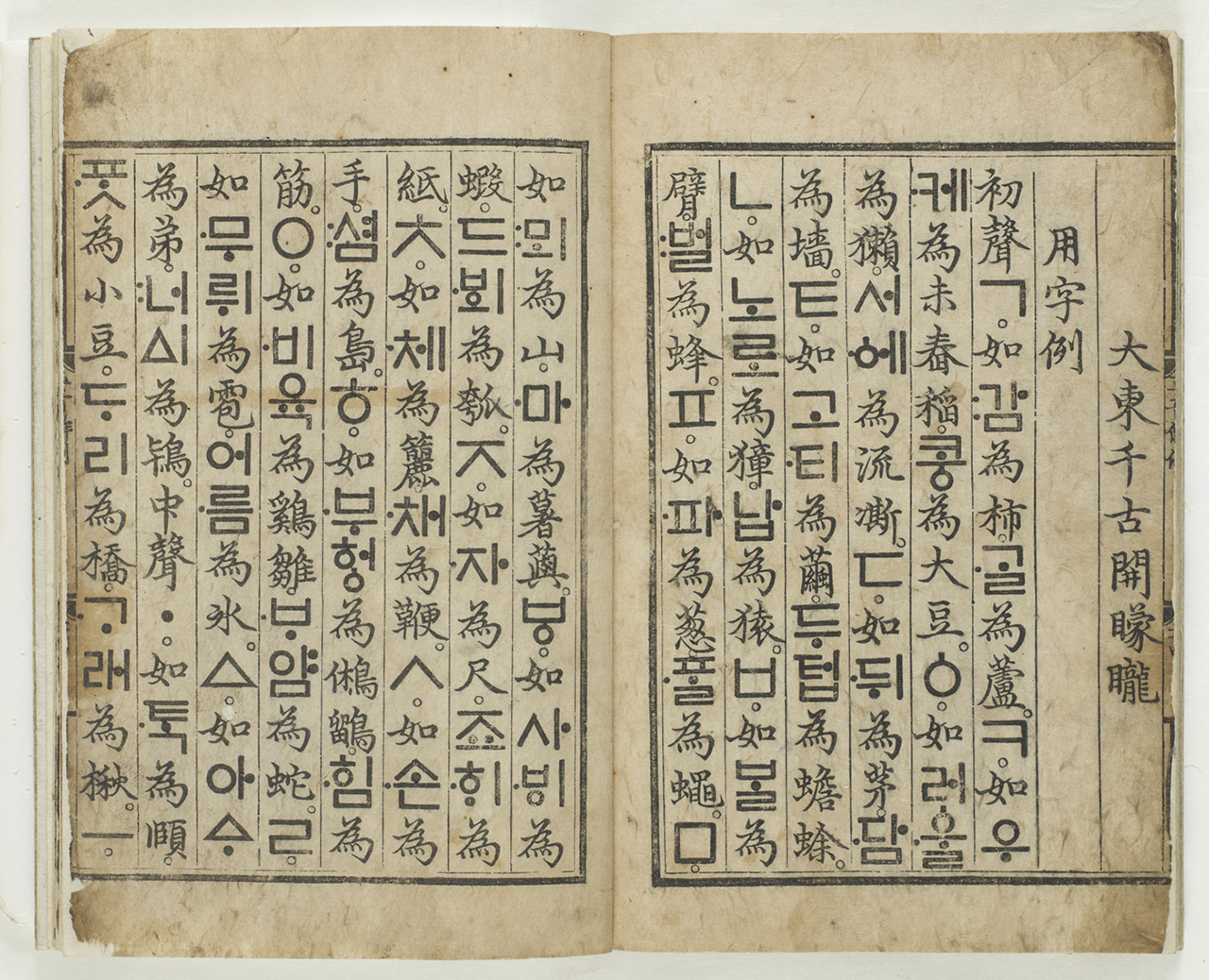
Pages of the Hunminjeongeum Haerye

Due to a lack of records, it is unknown when work on Hangul first began, nor what that process looked like. Sejong possibly developed the script in secret, although this is debated. Most scholars believe Sejong was significantly personally involved in the script's creation. A minority believe that he was the sole creator of it.

Hangul was first introduced, likely in a mostly complete form, to Sejong's court in the 12th month of 1443 of the Korean calendar (around December 30, 1443 to January 28, 1444, in the Gregorian calendar). Some time afterwards, Sejong had the office Ŏnmunch'ŏng (lit. 'Vernacular Script Commission') established. The office worked on applying Hangul and developing official documentation for it. In the 9th month of 1446, Hangul was officially promulgated via the introductory texts Hunminjeongeum and Hunminjeongeum Haerye. The Hunminjeongeum begins with this now famous preface by Sejong:

The sounds of our country's language are different from those of the Middle Kingdom and are not confluent with the sounds of characters. Therefore, among the ignorant people, there have been many who, having something they want to put into words, have in the end been unable to express their feelings. I have been distressed because of this, and have newly designed twenty-eight letters, which I wish to have everyone practice at their ease and make convenient for their daily use.

— Sejong the Great, Hunminjeongeum, preface

Critics of the script emerged soon after its introduction. They argued a native Korean script was too far a departure from Chinese civilization, which they insisted Korea should be deferent to in a Confucian manner. Modern historians have argued that elitism and self-interest were other motivators for the faction; literacy in Hanja was then seen as a status symbol and general literacy was seen as potentially harming the social positions of the elite.

Hangul was also referred to as ŏnmun (언문; 諺文; 'vernacular script') in contrast to Classical Chinese, which was referred to as chinmun (진문; 眞文; 'true script') or chinsŏ (진서; 眞書; 'true writing'). As such, although people generally knew how to write Hangul, it was excluded from the realm of official communication that was still dominated by Classical Chinese.

== Late 15th century ==
A number of scholars have argued that Hangul was only rarely used during the 15th century; its use was largely centered in Seoul, among people close to the royal family and court. Works in Hangul produced during this period drew little contemporary scholarly attention.

=== Sejong's attempts to spread the script ===
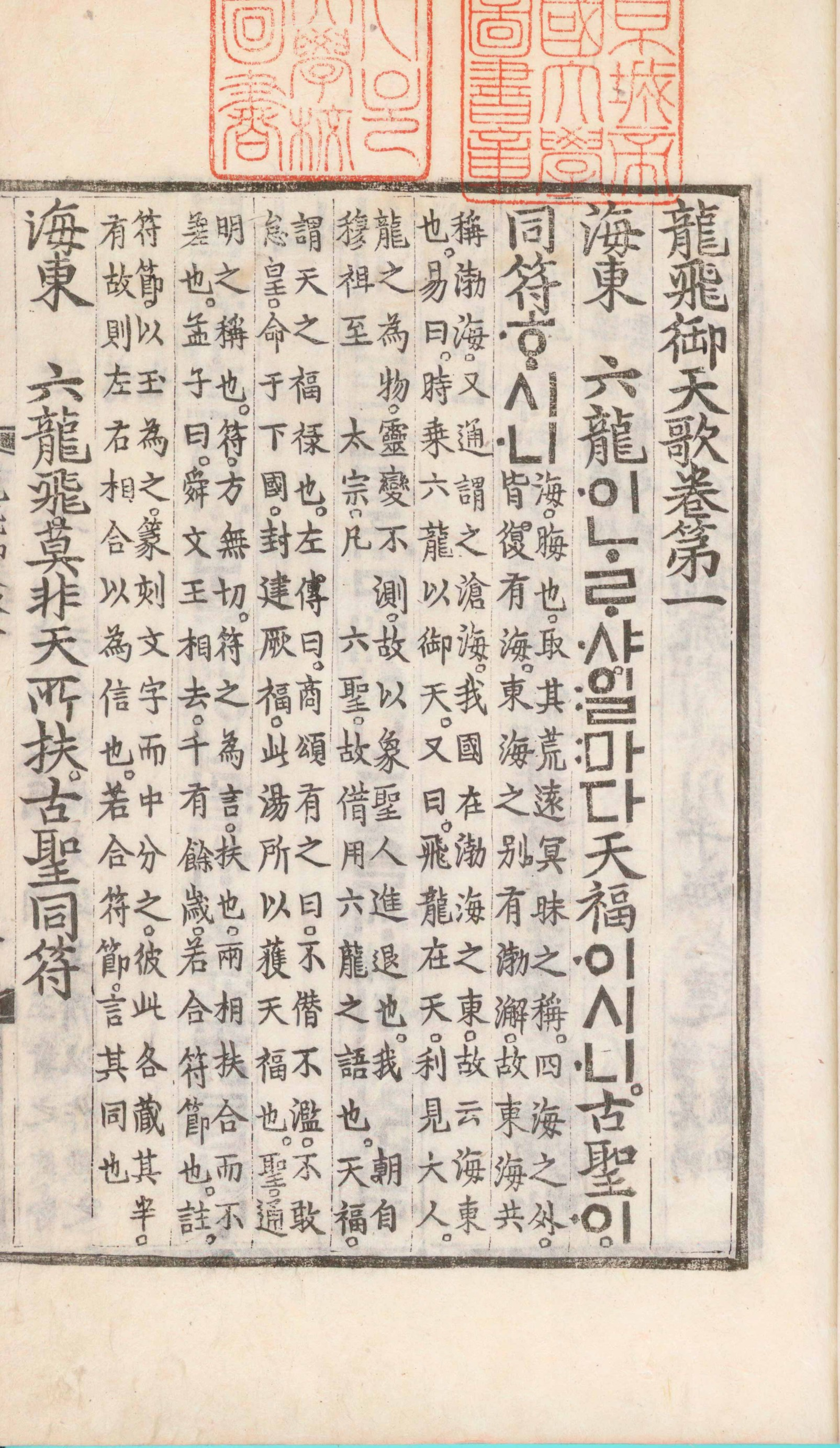
A page of Yongbiŏch'ŏn'ga, the first work of Hangul literature

Sejong attempted to lightly pressure his detractors and subjects into accepting the script, to limited success. Ahn argues Hunminjeongeum did not have firm, clear top-down edicts on where it should be used relative to Hanja, and to what degree. Ledyard argues that Sejong intentionally did not aggressively force the script on others as to avoid more severe backlash. Ledyard evaluated this hypothesized strategy favorably and said it likely contributed to Hangul's eventual success. For example, in the 10th month of 1446, Sejong submitted to the Ŭigŭmbu (bureau that investigated government misconduct) a long report written in Hangul of the government office Sahŏnbu's alleged misdeeds. When the Sahŏnbu protested, Sejong gave them a copy of the Hangul letter and asked them to familiarize themselves with the charges before complaining. He repeated similar stunts; each time he would ask of his detractors literacy in Hangul, to their chagrin.

Sejong made efforts to integrate Hangul into government functions, but these were largely unsuccessful. On the 26th day, 12th month of 1446, Sejong ordered that Hangul be included in the state examination for clerical officials. On the 20th day, 4th month of 1447, he made a similar order for regional official examinations. Sejong intended for Hangul to replace Idu script in clerical situations, but this effort fizzled out with Sejong's death. In 1447, it was proposed that the government school Sŏnggyun'gwan add Hangul to its curriculum, although Paek argues is unclear how long it maintained the subject. Sejong had a coin issued that was inscribed with a Hangul phrase hyoje yeŭi (효뎨례의; 孝悌禮義). Sejong also ordered that a Hangul copy of the Yongbiŏch'ŏn'ga, the first ever piece of Hangul literature, be included in the Veritable Records of Taejo.

Lee and Ramsey argue Sejong made a point of prioritizing non-Buddhist works in order to appease his detractors, but many of these plans failed to materialize. Otherwise, early major Hangul works produced during Sejong's lifetime were Buddhist. The first Hangul Buddhist work was the Sŏkposangjŏl. It was completed around 1447 to 1449, compiled by Grand Prince Suyang (later King Sejo), and dedicated to Queen Sohŏn's memory. The Wŏrin ch'ŏn'gangjigok was the next major Buddhist work; it was compiled by Sejong himself and published around the same time.

A number of anecdotes indicate that Sejong's immediate family quickly adopted and used the script. Crown Prince Yi Hyang possibly assisted Sejong in the script's development. On the 14th day, 11th month of 1447, it was proposed that Hangul be added to the curriculum of the crown prince. In 1451, Grand Prince Yangnyŏng wrote a letter to his nephew, King Munjong, in Hangul.

=== After Sejong's death ===
The Ŏnmunch'ŏng continued publishing major works in Hangul for decades after Sejong's death. In 1457, King Sejo (r. 1455–1468) established the organization Kan'gyŏng Togam, which oversaw the translation of Buddhist texts into Hangul. It was closed in 1471. In 1460, a proposal was submitted to have Hangul be an exam subject for civil servants, but Paek argued sparse records on the topic suggest that this policy did not last long. King Seongjong (r. 1469–1495) issued a royal decree in Hangul in 1472.

Royal and court women were significant early adopters and disseminators of Hangul. The first record of a woman's use of Hangul dates to 1453. A court woman named Myodan wrote to a royal concubine that another court woman had had an affair with a royal guard. On the 24th day, 8th month of 1458, the queen wrote the first known Hangul letter written by a queen. It was addressed to King Sejo. In 1465, a concubine wrote a secret love letter in Hangul to a royal family member that was intercepted. Eventually, women became the primary teachers of Hangul in the home, with mothers and grandmothers expected to teach the script to the children of the household.

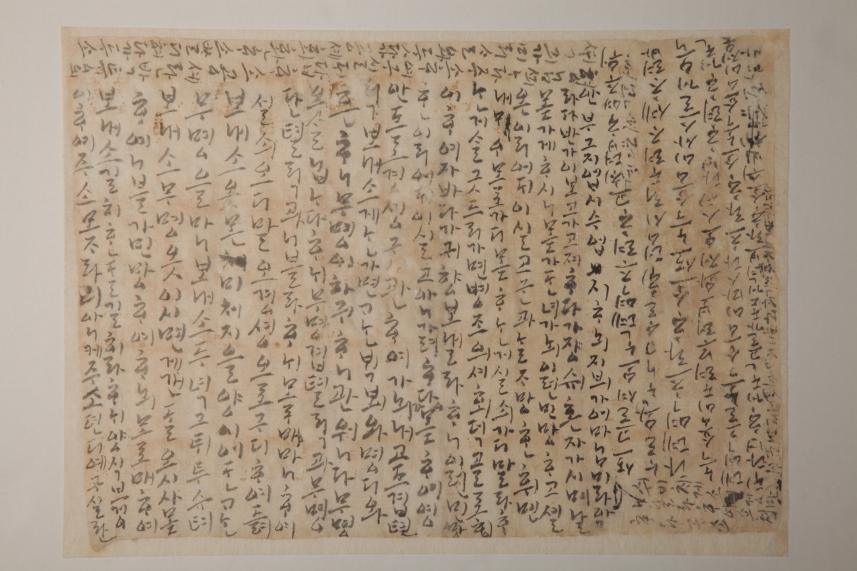
The letter by Na Sin'gŏl, the oldest surviving Hangul letter. It is estimated to date to the 1490s.

Hangul saw significant adoption in intimate private letters. Such letters, called ŏn'gan, were written by both women and men, although a majority of surviving letters were written by men to women. The oldest surviving Hangul letter is one by soldier Na Sin'gŏl to his wife, which is estimated to date to the 1490s.

Buddhists were also significant early adopters of Hangul. In 1467, Sinmi produced the Moguja susimgyŏl ŏnhae: a Hangul translation of a Goryeo-era Buddhist text. A 1500 republishing of that book became the first Hangul text to be published outside of Seoul; it was made at the temple Pongsŏsa (봉서사; 鳳栖寺) in Hapcheon County, Gyeongsang Province.

The earliest known attestation to the Japanese language being rendered in Hangul was in the 1492 text Irop'a. A Ryūkyūan language was rendered in Hangul in the 1471 Haedong chegukki.

== 16th century ==
It was not until the 16th century that Hangul began seeing significant organic usage, especially outside of the capital. By the late 16th century, limited numbers of people throughout Korea had attained literacy in Hangul, although most were illiterate. Overall, Hangul works would remain a significant minority of those published in this century.

During the 1504 second literati purge, after learning that criticisms of him had been published in Hangul, King Yeonsangun (r. 1495–1506) persecuted the use of the script. He demanded that a list be drawn up of the people who were literate in Hangul and ordered that Hangul books be burned. In 1506, the Ŏnmunch'ŏng was abolished.

In the early 16th century, numerous Buddhist temples worked on translating Buddhist works to Hangul. While such efforts had largely been limited to Seoul and funded by royal patronage, around this point they began to be done in the countryside with private donations. The first Hangul works to be primarily produced outside Seoul were the 1518 works Iryun haengsilto (이륜행실도; 二倫行實圖), Yŏssihyangyak ŏnhae, and Chŏngsok ŏnhae. Some Buddhist temples used lists of syllabaries called ŏnbon (언본; 諺本) as teaching aids for how to read and write Hangul.

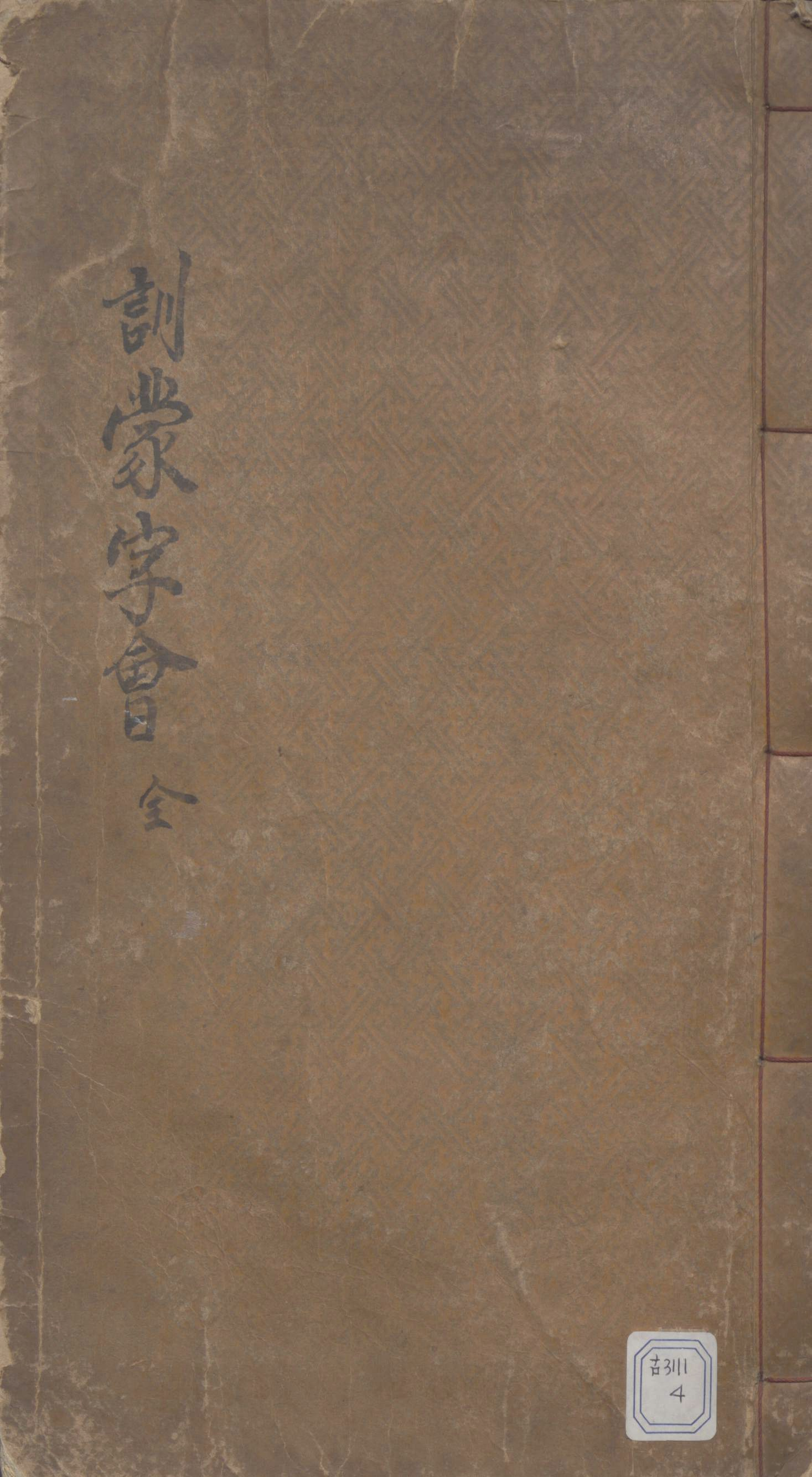
Cover of the landmark 1527 text Hunmong chahoe, by Ch'oe Sejin

Around this time, the Bureau of Interpreters was a significant presence in scholarship on and with Hangul. In particular, one of its members linguist Ch'oe Sejin (1468–1542) had a significant and lasting impact on Hangul and Korean linguistics, for which he is still revered. He wrote a wide variety of pedagogical texts on Hangul, including textbooks and dictionaries. His most famous work, the dictionary Hunmong chahoe, was the source of many of the current names of Hangul letters. It also was groundbreaking and useful for modern linguists in that it documented actual pronunciations of the time instead of attempting to enforce artificial prescriptivist pronunciations. A section at the end of the text, called Ŏnmun chamo (언문자모; 諺文字母), was an adaptation of the Hunminjeongeum meant to serve as a more practical guide for learning the script. Ahn evaluated it as a superior educational tool to the original, and argued that its structure made it a predecessor to the later panjŏl (반절; 反切) tables that became ubiquitous teaching tools for Hangul in the early modern period. A significant catalyst for Hangul's spread during this period was the rise of textbooks that relied on Hangul annotations to explain the Chinese script and language. In effect, this incentivized the literati to learn Hangul. Ch'oe Sejin produced a number of significant such works, including the Hunmong chahoe, Sasŏng t'onghae, and Nogŏltae.

The oldest surviving gravestone with Hangul written on it is the epitaph of Yi Yunt'ak, which was erected in 1536. It was designated a Treasure of South Korea in 2007.

The earliest known painting with Hangul on it is the 1576 Allakkuk t'aeja chŏnbyŏnsangdo (안락국태자전변상도; 安樂國太子傳變相圖); it is now located in Japan.

The 1586 Hangul letter to Yi Ŭngt'ae, which was written from a widow to her deceased husband, was rediscovered in 1998 and became a sensation in South Korea.

In 1593, during the 1592–1598 Imjin War, King Seonjo (r. 1567–1608) issued a royal edict written in Hangul to Korean commoners, a surviving copy of which is now a Treasure of South Korea.

== 17th to early 19th centuries ==
The Imjin War and the related famines and disease outbreaks were devastating to Korea. Publication of books ceased and only resumed 15 years later, with a more inconsistent orthography. Around this time, the Early Modern phase of the language began. The first two Hangul works to be published during the 17th century were the medical texts Ŏnhae tuch'ang chibyo and Ŏnhae t'aesan chibyo. The landmark novel Hong Gildong jeon was published around the beginning of the century. Other notable works from this century include the 1612 Yŏnbyŏng chinam (연병지남; 練兵指南), 1617 Tongguk sinsok samgang haengsilto, and 1676 Ch'ŏphae sinŏ.

Sijo poetry, which widely used Hangul, flourished during this era. Notable sijo compilations of this time include the 1728 Ch'ŏnggu yŏngŏn and 1763 Haedong kayo.

The earliest known attestation to the Manchu language being rendered in Hangul is the 1704 text Ch'ŏngŏ nogŏltae. For the Mongolian language, it is the 1737 text Ch'ŏphae mongŏ (첩해몽어; 捷解蒙語).

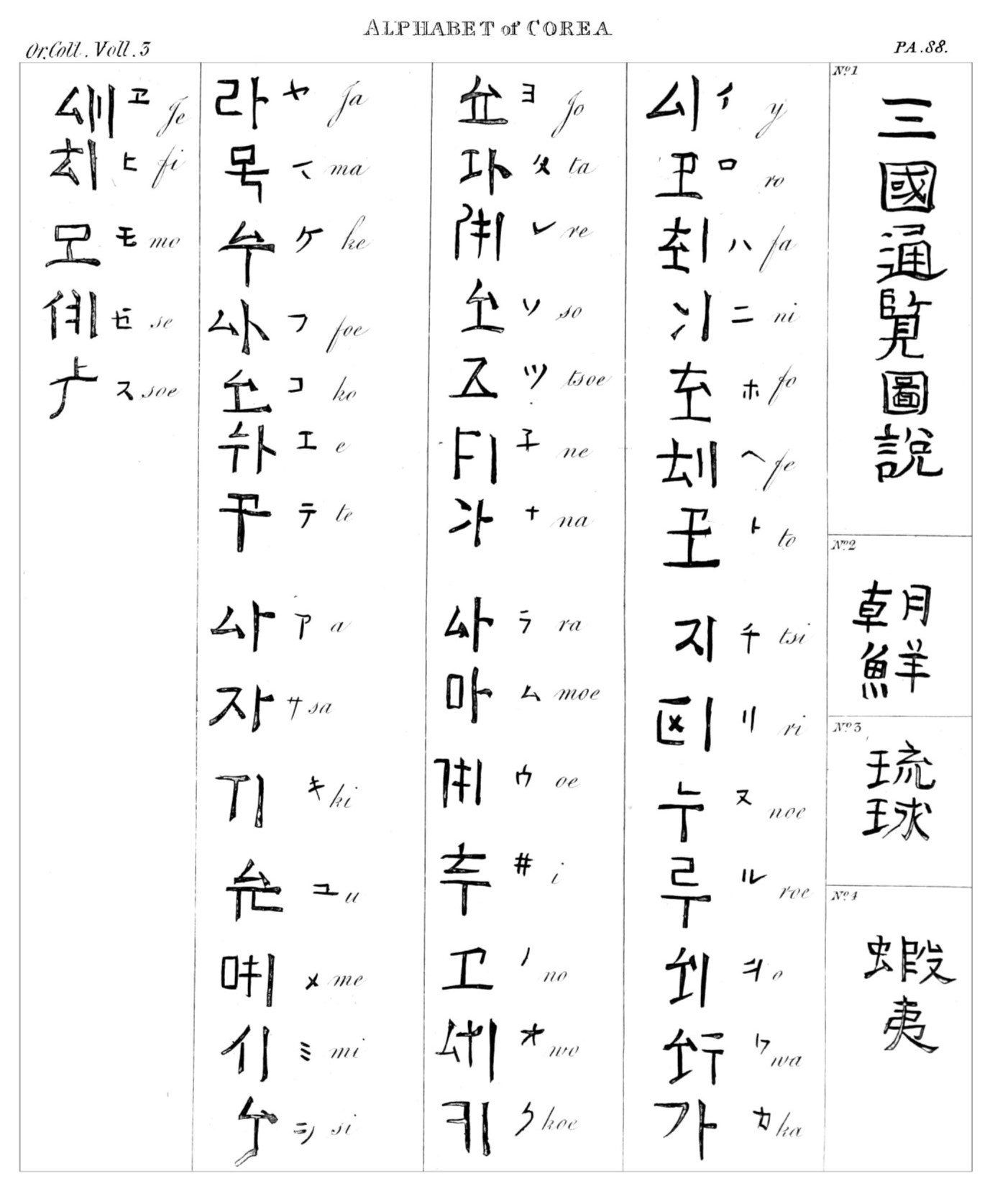
Page from the 1799 article Alphabet of Corea, the first scholarly description of Hangul published in Europe.

In the late 18th century, Europeans began learning of Hangul for the first time. In the late 1790s, a copy of the 1786 Japanese text Sangoku Tsūran Zusetsu, which contained Hangul writing, arrived in Europe. It was possibly the earliest, although other works possibly arrived earlier. It was brought to Europe by Dutch scholar Isaac Titsingh. Several years later, in 1799, the first scholarly description of Hangul in Europe, entitled Alphabet of Corea, was published.

The oldest known significant works (officially published works of non-trivial length; excludes documents like letters or family records) that are written in pure Hangul date to the mid-18th century.

== Enlightment period and Korean Empire ==
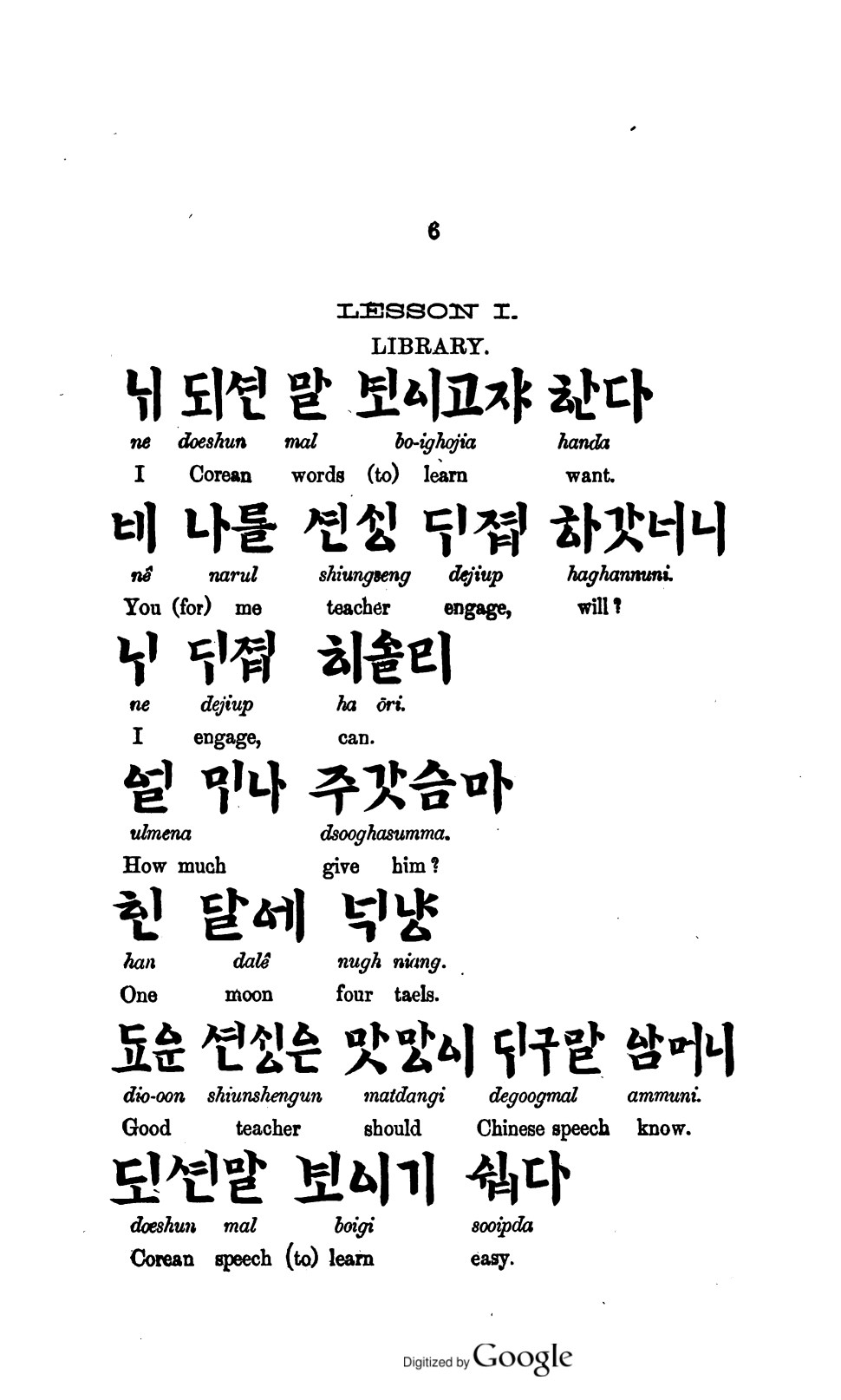
Page of the 1877 Corean Primer by Scottish missionary John Ross: the first Hangul work to use horizontal writing and spaces

With the end of Korea's isolationism in the 1870s, an influx of foreign ideas arrived in Korea. Mixed-script or pure Hangul works began to be associated with modernism and reform. Around this time, various Hangul reform movements arose, with many persisting into the rest of the 20th century. Collectively, these efforts are referred to as the Hangul Movement. One such reform movement, ŏnmun ilch'i (언문일치; 言文一致; lit. 'spoken–written agreement'), encouraged the use of Hangul and/or mixed script and the elimination of Idu script and Kugyŏl. A growing movement began advocating for only the exclusive use of Hangul and no Hanja.

Scottish missionary John Ross was a major figure in the history of Hangul. His 1877 work Corean Primer (조선어 첫걸음) is the earliest known work to use horizontal writing and spaces for Hangul. He also led the first complete translation of Christian New Testament into the Korean language, which was completed in 1887.

The first ever dictionary between a European language and Korean emerged in 1874: the Russian-Korean dictionary Opyt russko-korejskogo slovarja (Опыт русско-корейского словаря; 노한사전; 露韓辭典). The second such dictionary was the 1880 French-Korean dictionary Dictionnaire coréen-français (한불자전; 韓佛字典).

In 1888, a Morse code specification for Hangul was developed for the first time.

Hangul would not achieve significant government adoption until around 1894, during the Kabo Reform. On November 21, 1894, Hangul was officially made the preferred script for administrative documents, although mixed script was also allowed. The edict that announced its use referred to the script using the more dignified name kungmun (국문; 國文; lit. 'national script'). The government gazette Kwanbo (관보; 官報) began using Hangul in mixed script. Still, this edict was apparently enforced to varying degrees, as exclusive Hangul was rare in many documents even until the beginning of the colonial period.

Orthographic reform efforts also began. For example, in 1896, significant linguist Chu Sigyŏng (1876–1914) founded the Society for the Standardization of Korean Writing (국문동식회; 國文同式會). Chu was a major figure in the orthographic reform movement until his death. The term "Hangul" is also commonly considered to have been coined by him, around the 1910s.

The rise of newspapers in Korea was also affected by these reform efforts. In 1886, the Hansŏng chubo became the first Korean newspaper to use mixed script. In 1896, The Independent, one of the earliest independent modern Korean newspapers, was established. It was written in pure Hangul.

In 1895, the first government-sponsored modern textbook, Elementary Reader for Citizens (국민소학독본; 國民小學讀本), was published. It was written in mixed script. In 1897, the first Braille encoding for Hangul, called Pyongyang Point (평양점자), was invented by medical missionary Rosetta Sherwood Hall. It was a modification of New York Point.

A sinsosŏl genre of Hangul literature began to emerge, with notable works including the 1895 Sŏyu kyŏnmun (lit. 'Journey to the West') and the 1906 Hyŏrŭi nu. Such works played a significant role in disseminating Hangul use to the public. During the early 20th century, formal academic works came to be more commonly written in mixed script rather than pure Hanja.

During this period, Yu Kilchun published the first Korean grammar book: Chosŏn munjŏn. In 1910, Chu Sigyŏng published a more comprehensive grammar book: Kugŏ munpŏp.

== Colonial period ==
Korea was colonized by Japan in 1910. The first decade of the colonial period saw especially harsh restrictions on the Korean language and Hangul. Koreans worked on Hangul reform efforts in private. Meanwhile, the Japanese Government-General of Chōsen worked on developing its own orthographies for Hangul, which it would publish in 1912 and revise in 1921 and 1930. Korean-language and Hangul education were severely limited at this time.

The first complete Old Testament translation was completed in 1911. This meant that, for the first time, the entire Christian Bible had been translated into Korean and Hangul. From 1911 to 1914, Malmoi, which is considered by South Korea to be the first ever modern Korean dictionary, was developed by the organization Chosŏn Kwangmunhoe. It was never completed or published due to the death of Chu Sigyŏng.

After the 1919 March First Movement protests, the Japanese colonial government eased suppression of Korean culture in a phenomenon now dubbed cultural rule. Hangul use and reform significantly expanded as a result. Around this time, the use of Classical Chinese alone had largely ended.

In 1926, the first 6-dot Braille encoding for Hangul, entitled Hunmaeng chŏngŭm (훈맹정음; 訓盲正音), was published. A version of this system continues to be in use. In February 1927, the Korean Language Society began publishing the academic journal Hangeul.

Beginning in the mid-1930s, colonial pressure against the Korean language and Hangul increased, which eventually culminated in a 1938 restriction on the use of Korean in public, as well as another restriction on its education. Beginning in October 1942, the Korean Language Society incident took place. Colonial authorities accused the KLS of supporting the Korean independence movement and began arresting and torturing the KLS's members. Some members died during their imprisonment, and some were only released upon the 1945 liberation of Korea. Its activities were severely hampered until the liberation.

=== Hangul typewriters ===
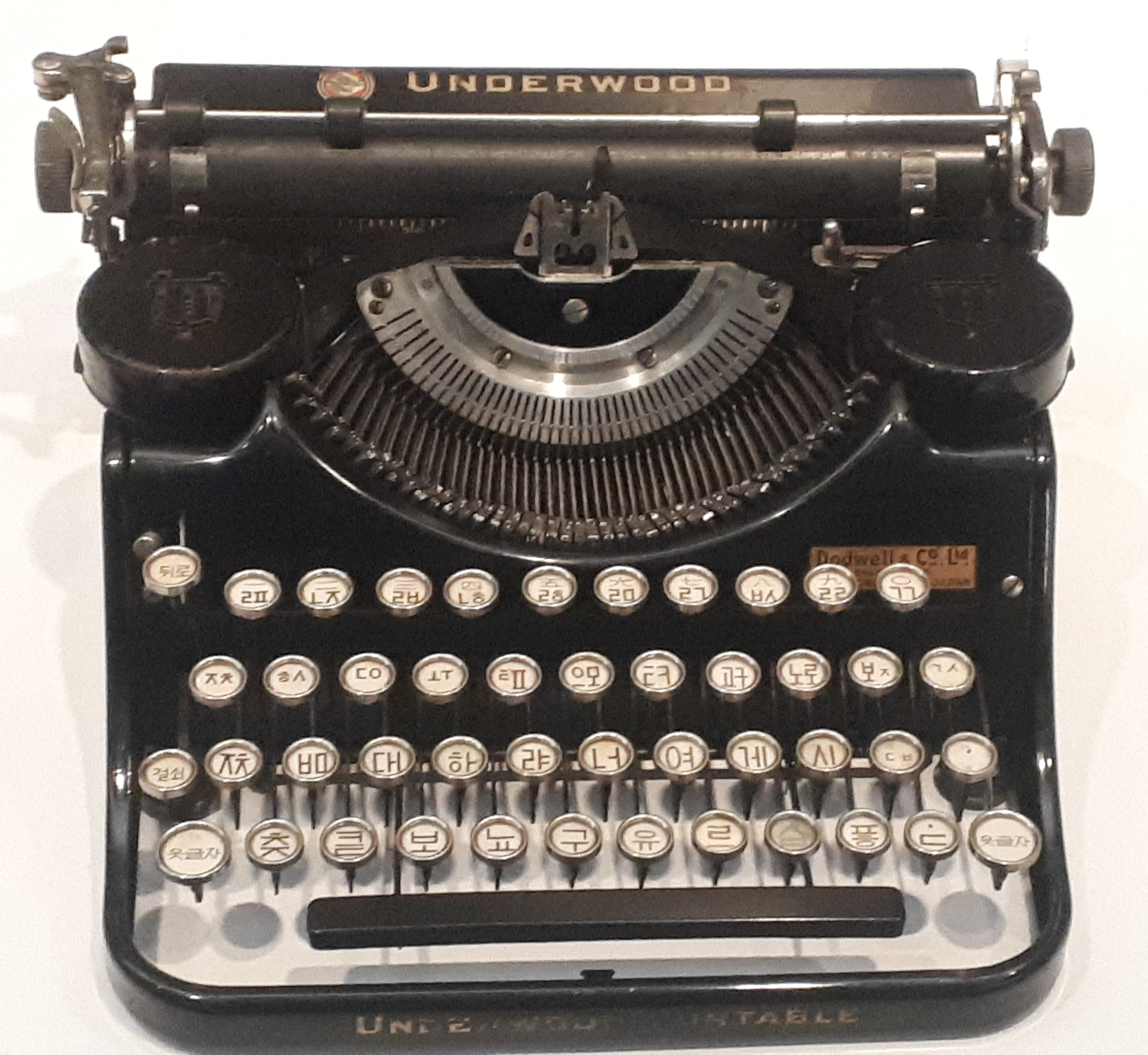
A Keith C. Song typewriter, first released in 1934

The first Hangul typewriter was invented in 1913 by Korean-American Wonic Leigh (이원익; Yi Wŏnik). It had 84 keys and wrote characters at a 90 degree angle; in order to read the text normally, the page needed to be rotated after writing was finished. The next Hangul typewriter was the 1934 Keith C. Song typewriter, developed by Keith C. Song (송기주; Song Kiju) for the Underwood Typewriter Company. Like the Wonic Leigh typewriter, it wrote at a 90 degree angle.

One of the most prominent Hangul typewriters in history was the Kong Byung-woo typewriter, invented by ophthalmologist Kong Byung-woo. Unlike past typewriters, it did not write at a 90 degree angle; text was able to be read upright while written. Also, its keys were in a Sebeolsik layout (three sets of keys: initial consonants, final consonants, and vowels). His model went on to achieve a degree of popular adoption.

== Russia and the USSR ==
Koreans, primarily from the northernmost tip of Hamgyong Province, began immigrating to the Russian Far East in significant numbers beginning around 1863. In 1937, they were forcefully moved to Central Asia. They and their descendents are now referred to as Koryo-saram. Those who still speak Korean speak a dialect called Koryo-mar, which is largely derived from the Hamgyŏng dialect.

In March 1914, the journal Taehanin chŏnggyobo, (Note: Original spelling: 대한인졍교보; 大韓人正敎報. Modernized spelling: 대한인정교보.) which was published from 1912 to 1914 from Chita, Zabaykalsky, published one of the earliest Koryo-saram orthographies.

After the establishment of the Soviet Union, the korenizatsiia policy, particularly the likbez campaign, sought to eliminate illiteracy through a variety of efforts, including orthographic reform. Such efforts were done on local languages and scripts, including Korean and Hangul. Early in the USSR's history, while many other languages and scripts of the USSR had established experts in Leningrad and Moscow, no such experts existed for Korean and Hangul. Many tasks related to language regulation and orthography fell to Koreans themselves. The first Soviet Korean-language book for adults was a 1925 Korean translation of the text Doloj negramotnost (Долой неграмотность), titled in Korean Musigŭl ŏpsihanŭn charaniŭi tokpon (무식을 없이하는 자란이의 독본). From 1924 to 1937, more than 140 Soviet Korean textbooks were produced. Hundreds of other books and translations were also published during this period, especially in the Korean enclave in Vladivostok. Many of these books advocated communist themes or were translations of Russian literature. In 1930, the book Koryŏ munjŏn (고려문전; 高麗文典) by O Ch'anghwan (오창환) was published. It became adopted as the de facto official Soviet Korean orthography.

Around the late 1920s to 1930s, the Soviet Latinization movement unsuccessfully attempted to supplant Hangul as the primary script for Korean. Several romanization proposals were made in the early to mid 1930s, but they were often received coldly by Koreans. Ultimately, none were adopted, and Hangul continued to be used.

On March 13, 1938, resolution No. 324 of the Council of People's Commissars of the Soviet Union ordered that Korean textbooks cease to be published. After the 1937 forced migration, Korean-language education was discouraged in favor of Russian-language. Hangul books were produced in significantly lower quantities. The newspaper Sŏnbong, which renamed to Lenin Kichi in 1938 and Koryo Ilbo in 1990, continues to publish in Hangul and has served as a center for Koryo-saram Korean-language literature.

== Division and modern history ==
Upon the August 1945 surrender of Japan, Korea was liberated but immediately divided between the Soviet Civil Administration (SCA) north of the 38th parallel and the United States Army Military Government in Korea (USAMGIK) to the south. This period was marked by significant turmoil. The two occupation zones became independent countries in 1948, and fought the Korean War between 1950 and 1953.

=== Southern and South Korea ===
Upon 1945 liberation, the literacy rate in the USAMGIK was low. One scholarly estimate put it at around 22%. The rate rapidly rose in following decades, reaching 59% in 1948 and 96% in 1958. Pae attributed the rapid rise in literacy to Hangul's accessibility.

By December 8, 1945, the USAMGIK had trained around 200 Hangul telegraph typists. They used a linearized orthography.

Mixed script continued to see use in newspapers until the 1990s, although some limited Hanja are still used.

==== Mixed script vs. Hangul exclusivity debate ====
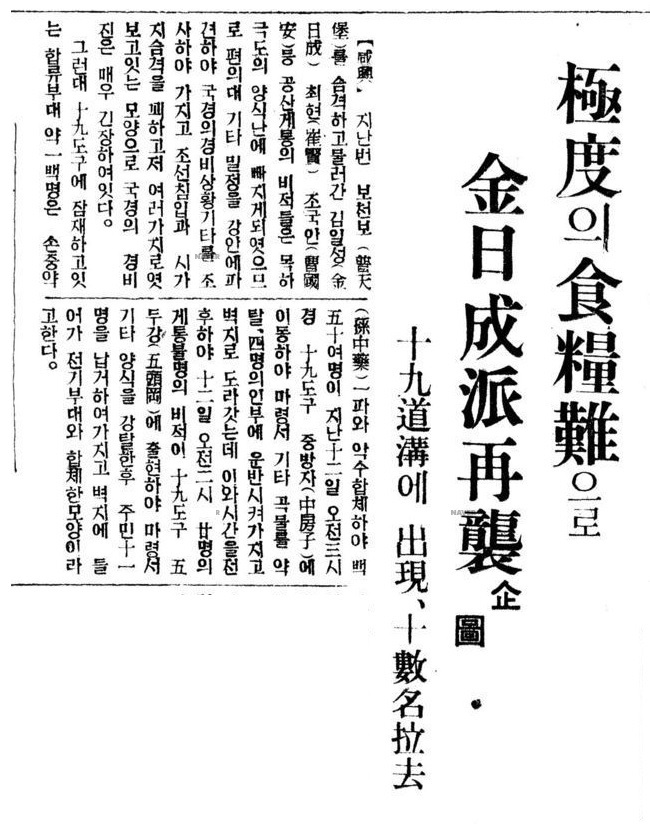
A 1937 article from The Dong-A Ilbo written in mixed script

For decades after the liberation, people debated the use of mixed script vs. Hangul exclusivity. While various government measures were promulgated in favor of Hangul exclusivity, they were regularly met with public backlash, and government policies oscillated between the two sides. Even weeks after the establishment of the United States Army Military Government in Korea (USAMGIK), organizations such as the Preparatory Committee for the Realization of the Abolition of Hanja (한자폐지실행회발기취지준비위원회) published statements in favor of abolishing mixed script and Hanja usage. The Korean Language Society pushed for Hangul exclusivity, even describing the allowance of limited Hanja use as "the greatest enemy of the exclusive use of Hangul". In 1948, the Act on Hangul Usage (한글전용에 관한 법률) was promulgated. However, in 1950, the Ministry of Education approved the teaching of Hanja in elementary schools. In 1957, the cabinet passed a resolution in favor of Hangul exclusivity, which provoked backlash from the media and parts of the literati.

In 1961, the Supreme Council for National Reconstruction that was installed by the May 16 coup ordered further Hangul exclusivity measures. On April 17, 1962, it established the Special Council on the Exclusive Use of Hangul (한글전용특별심의회). The government continually pushed for Hangul exclusivity. Around 1969, the military began using only Hangul. The government banned Hanja in schooling in 1969, but reversed course in 1974.

=== Northern and North Korea ===
Soon after the liberation, the SCA began a systematic campaign to teach Hangul and eradicate illiteracy. Thousands of literacy programs were established throughout the country, and significant progress was made, possibly even faster than that of the USAMGIK and South Korea.

In 1949, North Korea officially brought an end to the use of mixed script. Its use in newspapers largely ended by late 1949. However, Hanja education was revived in 1953; North Korean children have since been educated in 1,800 Hanja characters. North Korean leader Kim Il Sung protested the continued use of Hanja, and pushed to minimize their use.

=== Computing ===
In 1967, a computer (an IBM 1401) arrived in South Korea for the first time. From there, work quickly began on implementing Korean scripts for computers. Sung Ki Soo (성기수), considered the "godfather of Korean computing", was an early pioneer in this area. During the 1970s, various government and private organizations developed Hangul-compatible hardware and software, such as computer keyboards and databases.

Different organizations developed different methods for representing Hangul on computers, which caused issues with compatibility. Implementation of combining Hangul jamo into syllables can be divided into two broad approaches: the composition model (also called Johab) and the precomposed model (also called Wansung). Johab considers syllables to be a combination of letters, while Wansung renders syllables as entire fixed blocks. Computing technology often did not sufficiently support the 11,172 Wansung syllables. Such a large character set negatively impacted memory and data transfer speeds.

In 1974, the South Korean government attempted for the first time to establish a Hangul encoding standard: KS C 5601 (predecessor to the current KS X 1001). It followed the Johab model and used 7 bits for character codes. It could not accommodate the Latin alphabet. It was updated in 1984 and used 2 bytes for each character code. The standard was only a recommendation, and not a hard requirement. It was not widely adopted; 27 different standards were in use around 1985.

The South Korean government's National Basic Information System (NBIS) project aimed to computerize the government and society. One of its explicit aims was to resolve Hangul encoding standardization issues. To this end, the Korean Standards Research Institute (KSRI) led the development of a new version of KS C 5601, compatible with the international standard ISO/IEC 2022, that was eventually published in 1987. It followed Wansung, and accounted for the most common 2,350 possible syllables. Although the government argued that number of syllables was enough to represent over 99.9% of actual Hangul use, the system faced criticism. The government mandated the system's use, and it was adopted largely without incident over the following years.

The Korean computing industry grew dramatically in the 1980s. Between 1987 and 1990 alone, the number of personal computers in the country grew 14-fold. Correspondingly, the number of critics of KS C 5601 grew, with groups arguing for different changes to it. Nationalism became tied into the debate; some felt that the Johab model was more authentic to the spirit of Hangul than Wansung. As South Korea was experiencing significant globalization around this time, various groups expressed skepticism of adopting foreign standards and advocated for maintaining a distinct local identity.

In 1985, the Hangul word processor Boseokgeul was released. It was a modified version of the Western program T/Maker. It used the Johab model to render the 11,172 syllables. It could not render archaic Hangul nor many Hanja characters. In 1989, the first native Korean word processor, Hangul, was developed. It came to dominate the domestic word processor marketplace.

In 1990, the Roh Tae-woo administration established the Ministry of Culture (MOC), which advocated for significant changes to KS, including a move to Johab. In 1992, the MOC announced that it would make Johab an acceptable alternative to Wansung. While this satisfied critics of KS, it caused further issues with compatibility and standardization. The company Microsoft developed its own Hangul encoding standard for Windows 95: Unified Hangul Code (UHC). Because the standard used Wansung, it was quickly met with criticism. The MOC forced a delay on Windows 95's release until changes were made to the UHC.

In 1992, the Korean Bureau of Standards (KBS) established a committee for working with the International Standards Organization (ISO); part of its work included integrating Hangul into Unicode. The task of integrating Hangul into Unicode was controversial. The nature of Hangul was poorly understood abroad. Some reportedly thought that Hangul only needed enough spaces for its basic jamo. Joe Becker, a central figure behind Unicode's establishment, even incorrectly wrote in 1988 that Hangul had 2,560 possible syllable blocks.

In 1995, South Korea adopted ISO 10646-1, the Universal Coded Character Set, as its standard, in KS C 5700. This was later renamed KS X 1005–1.

== Hangul shorthand ==
Hangul shorthand encoding systems saw limited use before the 1945 liberation, but only began to see practical use after that. Various systems were developed in the 1940s and 1950s. After the 1948 establishment of South Korea, the National Assembly had its stenographers adopt a variety of styles. In 1969, the parliamentary style Hangul shorthand (의회식; 議會式; Uihoesik) was developed and became the widespread standard, although other standards continued to be used. The need for Hangul shorthand faded with the rise of computerized stenography in the 1990s.

== History of letter names ==
=== Vowel names ===
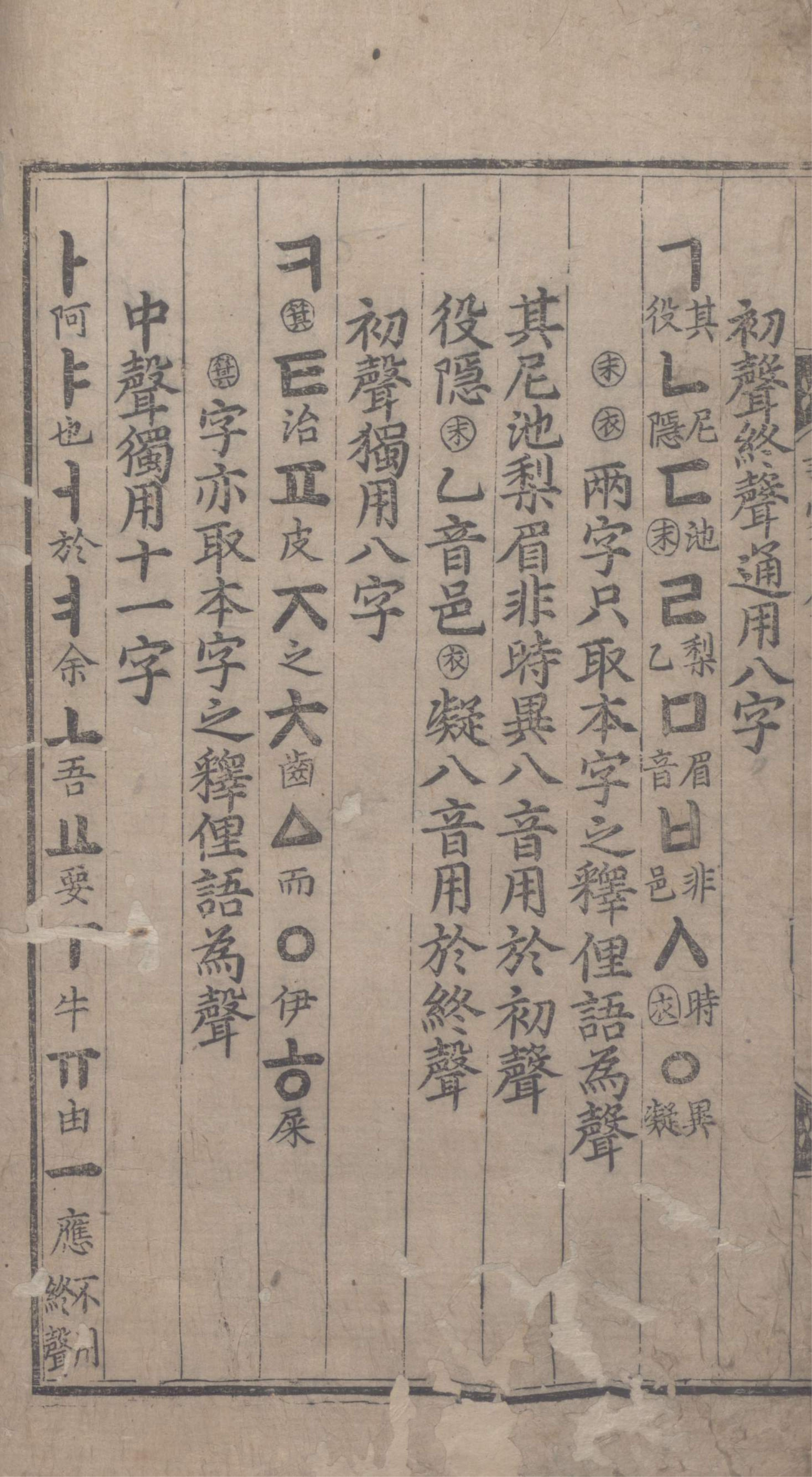
Page on Hunmong chahoe introducing letter names

Since the 1527 work Hunmong chahoe, vowels have been consistently named after the sound they produce if attached to a ㅇ, for example ㅑ is named ya.

=== Consonant names ===
Consonants have individual names, although these have varied across time and now between North and South Korea. Names were not recorded for the letters when they were first promulgated in 1446. Names for the base consonants were first attested to in Ch'oe Sejin's landmark 1527 work Hunmong chahoe, although it is unclear if Ch'oe coined the names himself. (Note: Many possibly incorrectly believe that Ch'oe coined the names. However, that is not clear from the text. Ch'oe states elsewhere in the work that his intent was to document current practice at the time. His work is the earliest known attestation to these names.) These names have formed the basis of the modern letter names.

The 1933 Unified Hangul Orthography (UHO) preserved several historical spellings of names, like giyeok, but adopted the ㅣ으 pattern for the non-final consonants that had ㅣ names in the Hunmong chahoe. It was decided to do this as those letters had become used as finals by this point. South Korea still maintains the names chosen by the UHO. It was felt that some of these names had a long tradition, and keeping them would be minimally disruptive. North Korea adopted the apparent intended names of the consonants that broke the ㅣ으 pattern and uses toen (된; lit. 'hard', referring to the harder pronunciation) instead of ssang (쌍; 雙; lit. 'double', referring to letter shapes) for the duplicated consonants (e.g. 된기윽; toen'giŭk).

== History of alphabetic orders ==
The alphabetic orders of the letters has changed over time and continues to vary between North and South Korea.

The Yeui portion of the Hunminjeongeum (the part by Sejong) does not explicitly give letter orders. However, it does introduce the letters in these orders:

Initial consonants: ㄱ ㅋ ㆁ ㄷ ㅌ ㄴ ㅂ ㅍ ㅁ ㅈ ㅊ ㅅ ㆆ ㅎ ㅇ ㄹ ㅿ
Vowels: ㆍ ㅡ ㅣ ㅗ ㅏ ㅜ ㅓ ㅛ ㅑ ㅠ ㅕ

Orders in the 1527 Hunmong chahoe These orders heavily influenced later orders, including the orders now used in North and South Korea. They are the following:

Consonants: ㄱ ㄴ ㄷ ㄹ ㅁ ㅂ ㅅ ㆁ ㅋ ㅌ ㅍ ㅈ ㅊ ㅿ ㅇ ㅎ
Vowels: ㅏ ㅑ ㅓ ㅕ ㅗ ㅛ ㅜ ㅠ ㅡ ㅣ ㆍ

The 1933 Unified Hangul Orthography gives the following orders:

Consonants: ㄱ ㄴ ㄷ ㄹ ㅁ ㅂ ㅅ ㅇ ㅈ ㅊ ㅋ ㅌ ㅍ ㅎ
Vowels: ㅏ ㅑ ㅓ ㅕ ㅗ ㅛ ㅜ ㅠ ㅡ ㅣ

It also separately gives orders for the following combined letters, without specifying how these are ordered relative to the above consonants and vowels:

Consonants: ㄲ ㄸ ㅃ ㅆ ㅉ
Vowels: ㅐ ㅒ ㅔ ㅖ ㅘ ㅙ ㅚ ㅝ ㅞ ㅟ ㅢ

North Korea uses the following orders:

Initial consonants: ㄱ ㄴ ㄷ ㄹ ㅁ ㅂ ㅅ ㅈ ㅊ ㅋ ㅌ ㅍ ㅎ ㄲ ㄸ ㅃ ㅆ ㅉ ㅇ (Note: The initial ㅇ is introduced in North Korea's official Compendium of Korean Language Norms after ㅅ. Some non–North Korean scholarly sources also use that ordering. This ordering places ㅇ at the end because, when it is an initial, it does not produce its own sound. In 1999, North Korea submitted a proposal to Unicode and ISO (that was eventually rejected) that places ㅇ at the end of the order for initial consonants.)
Vowels: ㅏ ㅑ ㅓ ㅕ ㅗ ㅛ ㅜ ㅠ ㅡ ㅣ ㅐ ㅒ ㅔ ㅖ ㅚ ㅟ ㅢ ㅘ ㅝ ㅙ ㅞ
Final consonants: ∅ ㄱ ㄳ ㄴ ㄵ ㄶ ㄷ ㄹ ㄺ ㄻ ㄼ ㄽ ㄾ ㄿ ㅀ ㅁ ㅂ ㅄ ㅅ ㅇ ㅈ ㅊ ㅋ ㅌ ㅍ ㅎ ㄲ ㅆ

South Korea uses the following orders:

Initial consonants: ㄱ ㄲ ㄴ ㄷ ㄸ ㄹ ㅁ ㅂ ㅃ ㅅ ㅆ ㅇ ㅈ ㅉ ㅊ ㅋ ㅌ ㅍ ㅎ
Vowels: ㅏ ㅐ ㅑ ㅒ ㅓ ㅔ ㅕ ㅖ ㅗ ㅘ ㅙ ㅚ ㅛ ㅜ ㅝ ㅞ ㅟ ㅠ ㅡ ㅢ ㅣ
Final consonants: ∅ ㄱ ㄲ ㄳ ㄴ ㄵ ㄶ ㄷ ㄹ ㄺ ㄻ ㄼ ㄽ ㄾ ㄿ ㅀ ㅁ ㅂ ㅄ ㅅ ㅆ ㅇ ㅈ ㅊ ㅋ ㅌ ㅍ ㅎ

== History of style ==
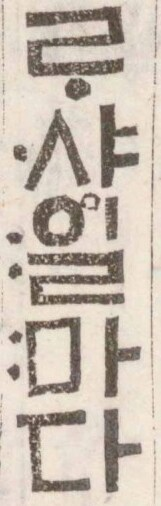
In the 1446 Hunminjeongeum Haerye (left), vowels were written with dots. In the 1447 Yongbiŏch'ŏn'ga (right), they were written with lines.

The style of Hangul jamo has changed over time. Originally, jamo in the 1446 Hunminjeongeum were highly geometric. They had regular, symmetrical shapes, were all sans-serif, and had perfectly straight lines and no curves. ㆍ was a simple round dot. In addition, vowels did not use the small short lines used today, but instead small dots. This style was difficult to draw with ink brushes of the time, and also unfamiliar to people literate in Hanja.

In the text Yongbiŏch'ŏn'ga, which was published the year after the Hunminjeongeum, dots in vowels were changed to short lines to make them easier to write and distinguish. Over the following 50 years, the letters became less geometric. The sizes of letters within each syllable block also changed to be more proportional. Serifs gradually became added, likely a natural product of writing with a brush.

For consonants, the letter ㄱ changed from using perfectly straight perpendicular lines to having a more curved shape, with the right-hand vertical line curving to the left. The letter ㅈ changed from its original form of a line above the center of a ㅅ to a shape resembling the katakana letter ス. By the 18th century, the letter ㅌ became popularly drawn as a letter ㄷ with a line above it. The letter ㅅ was originally written as two straight lines of equal size connected at their tops. By the late 16th century, the right line was typically drawn smaller and connected to the center of the left line. The lines on the top of ㅊ and ㅎ became drawn similar to the ideographic comma (、). The rest of ㅊ experienced similar changes to those of ㅈ.

The extended vowels also experienced changes in style. When the extended vowels were first introduced, they were drawn as disjointed ㆍ next to some base line. For example, ㅛ was originally drawn as two ㆍ above an ㅡ. This dot style was maintained for only two works: the 1446 Hunminjeongeum Haerye and the 1448 Tongguk chŏngun. Subsequent works drew the dots as small lines connected to the main line.

Linguist Kong Byung-woo, who developed a revolutionary practical Hangul typewriter in 1949, created a new font style while doing so: tallemo (탈네모; lit. 'abandoning the square'). His typewriter prioritized speed over style; syllable blocks it produced were uneven and did not neatly fit in traditional square blocks. This style eventually became popular in its own right, even after the need for it passed. Several modern computer fonts now reproduce aspects of its style.

== See also ==
- Hangul orthography § History
