= List of early Hangul works =

The Korean alphabet, now called Hangul or Hangeul and Chosŏn'gŭl, was invented around 1443 to 1444 and officially promulgated in 1446. However, it did not see significant scholarly or government adoption until the 19th century. Works that used the script, especially those produced in the 15th and 16th centuries, have been considered valuable resources for the study of the history of the script and of the Korean language.

Early Hangul (often used in mixed script) translations of Classical Chinese texts were customarily called ŏnhae (언해; 諺解). Ŏnhae used Hangul in a variety of ways. Most placed Hangul alongside Hanja in the main body of text, most used Hangul as pronunciation aids for Hanja, and some placed Hangul and Hanja in separate paragraphs.

This list documents significant literary works produced before the 1592–1598 Imjin War that significantly utilize either pure Hangul or mixed script. Texts like the original Hunminjeongeum Haerye, which are predominantly in Hanja but introduce Hangul symbols and syntax, have been excluded.

== History ==
In the 15th and 16th centuries, Hangul texts were a significant minority. Most texts were written in Hanja. Until the beginning of the 16th century, such texts were likely almost entirely produced and consumed in the capital Hanyang (now called "Seoul"). The first Hangul work to be produced outside the capital was a 1500 reproduction of the 1467 text Moguja susimgyŏl ŏnhae, which was produced in the temple Pongsŏsa (봉서사; 鳳栖寺) in Hapcheon County. The first original texts to be produced outside of the capital were produced in 1518.

== 15th-century works ==
- Yongbiŏch'ŏn'ga, 1447
- Sŏkposangjŏl, 1447–1449
- Tongguk chŏngun, 1447–1448
- Wŏrin ch'ŏn'gangjigok, 1447–1449
- Hunminjŏngŭm ŏnhae, Korean translation of the Hunminjeongeum; produced around the reign of Sejong or shortly afterwards
- Chikhae tongjasŭp (직해동자습; 直解童子習), 1453
- Sasŏng t'onggo (사성통고; 四聲通攷), before 1455
- Hongmu chŏngun yŏkhun, 1455
- Wŏrin sŏkpo, 1459
- Nŭngŏmgyŏng ŏnhae (translation of the Śūraṅgama Sūtra), 1462
- Pŏphwagyŏng ŏnhae (법화경언해; 法華經諺解; translation of the Lotus Sutra), 1463
- Kŭmganggyŏng ŏnhae (translation of the Diamond Sutra), 1464
- Sŏnjong yŏnggajip ŏnhae, 1464
- Amit'agyŏng ŏnhae (아미타경언해; 阿彌陀經諺解; translation of the Amitābha Sūtra)
- Wŏn'gakkyŏng ŏnhae, 1465
- Kugŭppang ŏnhae (구급방언해; 救急方諺解), 1466
- Moguja susimgyŏl ŏnhae, 1467
- Mongsan Hwasang pŏbŏ yangnok ŏnhae (몽산화상법어약록언해; 蒙山和尙法語略錄諺解), 1472
- Naehun, 1475
- Tusi ŏnhae, 1481
- Samganghaengsilto ŏnhae, 1481
- Kŭmgang kyŏng samga hae (금강경삼가해; 金剛經三家解), 1482
- Yŏngga taesa chŭngdo ka Nammyŏngch'ŏn sŏnsa kyesong ŏnhae, 1482
- Pulchŏng simgyŏng ŏnhae (불정심경언해; 佛頂心經諺解), 1485
- Yŏnghŏm yakch'o ŏnhae (영험약초언해; 靈驗略抄諺解), 1485
- Kugŭp kanibang, 1489
- Irop'a, 1492
- Akhak kwebŏm, 1493
- Yukcho pŏppodan kyŏng ŏnhae (육조법보단경언해; 六祖法寶壇經諺解), 1496
- Sisik kwŏn'gong ŏnhae (시식권공언해; 施食勸供諺解), 1496 (Note: Ahn claims this is the final Hangul work to be published in the 15th century.)

== 16th-century works ==
- Soksamganghaengsilto (속삼강행실도; 續三綱行實圖), 1514
- Sasŏng t'onghae, 1517
- Pŏnyŏk nogŏltae (1517)
- Pŏnyŏk Pak t'ongsa (1517)
- Iryun haengsilto (이륜행실도; 二倫行實圖), 1518 (Note: Ahn claims these works are the first to have been produced outside of the capital.)
- Yŏssihyangyak ŏnhae, 1518
- Pŏnyŏk sohak (번역소학; 飜譯小學), 1518
- Chŏngsok ŏnhae, 1518
- Kani pyŏgonbang ŏnhae, 1525
- Hunmong chahoe, 1527
- Uma yangjŏ yŏmyŏkpyŏng ch'iryobang (우마양저염역병치료방; 牛馬羊猪染疫病治療方), 1541
- Punmun onyŏk ihaebang (분문온역이해방; 分門瘟疫易解方), 1542
- Pulsŏldaebo pumo ŭnjunggyŏng ŏnhae (불설대보부모은중경언해; 佛說大報父母恩重經諺解), 1545 (Note: Earliest known version. Later versions were published, including one Ahn mentions in 1553.)
- Sŏnggwanjajaegusu yukcha sŏnjŏng ŏnhae (성관자재구수육자선정언해; 聖觀自在求修六字禪定諺解), 1560
- Ch'iltae manbŏp (칠대만법; 七大萬法), 1569
- Sŏn'ga kwigam ŏnhae (선가귀감언해; 禪家龜鑑諺解), 1569
- Yaun chagyŏngsŏ ŏnhae (야운자경서언해; 野雲自警序諺解), 1577
- Sohak ŏnhae, 1587
- Sasŏ yulgok ŏnhae (사서율곡언해; 四書栗谷諺解), 1590
