= Bureau of Interpreters =

1393–1894 Korean government agency

Coordinates: 37.5723°N 126.9748°E

- Hangul: 사역원
- Hanja: 司譯院
- RR: Sayeogwon
- MR: Sayŏgwŏn

The Bureau of Interpreters or Sayŏgwŏn was an agency of the Joseon government of Korea from 1393 to 1894 responsible for training and supplying official interpreters. Textbooks for foreign languages produced by the bureau aimed to accurately describe contemporary speech and are thus valuable sources on the history of Korean and the various foreign languages.

== History ==
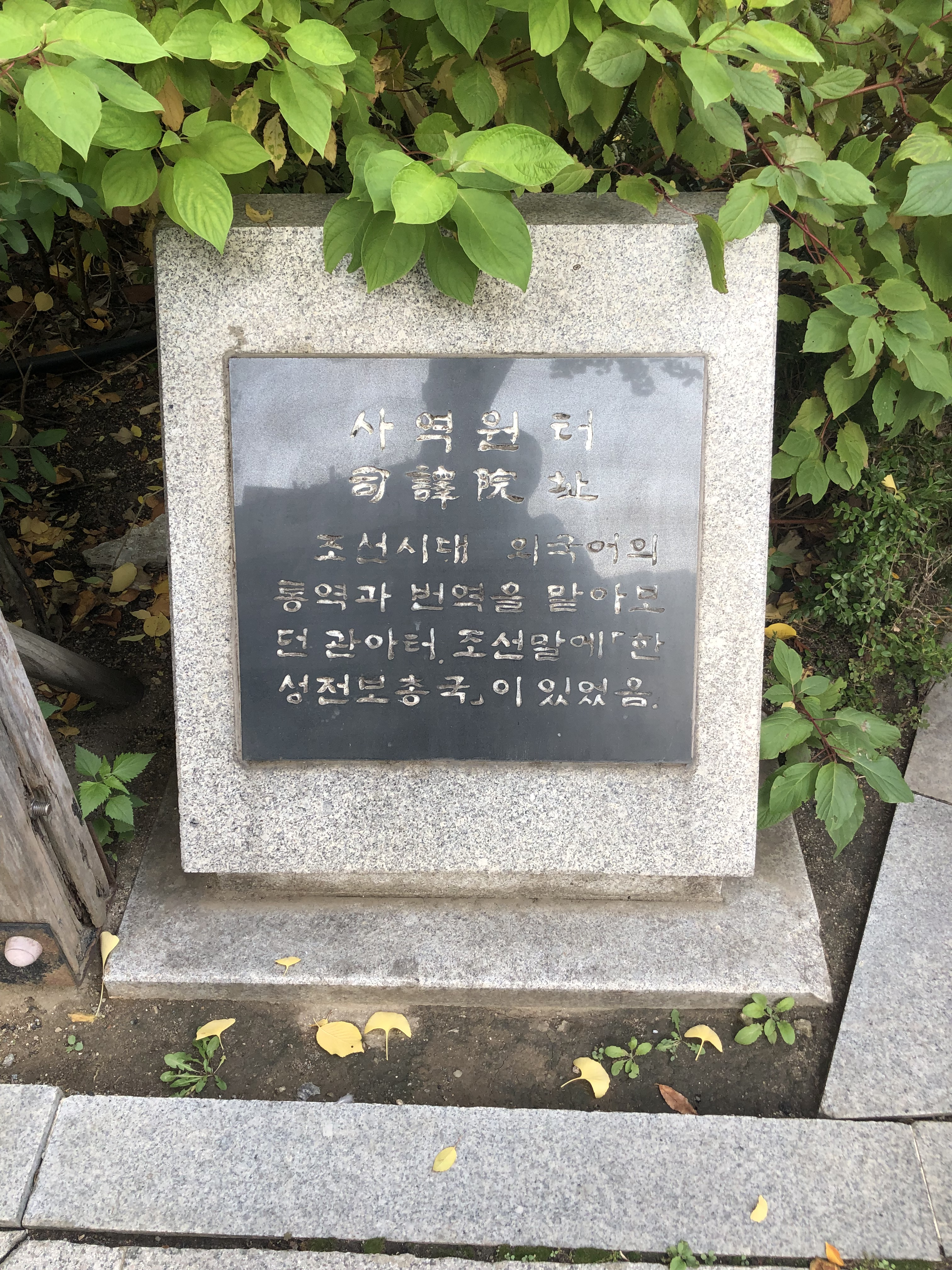
Plaque marking the former site of the bureau

In a country surrounded by linguistically distinct neighbours, Korean diplomacy has always relied on interpreters. They were a vital part of the national foreign policies of sadae 'serving the great' (i.e. China) and gyorin 'neighbourly relations'. King Chungnyeol of Goryeo established the T'ongmun'gwan (通文館 'Office of Interpretation') in 1276 to train interpreters in Chinese and (possibly) Mongolian.

In 1393, the second year of the Joseon period, the Bureau of Interpreters was established as part of the Ministry of Rites. Regulations stipulated that its director would be an official of the principal third rank. The bureau operated until 1894, when it was abolished as part of the Gabo Reforms. The bureau was based in buildings to the west of the Six Ministries in the central district of the capital, Hanyang (modern Seoul). The site is marked by a plaque on Saemunan-ro 5-gil behind the Sejong Center for the Performing Arts.

== Languages ==
A memorial from 1394 mentions instruction in Chinese and Mongolian. The most important and most taught language was always Chinese, reflecting Korea's key foreign relationship and the sadae policy. Each year, three or four delegations were sent to the Chinese court, including about 20 official interpreters. Some of the most promising students were included, to give them immersive practice.

The study of Mongolian had originally been introduced when Goryeo was a vassal state of the Mongol Yuan dynasty. After the collapse of the Mongol empire, Joseon Korea had few dealings with the Mongols, but Mongolian language skills were retained as a strategic measure, in case the Mongols should again rise and threaten Korea.

Japanese and Jurchen became regular subjects in 1414 and 1426 respectively. Together, these were known as the 'four studies' (Sahak 四學), with Jurchen later being succeeded by Manchu. The Jianzhou Jurchen (the Manchus) invaded Korea in 1627 and 1637, before overthrowing the Ming in 1644 and establishing the Qing dynasty in China. From then on, the Manchu language (viewed by Koreans as a later form of Jurchen) was ranked next to Chinese by the Bureau.

== Interpreters ==
Local official interpreter schools and the route of official missions to China

The bureau was responsible for training interpreters, with about 100 students in the 15th century, increasing to over 200 in the 18th century, In addition, branch schools were established near the frontiers in the early 15th century:

- Instructors in Chinese were located in the main cities along the route to China: Hwangju, Pyongyang and Uiju.
- Instructors in Japanese were located in Busan and other southeastern ports.
- Instructors in Jurchen (later replaced by Manchu) were located in towns along the northern border: Uiju, Changsong, Pukchong, Pyoktong, Wiwon and Manpo.

A school was established on Jeju Island in 1671, teaching Chinese and Japanese. There were no local schools for Mongolian until the late 19th century, as there were no Korean contacts with the Mongols.

Language education at the bureau began at age 15 and took about three years. The bureau administered the interpreter's examination, one of the gwageo (civil service examinations). The examinations for the technical professions – interpretation, medicine, astronomy and law – were labelled "miscellaneous" and considered of lower status than the literary and military examinations. As with the other categories, regular examinations occurred every three years, but there were also special examinations to celebrate important events. The examination for each language began with a preliminary stage, from which the best performers advanced to a "re-examination" stage for final selection of a prescribed number of interpreters. Each stage consisted of two parts, a test (oral for Chinese, written for other languages) and a translation of part of the Joseon legal code (Gyeongguk daejeon). Local examinations were offered in Chinese only, in the three cities on the route to China.

The profession of interpreter was continually denigrated by officials of the dominant yangban class. Various kings, mindful of the need for skilled interpreters, sought to raise the status of the profession, both by encouraging yangban youths to become interpreters and by trying to elevate interpreters to yangban status. Both policies failed, but the supply of interpreters was maintained through regulations requiring provincial governors to supply talented youths for training. The social status of interpreters was eventually resolved through the formation of the chungin class for the technical professions in the 17th century, after which the profession was largely hereditary.

By the reign of Sukjong (1674–1720), the number of interpreters had increased to about 600, even though the government only employed 50 or 60 of them. To encourage qualified interpreters to stay in this strategically vital profession, the government shared each salaried post between several interpreters, using them in rotation, and also allowed interpreters to supplement their meagre official income with private trade within prescribed limits. Interpreters were also allowed to conduct trade on behalf of other government offices, and, in order to maintain good relations with China, the government subsidized them for the increasing bribes demanded by Qing officials. Many merchant interpreters amassed enormous wealth. One of the most lucrative businesses was as intermediaries between Qing China and Japan, which did not have diplomatic relations, and were unable to trade by sea due to Qing prohibitions. This business was lost in the 18th century, when Qing China and Japan established diplomatic relations and opened maritime trade. At around the same time, private merchants became dominant in the border trade with China, and the interpreters were gradually squeezed out of trade.

== Publications ==
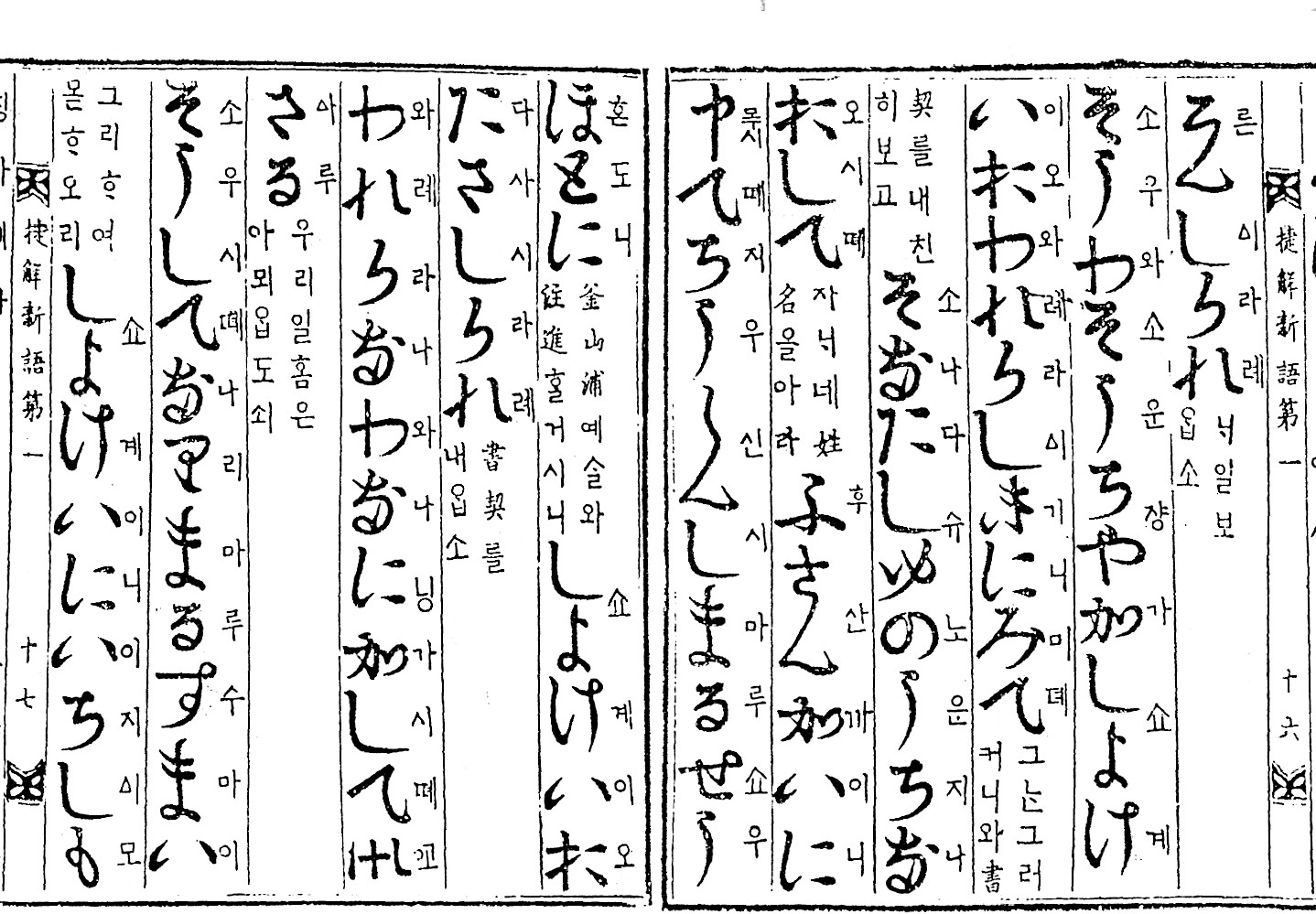
The Ch'ŏphae Sinŏ (1676), a textbook of Japanese

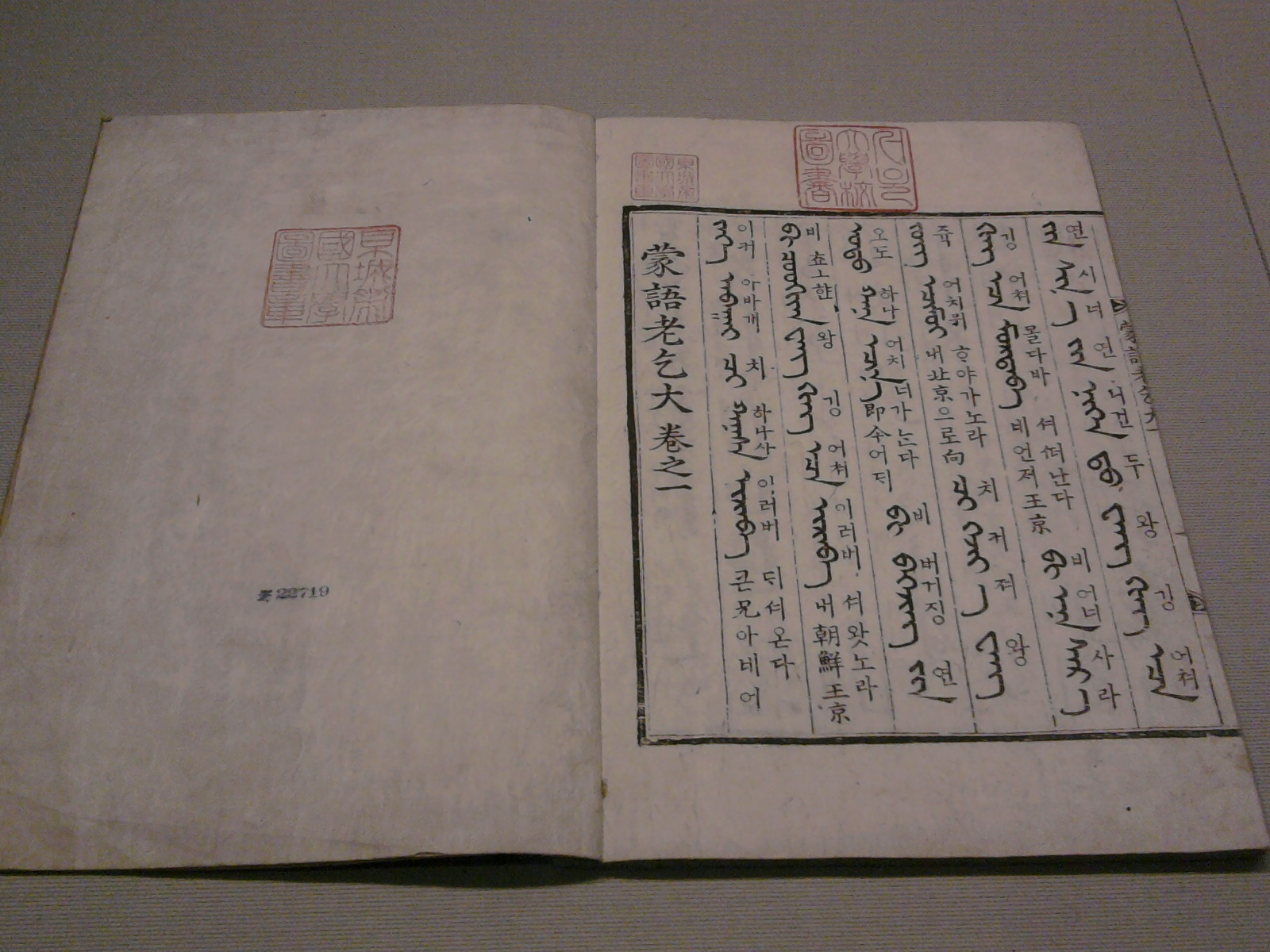
The Mongŏ nogŏltae, a Mongolian version of the Nogŏltae

The bureau produced a series of multilingual dictionaries, glossaries and textbooks. These works were repeatedly revised or replaced to keep up with changes in the target languages during five centuries. They are valuable sources on the history of Korean and the other four languages.

There was a glossary for each of the foreign languages: the Yŏgŏ yuhae (譯語類解) for Chinese, Mongŏ yuhae (蒙語類解) for Mongolian, Waeŏ yuhae (倭語類解) for Japanese, and Tongmun yuhae (同文類解) for Manchu. In addition, the Han Ch'ŏng mun'gam (漢清文鑑) was a glossary of Chinese, Korean and Manchu. The Pangŏn chipsŏk (方言集釋) covered Korean and all four of the foreign languages.

In choosing textbooks, the focus was on fluency in the spoken language. Where foreign works were used, vernacular literature or elementary school texts were preferred to scholarly literature written in formal language (usually Chinese). In other cases, new conversational texts were produced. Successful texts were translated into other languages. Early textbooks contained only a foreign text, but after the introduction of the Hangul alphabet in 1446, they were annotated with pronunciations in Hangul and glossed in colloquial Korean.

The prescribed textbooks for colloquial Chinese were the Nogŏltae ('Old Cathayan') and Pak T'ongsa ('Pak the interpreter'), both originally written in the 14th century. The Nogŏltae consists of dialogues focussed on Korean merchants travelling to China, while the Pak T'ongsa is a narrative text covering Chinese society and culture. They were annotated and revised many times over the centuries, including by Choe Sejin in the early 16th century. In these texts, each Chinese character was annotated with two pronunciations, a 'vulgar sound' on the right representing the contemporary Mandarin pronunciation, and a 'correct sound' on the right giving the pronunciation codified in Chinese rhyme dictionaries such as the Hóngwǔ Zhèngyùn (洪武正韻). The Kyŏngsŏ Chŏng'ŭm (經書正音) consists of several Chinese classics annotated with pronunciations but not translations. Students of Chinese were required to study these because interpreters sent to the Chinese court were likely to interact with high-ranking scholar-officials. The Oryun chŏnbi ŏnhae (伍倫全備諺解), based on the Ming drama Wǔlún Quánbèi by Qiu Jun (丘濬), was also used in the late 18th and early 19th centuries.

Documents mention several early textbooks of Japanese, but the only one to have survived is a 1492 printing of the Irop'a (named after the Iroha presentation of the Japanese syllabary, with which the work begins). For several others, it is possible to identify Japanese elementary school textbooks on which they were based. In 1676, all of these texts were discarded and replaced with the Ch'ŏphae Sinŏ ('Rapid Understanding of a New Language'). This book and its revisions remained the sole official Japanese text for the following two centuries.

More than 20 textbooks of Mongolian are mentioned in various regulations, but most have not survived. The two extant texts are 1790 editions of the Mongŏ Nogŏltae and Ch'ŏphae Mongŏ, Mongolian translations of the Nogŏltae and Ch'ŏphae Sinŏ respectively.

Jurchen textbooks are first mentioned in a regulation from 1469. They were presumably written in the Jurchen script, but none have survived in that form. Two of them, both stories about children, are preserved in Manchu revisions from 1777, the Soa-ron (小兒論, 'Discussions of the Child') and P'alse-a (八歳兒, 'Eight-year-old Boy'). More important Manchu texts were the Ch'ŏngŏ Nogŏltae (清語老乞大), a translation of the Nogŏltae, and the Samyŏk Ch'onghae (三譯總解), based on a Manchu translation of the Ming Romance of the Three Kingdoms.
