= Nogŏltae =

Old Korean textbook of colloquial northern Chinese

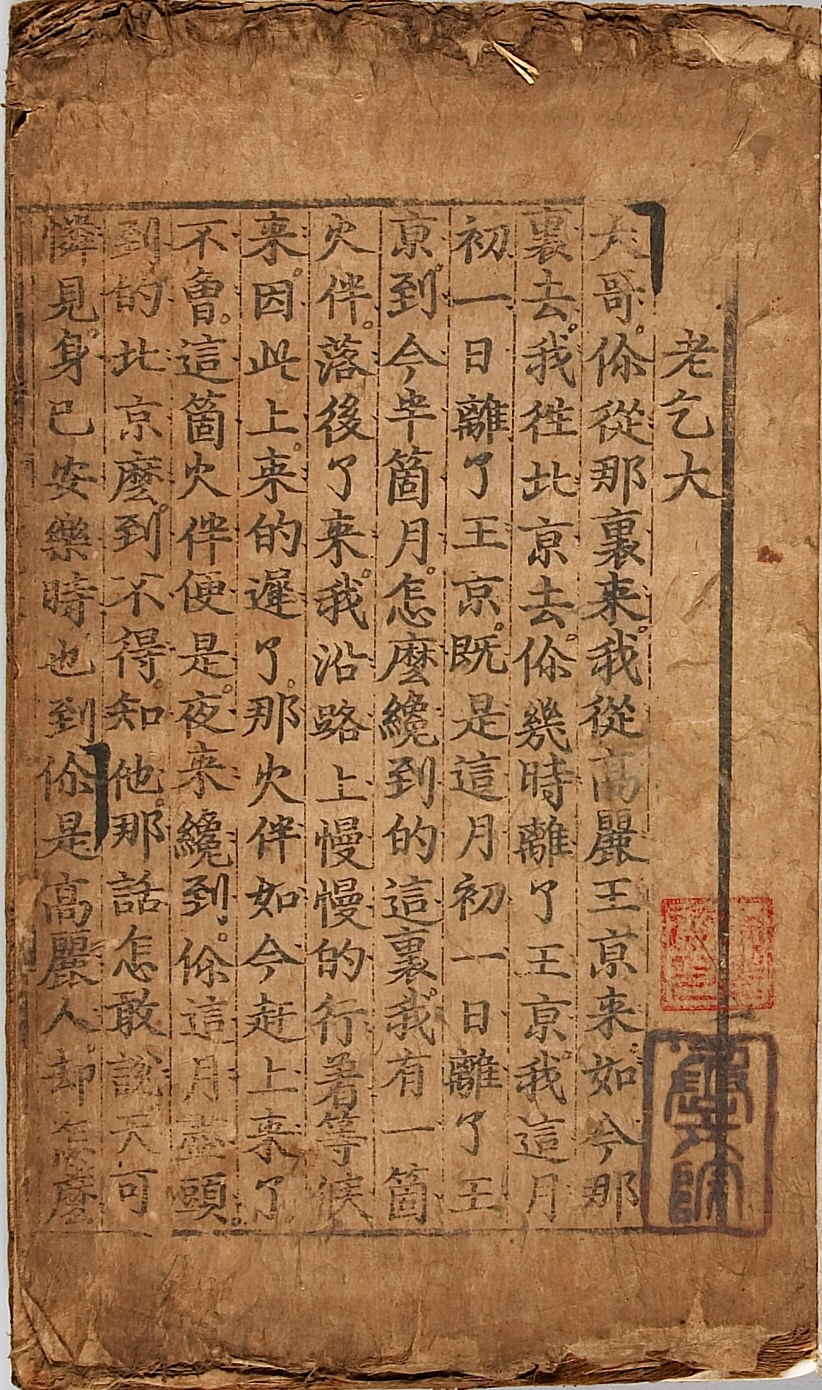
- First page of a 1670 printing of the Pŏnyŏk Nogŏltae

Korean name
- Hangul: 노걸대
- Hanja: 老乞大
Transcriptions
- Revised Romanization: Nogeoldae
- McCune–Reischauer: Nogŏltae

Chinese name
- Traditional Chinese: 老乞大
- Literal meaning: Old Cathayan
Transcriptions
Standard Mandarin
- Hanyu Pinyin: Lǎo Qǐdà
- Wade–Giles: Lao Ch'i-ta

The Nogŏltae ('Old Cathayan') is a textbook of colloquial northern Chinese published in Korea in several editions from the 14th to 18th centuries. The book is an important source on both Late Middle Korean and the history of Mandarin Chinese. Later editions were translated into Manchu and Mongolian.

== Contents ==
The word Qǐdà (Korean Kŏltae; Old Mandarin Khita) of the title, like the term Cathay, is a transcription of the Mongolian form of Khitan, a people who ruled northern China as the Liao dynasty (907–1125). It became a common name throughout Asia for China and all things Chinese. Here it means 'Chinese'. The word lǎo (老, Korean no, literally 'old') had been used as a prefix indicating familiarity (as in modern Standard Chinese) since at least the Tang period.

The book mainly consists of dialogs centered on a journey of a Korean merchant to Beijing, and the Chinese travelers who join him on the way. It opens with the following lines:

大哥你從那裏來	"Elder brother, where do you come from?"
我從高麗王京來	"I come from Wangjing in Korea." (Note: The city of Kaesong is here called Wangjing, the "Royal Capital" (王京, wang gyeong), as opposed to the Imperial Capital.)
如今那裏去	"Where are you going presently?"
我往北京去	"I am going to Beijing." (Note: In earlier versions of the text, Beijing is called by its Mongol name, Dadu.)

After arriving in Beijing, they sell Korean commodities and purchase goods to sell back in Korea. The book concludes with the Korean merchant's departure from Beijing.

The book focuses on language used in travel, business, banquets, and medicine. It also contains unique insights into life in Beijing, including the first instance of the word hutong (alley).

Later editions are accompanied by Korean-language annotation (諺解 ŏnhae) interleaved with the text. Below each Chinese character are written two transcriptions in Hangul: a "left reading" taken from the "popular readings" in Sin Sukchu's 1455 dictionary, and a "right reading" reflecting contemporary pronunciation. Each Chinese sentence is followed by a colloquial Korean translation, also written in Hangul.

== Editions ==
First page of the Chunggan Nogŏltae (1795)

Five editions of the book exist, as it was revised over the centuries to follow changes in the northern Chinese vernacular and the Korean language.

The original Chinese edition seems have been written around the middle of the 14th century. The Nogŏltae and a similar text, Pak t'ongsa ("Pak the interpreter"), were very popular, and are mentioned in Korean records of 1426 as required texts for government translators. An early 15th century copy discovered in Daegu in 1998 is believed to be close to the original version. It includes valuable information on the colloquial Old Mandarin of the Yuan dynasty, called "Han'er speech" (漢兒言語) in this book.

In 1480, the royal instructor ordered revisions of both textbooks to match the very different Middle Mandarin of the Ming dynasty. A Korean scholar, Ch'oe Sejin, wrote a guidebook based on this edition in 1507–17. This edition is now conventionally called the Pŏnyŏk Nogŏltae (飜譯老乞大 "New Translation of the 'Old Cathayan'") to distinguish it from the original. The Korean versions of the dialogs are written in a colloquial style, giving unique insight into Late Middle Korean.

A third edition, the Nogŏltae ŏnhae, was published in 1670 by the Bureau of Interpreters. It has the same Chinese text as the Pŏnyŏk Nogŏltae, but the right readings and translations were updated to contemporary Korean.

During the Qing dynasty, the Chinese text was revised again as the Nogŏltae sinsŏk (老乞大新釋 "New edition of the 'Old Cathayan'"), which was published in 1761. The revision is attributed to one Byeon Hon, who went to Beijing in 1760 with the official delegation. Among the revisions are changing the Chinese name of Korea from Gāolí (高麗; Korean Goryeo) to Cháoxiǎn (朝鮮; Korean Joseon). A corresponding revised commentary, the Nogŏltae sinsŏk ŏnhae, was published in 1763 but is no longer extant.

The Chunggan Nogŏltae (重刊老乞大 "Reprinted 'Old Cathayan'") appeared in 1795, with a corresponding commentary Chunggan Nogŏltae ŏnhae. Its Chinese text is less colloquial than the earlier versions.

== Translations ==
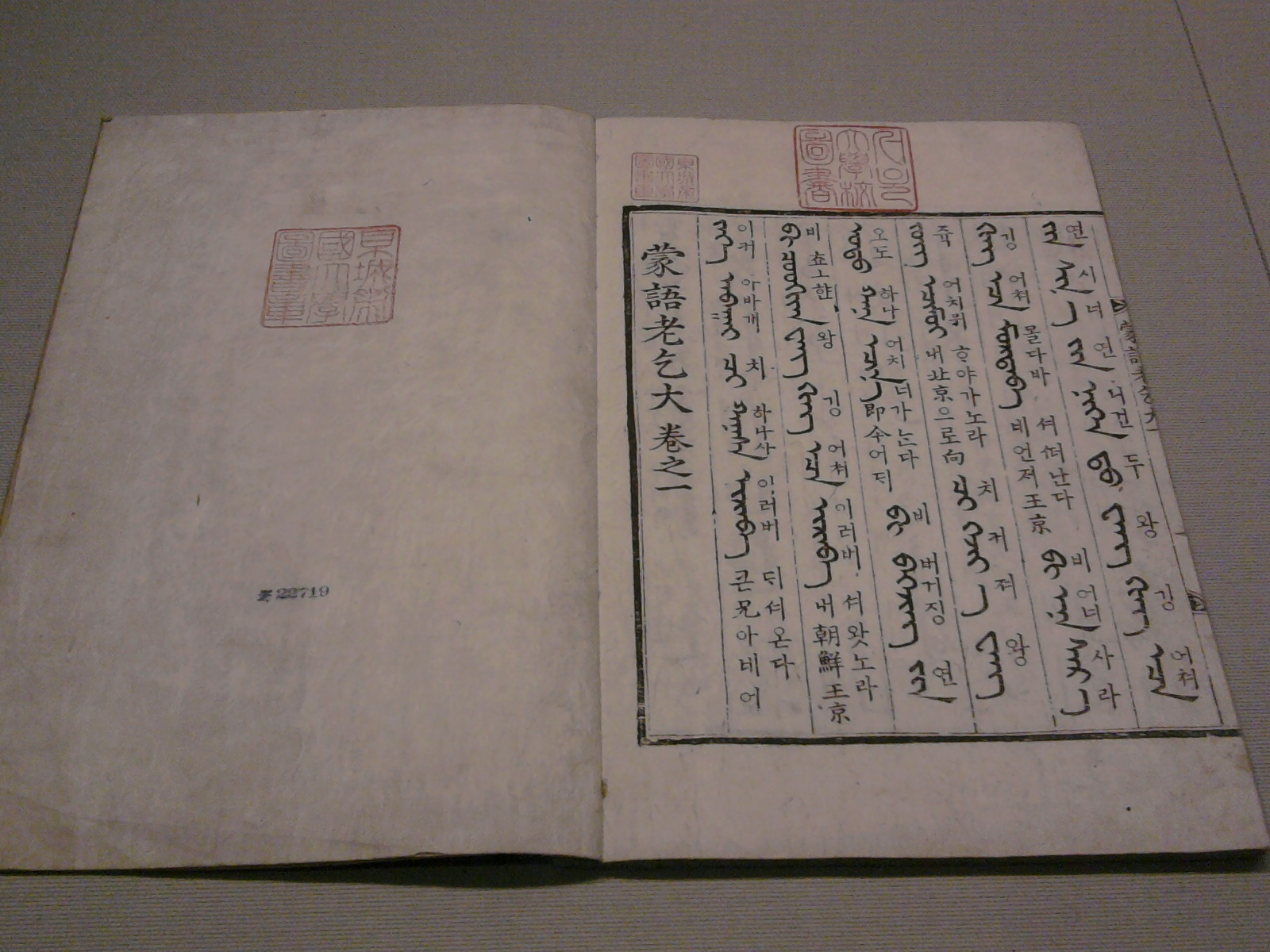
Mongolian edition

Translations of the Nogŏltae into other languages were also published by the Bureau of Interpreters. The Ch'ŏngŏ Nogŏltae (淸語老乞大 "Manchu 'Old Cathayan'") includes Manchu text along with Hangul pronunciation and Korean translations. It was written by Choe Hutaek (崔厚澤) and others and published in 1704 and revised in 1765. Yi Ch'oedae (이최대; 李最大) made a Mongolian edition called the Mongŏ Nogŏltae (蒙語老乞大 "Mongolian 'Old Cathayan'") that was published in 1741 and revised in 1766 and 1790. A textbook list included in an edict of 1669 mentions a Japanese translation, but it is no longer extant.

== See also ==
- Ch'ŏphae Sinŏ
