= Pak t'ongsa =

Old Korean textbook of colloquial northern Chinese

- Hangul: 박통사
- Hanja: 朴通事
- RR: Baktongsa
- MR: Pakt'ongsa

Pak t'ongsa (Chinese: 朴通事; lit. 'Pak the interpreter') is a textbook of colloquial northern Chinese published by the Bureau of Interpreters in Korea in various editions between the 14th and 18th centuries. Like the contemporaneous Nogŏltae ('Old Cathayan'), it is an important source on both Late Middle Korean and the history of Mandarin Chinese. The Nogŏltae consists of dialogues and focuses on travelling merchants, but Pak t'ongsa is a narrative text covering society and culture.

== Editions ==
The original Chinese text was written in the mid-14th century, but it is no longer extant. The Pak t'ongsa and the Nogŏltae were very popular, and are mentioned in Korean records of 1426 as required texts for government translators.

In 1480, the royal instructor ordered revisions of both textbooks to match the very different Middle Mandarin of the Ming dynasty. In 1517, the Korean scholar Ch'oe Sejin augmented this edition with Chinese pronunciations written in Hangul and a Korean translation. This edition is now conventionally called the Pŏnyŏk Pak t'ongsa (飜譯朴通事 New Translation of Pak the Interpreter) to distinguish it from the original. This edition was believed to have been lost during the Manchu invasions of Korea, but one volume was rediscovered in the 1950s. The Korean version is written in a colloquial style, giving unique insight into Late Middle Korean.

The Pak t'ongsa ŏnhae (朴通事諺解 Vernacular Exposition of Pak the Interpreter) was published in 1677. Prepared when the earlier Pŏnyŏk Pak t'ongsa was believed lost, this edition was based on Ch'oe Sejin's No Pak Jimnam (老朴集覽 Glossary of the No[gŏltae] and Pak [t'ongsa]). The Chinese text is identical with that of the Pŏnyŏk Pak t'ongsa, but the pronunciations and the Korean translation were completely revised.

Pak t'ongsa sinsŏk ŏnhae (朴通事新釋諺解 New Edition Vernacular Exposition of Pak the Interpreter), a further revision by Kim Chang-jo, was published in 1765.
