= Yongbiŏch'ŏn'ga =

15th century Joseon epic poem

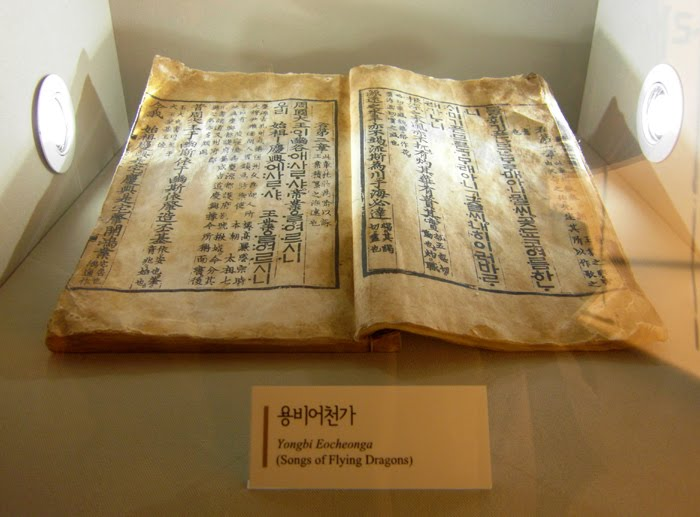
- Copy of Yongbiŏch'ŏn'ga displayed at the Sejong Story exhibition hall in Seoul

Korean name
- Hangul: 용비어천가
- Hanja: 龍飛御天歌
- RR: Yongbieocheonga
- MR: Yongbiŏch'ŏn'ga

Yongbiŏch'ŏn'ga (Korean: 용비어천가; Hanja: 龍飛御天歌; lit. 'Songs of the Dragons Flying to Heaven'), was the first work written in Hangul. The book was published in 1447 and written by Chŏng Inji, An Chi and Kwŏn Chae. The preface was written by Sŏng Sammun and Pak P'aengnyŏn.

The epic poem concerned the Joseon dynasty and Sejong's immediate predecessors, and was a justification of the dynasty change from Goryeo to Joseon. Today, the Songs provide insight into the development of Joseon, the Korean people, and the history of neighboring ethnicities in Northeast Asia such as the Jurchens (Manchus) who would later establish the Qing dynasty of China.

The songs, in the form of 125 cantos, were composed through the efforts of a committee of Confucian philologists and literati. This compilation was the first Korean writing to be recorded in hangul (in addition to hanja). Previously, Korea had a long history of recording texts using Chinese characters exclusively. Several important themes in addition to that of the establishment of the Joseon dynasty reflect the events that gave rise to the creation of these poems: historical events that took place in China, the apotheosis of virtuous Kings preceding the fall of the Goryeo dynasty in Korea, and the Confucian political and philosophical ideologies. On April 28, 2006, it was designated as Korean Treasure No. 1463.

== Historical background ==
In 1259, a peace treaty was signed between the Goryeo Wang family kings and the Mongol Empire, resulting in a one hundred-year period of political domination by the Mongol-led Yuan dynasty of China. The period saw the increasing influence of Confucianism alongside the traditions of Buddhism, which had been the national religion for nearly eight hundred years.

During this period, the Yuan ʼPhags-pa script was in use alongside Chinese characters as one of the official scripts of the Mongol empire and would ultimately be one of the influences for the Korean Hangul alphabet. Near the end of the Yuan dynasty, in 1362 the old Korean capital Kaesong was captured from the Red Turbans. In 1382, the Chinese and Koreans defeated Japanese pirates at Mt. Hwangsan.

In 1388, some Koreans allied with the Ming dynasty, with some Korean generals refusing to march to Liaodong Peninsula to capture Ming strongholds for the Yuan. The return of the Korean general, Yi Sŏnggye signalled the start of the political changes which would result in the founding of Joseon in 1392, with the assassination of Goryeo’s last minister Chŏng Mong-ju in 1392 and the exile of Goryeo's last king. The new dynasty was closely aligned with the Ming dynasty.

In 1418 during the Joseon era, Korea began to experience a significant shift in academics and Confucian philosophical ideologies. In 1420, the Academy of Worthies was established, and their scholars were primarily responsible for the further spread of Confucianism through Korea, the creation of hangul, and a number of literary works including the Songs of the Dragons Flying to Heaven.

== Implications of the Songs ==
The dragons spoken of in the title the Songs represent the six ancestors of the Joseon dynasty: Mokjo, Ikjo, Dojo, Hwanjo, Taejo, and Taejong. The flight of the dragons, Yongbiŏch'ŏn'ga is the Joseon dynasty's rise in accordance with the Chinese concept of "the Mandate of Heaven." This identifies the Joseon ancestry as morally and politically virtuous and also sets out an ideological foundation for future Joseon rulers to follow.

Original text in Middle Korean	Yale transliteration	Modern Korean	Translation by James Hoyt
뎨〯ᅀᅵ〯쟈ᇰ	Tyěyzǐcyàng	제2장	Canto II
불휘〮 기픈〮 남ᄀᆞᆫ〮	Pwùlhwúy kìphún nàmkón	뿌리 깊은 나무는	A tree with deep roots,
ᄇᆞᄅᆞ매〮 아니〮 뮐〯ᄊᆡ〮	Pòlòmáy àní mwǔylssǒy	바람에 흔들리지 아니하므로	Because the wind sways it not,
곶 됴〯코〮	Kwóc tyǒkwó	꽃 좋고	Blossoms Abundantly
여름〮 하〮ᄂᆞ니〮.	Yèlúm hánòní.	열매 많나니.	And bears fruit.
ᄉᆡ〯미〮 기픈〮 므〮른〮	Sǒymí kìphún múlún	샘이 깊은 물은	The water from a deep spring,
ᄀᆞ〮ᄆᆞ래〮 아니〮 그츨〮ᄊᆡ〮	Kómòláy àní gùchúlssóy	가뭄에도 그치지 아니하므로	Because a drought dries it not,
내〯히〮 이러〮	Nǎyhí ìlé	내를 이루어	Becomes a stream
바ᄅᆞ〮래〮 가〮ᄂᆞ니〮.	Pàlóláy kánòní.	바다에 가나니.	And flows to the sea.

== See also ==
- Hunmin jeongeum
- Korean literature
- Korean poetry
