= Hunmong chahoe =

1527 Korean educational book

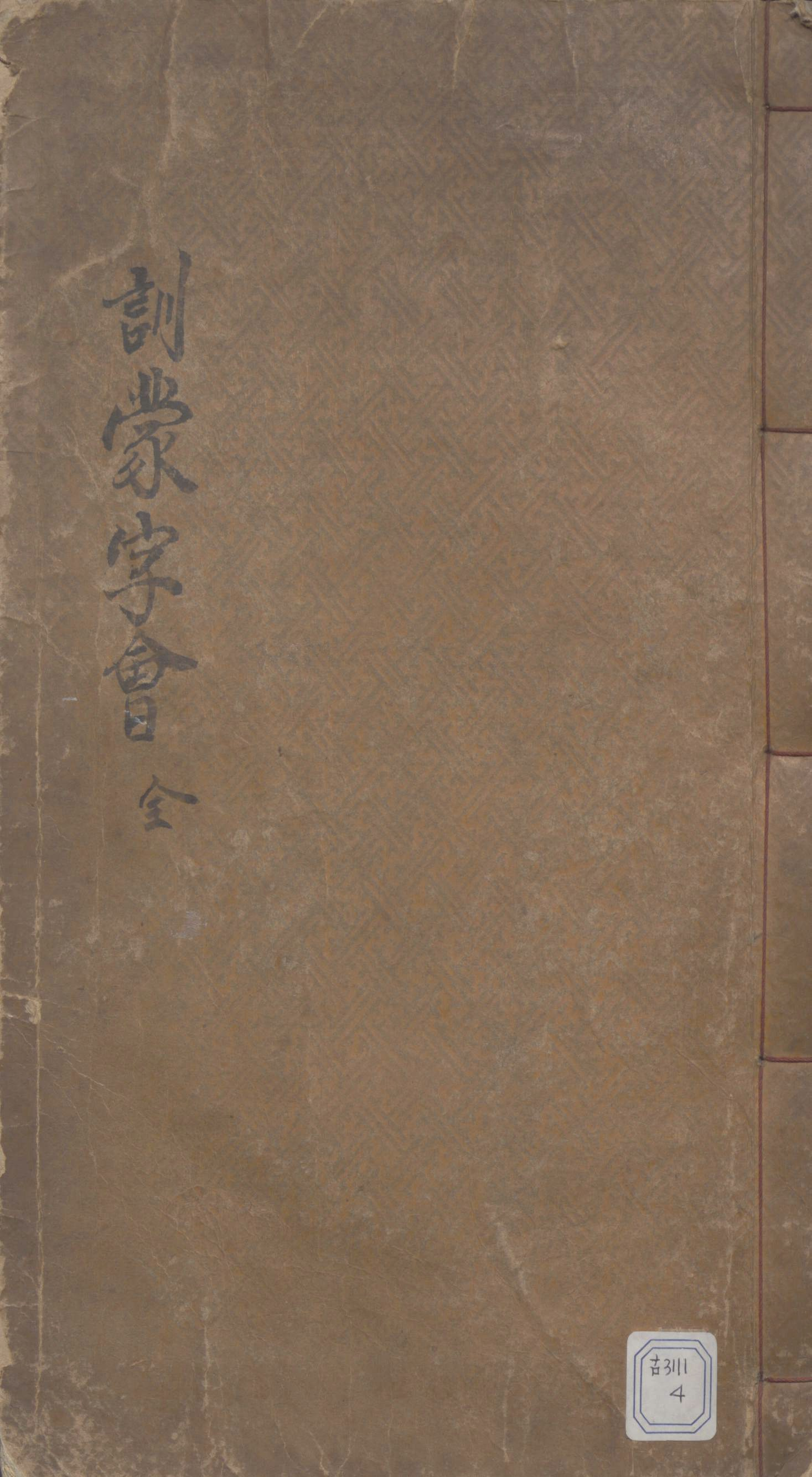
- Cover of a copy of the book
- Author: Ch'oe Sejin
- Publication date: 1527
- Original text: Hunmong chahoe at Korean Wikisource
- Translation: Hunmong chahoe at Wikisource

Korean name
- Hangul: 훈몽자회
- Hanja: 訓蒙字會
- RR: Hunmong jahoe
- MR: Hunmong chahoe

Hunmong chahoe (Korean: 훈몽자회; Hanja: 訓蒙字會) is an educational text published in 1527 by Korean linguist Ch'oe Sejin. The text was intended to help children learn Hanja: Chinese characters. It saw significant use for this purpose, and was reprinted numerous times, even into the early 20th century. It is considered to be of significant interest to modern linguistics and has had a lasting impact on the Korean alphabet Hangul.

== Description ==
A section at the end of the text, called Ŏnmun chamo (언문자모; 諺文字母), was an adaptation of the Hunminjeongeum meant to serve as a more practical guide for learning Hangul. Ahn evaluated it as a superior educational tool to the original, and argued that its structure made it a predecessor to the later panjŏl (반절; 反切) tables that became ubiquitous teaching tools for Hangul in the early modern period.

The text is considered to be of significant interest to modern linguists for a number of reasons. It is the earliest known direct attestation to names for the letters of Hangul; letter names in current use are based on the ones found here. However, it is unclear if Ch'oe coined the letter names himself. Many possibly incorrectly believe that Ch'oe coined the names. However, that is not clear from the text. Ch'oe states elsewhere in the work that his intent was to document current practice at the time. The order of Hangul letters found in this text form the basis of orders used today. In addition, the text documented actual pronunciations of the time instead of attempting to enforce artificial prescriptivist pronunciations, which aids linguists in trying to understand authentic contemporary phonology.

The oldest known copy of the text, produced in 1527, is held in Japan.
