= Ch'ŏphae sinŏ =

17th century Korean textbook for Japanese

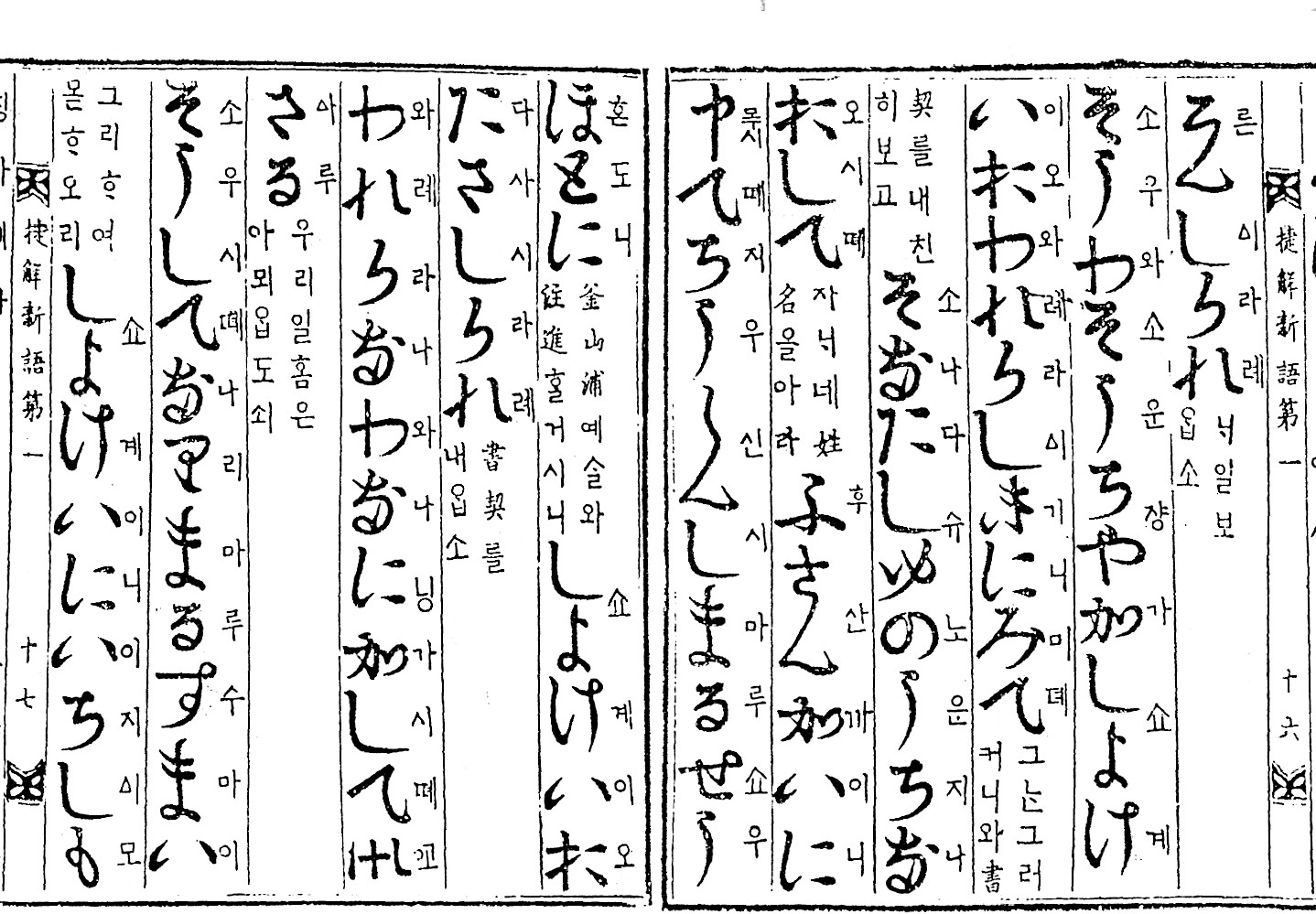
- Page of the original edition (1676)

Korean name
- Hangul: 첩해신어
- Hanja: 捷解新語
Transcriptions
- Revised Romanization: Cheophae sineo
- McCune–Reischauer: Ch'ŏphae sinŏ

Japanese name
- Kanji: 捷解新語
- Hiragana: しょうかいしんご
Transcriptions
- Romanization: Shōkai Shingo
- Kunrei-shiki: Syoukaisingo

Ch'ŏphae sinŏ (Korean: 첩해신어) or Shōkai Shingo (Japanese: 捷解新語; lit. 'Rapid Understanding of a New Language') is a Korean textbook of colloquial Japanese, written in 1618 and published by the Bureau of Interpreters in 1676. It is a source for Late Middle Japanese.

== Author ==
Kang Usŏng (Korean: 강우성, Japanese: 康遇聖, romanized: Kō Gūsē) was a native of Jinju in southeast Korea. At the age of 11, he was one of thousands of Korean civilians abducted to Japan during the Imjin War during the initial invasion in 1592. He was released after 10 years and returned to Korea, where he embarked on a career as an official interpreter, passing the interpreter's exam in 1609. He served as an interpreter at the Korean embassies in Japan and as an instructor in Busan, the departure point for missions to Japan.

By 1618, he had completed a series of instructional materials on the Japanese language in the form of conversations involving Koreans travelling to Japan for business or diplomacy.

== Editions ==
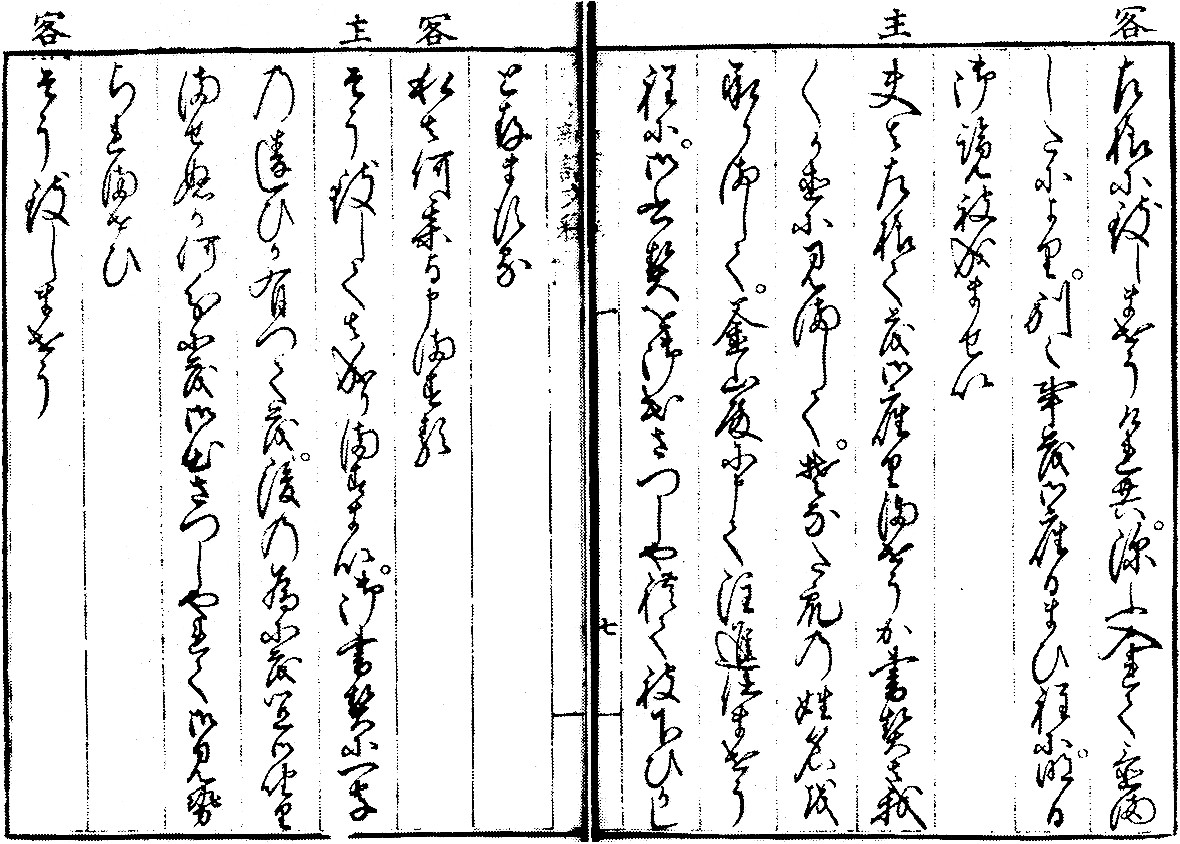
Page of the Ch'ŏphae sinŏ munsŏk (1796), using Japanese mixed script

The work was published in 10 fascicles in 1676, when it was adopted as the official textbook for teaching Japanese, replacing 14 out-dated titles. The Japanese text is written in large hiragana, with a phonetic transcription in Hangul on the right and followed by a translation in Korean mixed script. A copy of this edition is held by the Seoul National University Library. The book and its revisions remained the sole official Japanese text for the following two centuries.

A revised edition known as the Chungan (重刊 'reprinted') or Kaesu (改修 'revised') Ch'ŏphae sinŏ was published in 12 fascicles in 1781. It contains the same conversations and Korean translation as the original, but the Japanese text was updated to reflect the colloquial language of the time. Copies of this edition are held in the Seoul National University Library, the Tōyō Bunko and the Eihei Temple.

The preceding editions focussed on spoken Japanese, and so recorded the language using hiragana. The Ch'ŏphae sinŏ munsŏk (捷解新語文釋 'literary transformation of the Ch'ŏphae sinŏ'), published in 12 fascicles in 1796, was aimed at those who were also studying written Japanese. Intended as a companion to the preceding edition, it contained only the Japanese text, rewritten in the Japanese mixed script. The only known surviving copy of this edition is held in the Seoul National University Library.
