= Irop'a =

1492 Korean textbook on Japanese

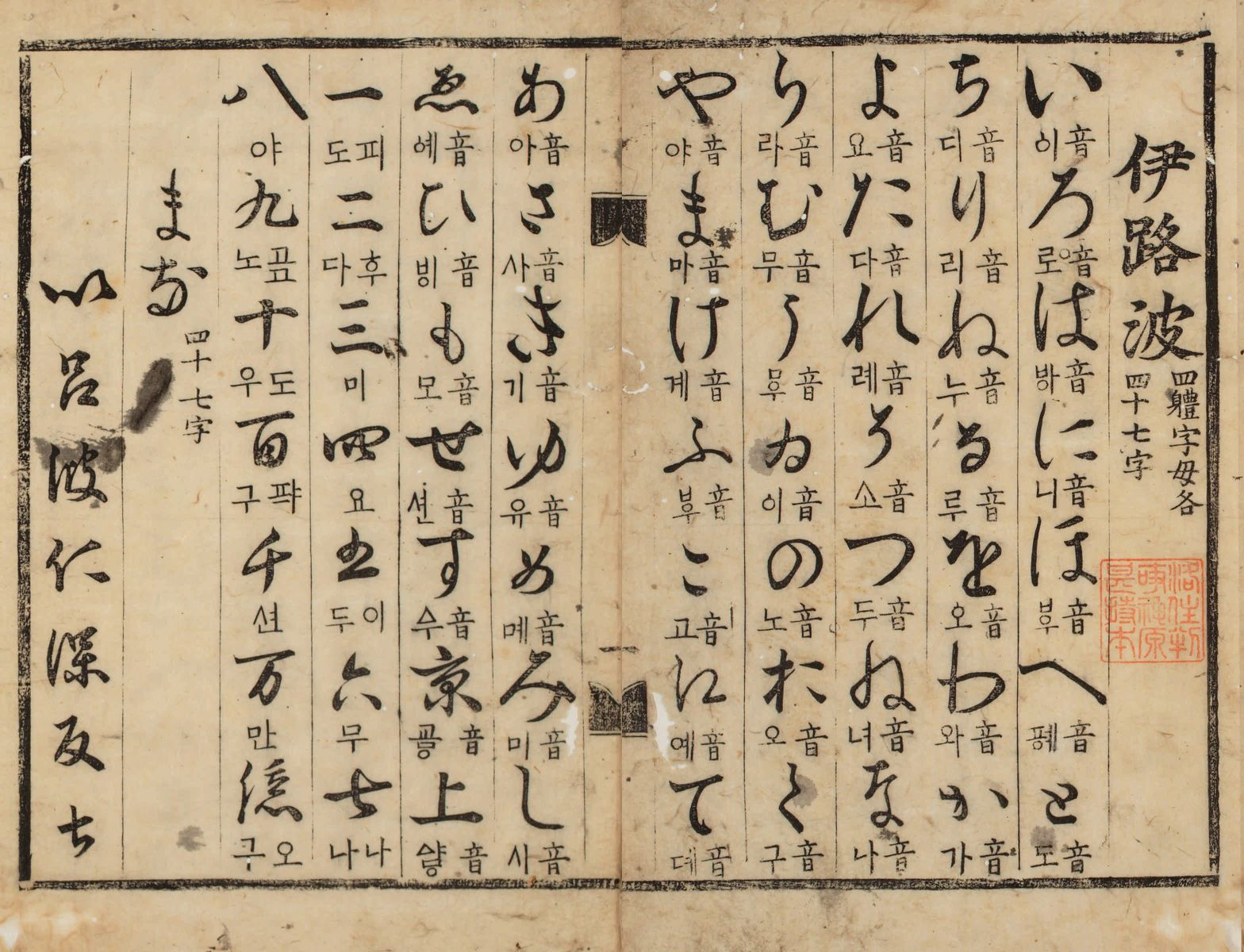

Korean name
- Hangul: 이로파
- Hanja: 伊路波
Transcriptions
- Revised Romanization: Iropa
- McCune–Reischauer: Irop'a

Japanese name
- Kanji: 伊路波
- Hiragana: いろは
Transcriptions
- Romanization: Iroha

The Irop'a (Korean: 이로파; Hanja: 伊路波) is a Korean textbook of the Japanese language published in 1492. It is a source on the phonology of Late Middle Japanese.

The Irop'a is named in official Korean lists of textbooks for Japanese dated 1430, 1469 and 1707. It was presumably revised after the introduction of the Hangul alphabet in 1446. Only one copy of the Irop'a is known today, an edition printed in 1492. This copy was in the collection of Kanbara Jinzō, president of Kagawa University, and first publicized in 1959. It is now held by the university library.

The work begins with four forms of the Japanese syllabary, each in the order of the Iroha poem: hiragana, two forms of mana (cursive Chinese characters), and katakana. Each hiragana syllable is accompanied by a transcription of its sound using Hangul.

Transcriptions of Japanese syllables in the Irop'a
	Japanese initial consonant									
Vowel	-	k	s	t	n	h	m	y	r	w
a	a	ka	sa	ta	na	fa (Note: These syllables were written using modified Hangul letters (with a circle below), which were introduced to represent the Chinese "light labial" initials.)	ma	ja	ɾa	wa
i	i	ki	si	ti	ni	fi	mi		ɾi	i
u	wu	ku	zu (Note: In the original poem, the syllables se and su occur together as one word, in which the middle consonant is pronounced voiced. In the transcription, a final /n/ is added to the first syllable and the initial of the second is rendered as /z/ to show that the middle consonant of the word was voiced, and possibly pre-nasalized.)	tu	nu	fu	mu	ju	ɾu	
e	jəj	kjəj	sjə(n)	tjə	njə	fʰjəj	mjəj		ɾjəj	jəj
o	o	ko	so	to	no	fu	mo	jo	ɾo	o

The hiragana syllabary is followed by Hangul transcriptions of 16 Japanese words, represented by Chinese characters: 京 'capital', 上 'above' and the numerals 1 to 10, 100, 1000, 10,000 and 100,000,000. The reasons for including the first two characters are unclear. Following the syllabaries is a brief summary of the Japanese writing system, written in Chinese. The bulk of the text is in Japanese without translation or annotation, consisting of model sentences and descriptions of Japanese people and customs.
