= Ch'oe Sejin =

Korean linguist (1465–1542)

- 최세진 (崔世珍)
- Born: 1465 (Seoul, Korea)
- Died: February 10, 1542 (aged 77) Seoul, Korea
- Occupations: Translator, interpreter, linguist
- Known for: Translation of Chinese texts; comparative studies of Korean and Chinese; naming and ordering of hangul characters
- Notable work: Hunmong chahoe

Korean name
- Hangul: 최세진
- Hanja: 崔世珍
- RR: Choe Sejin
- MR: Ch'oe Sejin

Courtesy name
- Hangul: 공서
- Hanja: 公瑞
- RR: Gongseo
- MR: Kongsŏ

Ch'oe Sejin (Korean: 최세진; Hanja: 崔世珍; Korean pronunciation: [t͡ɕʰwe sʰed͡ʑin]; 1465–1542) was a Korean linguist during the Joseon Dynasty as well as a noted translator and interpreter of the Chinese language. He was of the Goesan Choe clan and his courtesy name was Gongseo (공서; 公瑞).

Ch'oe is widely known for his research on the Korean hangul letters. His comparative studies of Chinese and Korean led to the propagation of hangul during a time when Chinese characters were used as the main system of writing. He devised the modern Korean order of the hangul characters, providing the earliest known attestation of the names to the letters. His most famous book on hangul is Hunmong chahoe (Collection of Characters for Training the Unenlightened, 1527).

Ch'oe was recognized not only for his works in hangul research but also for his talents as an official interpreter in the Korean Embassies in Beijing. However, his middle class status led to him being the target of many envious aristocrats of his era and he lived a tumultuous life.

Over the course of 40 years he composed 7 original works and published 10 translations and research works.

== Life and career ==
Ch'oe Sejin was born into a middle-class family in Seoul. His birth year is not found in any records but is estimated as being 1465, although there are claims that he was born in 1473. His father was Ch'oe Chungbal, also a translator and interpreter for the government.

Ch'oe junior passed the "Translating and Interpreting Government Exam" when he was 21 and when he was 38 he placed second in the "Bong Se Ja Byul Shi Exam", conducted to celebrate the crowning of the prince. He was known as a very skilled translator and interpreter, but his middle class status restricted his career and even led him into difficulties and hardships. At that time the Korean noble class organized society so that they controlled and possessed a majority of the wealth and property of the country, and it was common for them to be jealous of the rare cases where highly talented middle class government officials were promoted over nobles. Ch'oe became a target of the nobles' jealousy and was sacrificed in the factional strife and tumultuous political climate of the time.

Two months after he passed the "Bong Se Ja Byul Shi Exam" his acceptance was nullified because of his association with a trial for the murder of the deposed Queen Yoon. Even though Ch'oe was not directly involved in the trial, the Minister of Culture and Education, Lee Sejwa, was, and as Lee had conducted the exam – and personally recommended Ch'oe – Ch'oe's and all the other candidates' acceptances were nullified. Some successful candidates were able to retain their acceptance due to familial ties but Ch'oe was not one of them. After three years of waiting he was accused of writing an anonymous letter in 1507 criticizing the National Court and was subjected to a severe sentence, although he was saved from this accusation after more investigation. Two months after being cleared of the false accusations an unexpected opportunity arose, allowing him to receive his government rank back. An envoy from China was visiting the King of Joseon but there was no one appropriate and qualified to serve as the interpreter during the visit. Ch'oe was reluctantly appointed as the interpreter and completed the task successfully. The king recognized his talents and Ch'oe was able to then further his career as a translator, interpreter, and linguist.

Ch'oe's linguistic talent is recorded in the Jungjong of Joseon Chronicles, a chronological record of King Jungjong's historical reign from 1506 to 1544. A prime minister of the Joseon Dynasty, Yoo Soon, wrote that Ch'oe was "the best in the nation when it comes to Chinese writing and pronunciation", and that he was worried that there was no one to succeed Ch'oe in translating and responding to documents sent from China. So Yoo Soon wrote a petition to the king, asking him to pick six talented individuals to be instructed by Ch'oe in order to make sure that Ch'oe's legacy was maintained. The king also wrote about his concern that Ch'oe might be the only person capable of handling proper relations with China.

The available records about Ch'oe are very scarce. Scholars that belong to the Korean middle class rarely get recognized for their work and no historical records are ever kept of middle-class citizens. But despite his social class and the difficulties he faced during his lifetime the small historical record of him indicates that he was an influential figure in the history of the Korean language, particularly in his influence on Korean hangul, the education of Chinese characters, and the field of linguistics. In addition to his skills as a translator and interpreter he published a lot in the field of linguistics, especially in the realm of Chinese linguistics directed towards a Korean audience. He translated numerous works, including Bak Tongsa (Interpreter Park) – a Chinese textbook – and elaborated on it in his own work Sasung Tonghae (Explaining the Four Sounds).

He died on February 10, 1542 at the age of 77.

== Hunmong chahoe – book by Ch'oe ==
The cover of Hunmong chahoe

Ch'oe is best known for his 1527 work Hunmong chahoe, a textbook for children to learn Chinese characters which is very practical in its teachings.

During the Joseon Era, literacy in Chinese was an essential skill for advancement in society as it was then the dominant language of literature, and so children were taught Chinese from an early age to prepare for the future. Although the Korean orthography of hangul existed by this time it was not widely used in Korea, and Ch'oe wanted to promote its usage through his work Hunmong chahoe. Ostensibly a textbook for children to learn Chinese, the Chinese characters were annotated in hangul, and so in order for a reader to understand and learn the Chinese characters they must first have a full grasp of hangul so as to be able to comprehend the annotations. Ch'oe thought that this would encourage people to take the time to fully learn hangul before starting to learn Chinese, and thereby use hangul more extensively. He wrote that, "it would take [only a single day] to learn Hangul" because of its simplicity, and that a student would be able to learn Chinese on their own without an instructor if they knew hangul and utilized his textbook.

Ch'oe's book was considered at the time as revolutionary for its practicality and creativity. The two widely used works for learning Chinese characters during his time were Thousand Character Classic and Yoo Hap. Thousand Character Classic was considered very tedious and contained words that were conceptual and not suitable for daily use, while Yoo Hap was thought to be not suitable for daily instruction. In Hunmong chahoe, Ch'oe attempted to both supplement these weaknesses and combine their strengths with his book's breadth of content. Thousand Character Classic contained 1,000 characters, whereas Hunmong chahoe contained 3,360 characters and also grouped Chinese characters with similar meanings together to ease the process of learning.

As one of the phoneticians in the history of the Joseon Dynasty, Ch'oe also compiled the order of the Korean letters in Hunmong chahoe. The first eight characters in the order that is presented in this work are characterized as sounds that are "used for both the initial and the final sounds". The next set of eight characters are described as "those used only for the initial sounds". The eight characters that occur initially are then ordered as follows: "Molar [kh], the Tongue [th], the Lip [ph], the Tooth [c ch], the Half Tooth [z], and the Throat [0]". Only the order of these eight characters has been retained until the present, with the order of the other characters proposed by Ch'oe having been altered for unidentifiable reasons. Ch'oe also ordered the vowels in hangul according to the sequence in which we open our mouth to articulate these vowels, and that is the order that is used in present-day Korea.

Hunmong chahoe has been republished 10 times in the over 400 years since it first appeared, and was the most reproduced Chinese textbook of the Joseon Era. It was also widely used in Japan.

== Ch'oedongjisejinman – poem about Ch'oe ==
After Ch'oe's death in 1542 a scholar and friend named Kim An Gook dedicated a poem called "Ch'oedongjisejinman" (최동지세진만; 崔同知世珍挽) to Ch'oe, and it provides one of the best sources of details about his life – including his character and influence – as seen through the eyes of his friend Kim. The poem reads as follows:

Original (Chinese characters)	Korean translation	English translation
逆旅浮生七十翁 親知凋落奇孤躬 登名四紀機更變 餘榜三人又失功 爲命自今誰共討 輯書裨後世推功 嗟吾後死終無益 淚泗東風慟不窮	잠깐 다녀가는 뜬구름 같은 인생 70 노인이 친한 이 모두 사라진 채 혼자 남아 있구나 과거급제해 이름을 올린 지도 40년, 그동안 변을 당한 이 몇이던가 셋 남은 동기 중 또 그대를 잃었으니 이제 사대외교 문서를 지을 때 누구와 토론하리오 책을 지은 그대는 후세에 도움 줄 공을 남겼구려 슬프구나, 나는 죽은 뒤 아무런 이익을 남기지 않았다 눈물을 동풍에 뿌리며 소리내어 울기를 그칠 수 없구나	A man, who lived 70 years of a fleeting life, lies here alone, having seen the death of many of his loved ones. How many times has he gone through unlucky hardships during the 40 years after passing the examinations? I lost another friend out of the three that are left, so, who will I now discuss and debate with when composing diplomatic documents? You have done a great service to the future, leaving a great number of works. I am filled with sorrow; I will not leave any works after I die. I cannot stop my tears from flying out with the east wind, and stop from sobbing in anguish.

This poem is one of the best known in Korean linguistics because there is a lot of information about Ch'oe packed into it. Firstly it reflects Kim Ankook's sorrow upon his friend Ch'oe's death, and how Ch'oe went through a lot of hardships during the 40 years he served as a government official. However, he eventually lived a long life, "having seen the death of many of his loved ones". The line, "who will I discuss and debate with when composing diplomat documents" indicates that he was an important figure in international diplomacy, especially with respect to translation and interpretation. Lastly, Kim notes that his accomplishments will last far into the future since his works are considered "a great service to the future", thereby highlighting Ch'oe's long-lasting influence in the field of Korean linguistics.

== Other notable works ==
In addition to Hunmong chahoe, Ch'oe also wrote a further 17 research publications over the course of 40 years. Some of his most notable works are:

- Sasŏng t'onghae (사성통해; 1517): Marks the intonations and the correct pronunciations of Chinese characters in hangul. It also includes records of 450 Korean words in hangul and is an important source for research on the history of the Korean language.
- Sohak p'yŏnmong (소학편몽; 1537): A textbook for Chinese language learners, dedicated to the king.
- Unhoe okp'yŏn (운회옥편; 1537): Supplementary material to Sasung Tonghae.
- Yŏhyogyŏng (여효경; 1541): One of his last works, written when he was 76.
- Kyŏngsŏngji (경성지; 1541): A work about Nanjing city in China, one of his last works before he died.

== See also ==
- History of Korea
- Joseon Dynasty
