= Lee Hee-seung =

South Korean writer (1896–1989)

- Hangul: 이희승
- Hanja: 李熙昇
- RR: I Huiseung
- MR: I Hŭisŭng

Art name
- Hangul: 일석
- Hanja: 一石
- RR: Ilseok
- MR: Ilsŏk

Lee Hee-seung (Korean: 이희승, June 9, 1896 – November 27, 1989) was a Korean linguist, poet, and essayist. His courtesy name was Seongse (聖世); his pen name was Ilseok (一石).

== History ==
Born in Poil-ri, Uigok-myeon, Gwangju-gun, Joseon (now Poil-dong, Uiwang, South Korea), he passed through Gaepung-gun and spent his early childhood in Siheung-gun. While working with the Korean Language Society, he was imprisoned in 1942 for the Korean Language Society Incident, an incident in which the Japanese government suppressed the members of the Korean Language Society through torture and imprisonment, and he also recalled the experience of being tortured. After liberation, he worked as a professor at Seoul National University, wrote Korean linguistics, and compiled a Korean dictionary.

In particular, Lee Hee-seung's Korean grammatical system, together with Choi Hyeon-bae's grammatical system, formed an important basis for the description of Korean linguistic grammar. Additionally, his 《Korean Language Dictionary, (257,854 words) published in 1961, is considered a great achievement of the Korean language .

For 20 years from 1968, he contributed to the honoring of Dangun as the chairman of the Hyeonjeonghoe, and as the chairman of the Korean Language Education Research Association for 19 years from 1969, while striving for the right direction and correction of language education, he was inaugurated as the director of the Institute of Oriental Studies at Dankook University, compiled a dictionary of Korean and Korean history, and served as chairman of the Hyeonjeonghoe and advisor to the Liberation Society.

== Early life ==
Born the eldest son of Lee Jong-shik in Poil-ri, Uigok-myeon (now Uiwang), Gwangju-gun, Gyeonggi Province, Hee-seung Lee spent his childhood in Gaepung-gun, Gyeonggi Province and Siheung-gun, Gyeonggi Province. From 1903 to 1908, he studied Chinese literature at a private school.

In 1908, the year he turned 13, he married Lee Jeong-ok of the Lee family in Gyeongju, and moved to Seoul, entering the English Department of the Hanseong Foreign Language School.

=== Adolescence and studies ===
He then studied at Gyeongseong High School (now Gyeonggi High School) until September 1911, but he dropped out of Gyeongseong High School in protest of the Japanese compulsion and majored in law at Yangjeonguisuk (養正義塾) from 1912 to 1913.

In 1914, he became a teacher at the private Sinpung School, but Lee Hee-seung continued his education at the private Jung-dong School in the evening in 1915, and then graduated from the 4th year of the private central school in 1918.

In the same year, he started working as a clerk at Gyeongseong Textile Co., Ltd.

=== Language Studies ===
In 1923, he passed the entrance exam for a vocational school again, graduated from Yonhee College in 1925, and then in 1927, he completed the preparatory course at Keijō Imperial University and graduated.

In the same year, he joined the Korean Language Society and served as secretary (director) and secretary general (representative secretary), and the 'Korean Spelling Unification Plan' (completed in 1933) and 'Standard Language Assessment' (completed in 1937) were promoted by the society.[2]

== After the Japanese defeat in the Pacific ==
For 20 years from 1968, he contributed to the honoring of Dangun as the chairman of the Hyeonjeonghoe, and for 19 years from 1969, as the chairman of the Korean Language Education Research Association, he participated in the correction of language education, such as advocating the mixed use of Korean and Korean texts.

In February 1955, he participated as one of the founders of the Inchon Kim Seong-soo Memorial Association. From 1971 to 1981, while serving as the director of the Institute of Oriental Studies affiliated with Dankook University, he contributed to the development of Korean Studies and Oriental Studies, by, for example, compiling a Korean-Korean Dictionary (recorded as the world's largest Chinese character dictionary).

Lee Hee-seung, who lived as a saennim (scholar) in Namsangol, said in his essay, 'Clicker', "Winter is here, so there is no way there will be firewood. The whole body straightens so that the legs and arms make a crackling sound, the limbs crouch down as they should, and the words that he says while grinding his teeth clenched hard as he struggles, "You bastard, you seem like such a disgusting cold, so you're like this now. Don't rush, let's see next spring somewhere."

With his scholarly spirit, after the 5/16 military coup, he refused military rule when he was president of the Dong-A Ilbo, and under the Yushin constitution, he resolutely stood up against dictatorship as an advisor to the National Assembly for the Restoration of Democracy: "I was able to take pride in my life that I had walked the right path as others acknowledged."

He died on November 27, 1989, at the age of 94, and is buried in Seonyeong, Munbong-ri, Byeokje-myeon, Goyang-gun, Gyeonggi-do (now Munbong-dong, Ilsandong District, Goyang).

== Korean linguistics research ==
《Joseon Linguistics Review》(published in 1947), selected and included only 16 of the 20 or so papers published from 1930 to 1940. The Introduction to Korean Linguistics is regarded as a masterpiece that presented the direction of Korean linguistics research in Korea. However, Lee Hee-seung's theory on grammar is dominated by Choi Hyun-bae 's grammar, and the data that appeared in a large amount of grammar theory lecture materials at universities are not available for public use.

A Study on Korean Grammar: The conjugation endings of verbs were not recognized as independent parts of speech, but various acrostic endings combined with verbs were recognized as an independent unit and called 'postpositions', and the linguistic form in which postpositions were combined with verbs was 'words' (語).節)', and the unit of parts of speech is a word, and the unit of writing is a word.

Parts of speech are nouns, pronouns, verbs, adjectives, beings, adjectives, adverbs, exclamations, conjunctions, and postpositional expressions, and the designating pronoun 'is' was treated as a predicate case particle, which is the use of the body language.

This grammatical system of Lee Hee-seung, along with Choi Hyun-bae's grammatical system, formed two major series of linguistic grammatical systems in Korea. In addition to grammatical theory, he paid great attention to words and vocabulary, and his 《Korean Language Dictionary》 (257,854 words, published in 1961) is considered a great achievement of the Korean language.

=== Textbook compilation project ===
As a textbook, Elementary Korean Grammar (《초급국어문법》; 1949) and New Higher Grammar (《새고등문법》; 1957), which supplemented it, were published. The area of grammar was presented in three parts: general discourse, parts of speech, and writing. In In our language (《우리말본》; 1937) by Choi Hyeon-bae, the areas of grammar were Sorigal (音聲學), Ssigall (詞論), and (Writing) Wolgal (文章).

=== Establishment of Ilseok Korean Linguistics Award ===
After graduating from the Department of Korean Language and Literature at Gyeongseong Imperial University, Ilseok, who taught at Ewha Women's Jeon, was arrested in 1942 for the Joseon Language Society Incident and served three years in prison until Japan was defeated.

After liberation, he became a professor at Seoul National University's Munri University, and together with Choi Hyeon-bae (at Yonsei University), they became the major scholars of Korean language.

Ilseok established the theoretical basis for the unification of orthography, established a Korean grammar system, and compiled a dictionary of the Korean language.

Ilseok left behind collections of essays Dumb cold heart (벙어리 냉가슴), Blind man's sleep talking (소경의 잠꼬대), Meddling in the words of an eating chu (먹추의 말참견), and the poetry collections Park Flower (박꽃) and Fragments of the Heart (심장의 파편).

His will made provision for the Ilseok Korean Linguistics Award (awarded since 2003), and in 2002, a 6-story Ilseok Academic Foundation building was erected on the site of Ilseok's home in Dongsung-dong, Jongno District, Seoul.

== Annals ==
- 1971 Inaugurated as Director of Oriental Studies Research Center at Dankook University
- 1968 Vice President of Academy of Sciences elected
- 1969 Inaugurated as chair professor and dean of graduate school at Sungkyunkwan University
- 1965 Inaugurated as Dean of Graduate School of Daegu University
- 1963 Inaugurated as president of Dong-A Ilbo
- 1962 Honorary professor at Seoul National University
- Retired from Seoul National University in 1961
- 1957 Inaugurated as dean of the College of Liberal Arts and Sciences, Seoul National University
- 1954 Lifetime member of the Korean Academy of Sciences
- 1952 Appointed Vice President of Seoul National University Graduate School
- 1945 Inaugurated as a professor at the College of Liberal Arts and Sciences, Seoul National University
- 1932 Appointed secretary of the Joseon Language Society and director of the Korean Language Society
- 1932 Inaugurated as a professor at Ewha Women's College
- 1930 Participated in the drafting of the Korean spelling unification plan and the foreign language transcription law
- Member of the Korean Language Society in 1930

=== Education ===
- Graduated from private school in Gwangju, Gyeonggi-do
- Transferred from Department of English at Hanseong Foreign Language School
- Gyeongseong High School Completion
- Gyeongseong Yangjeong High School Completion
- Gyeongseong Jungdong High School Completion
- Dropped out of Gyeongseong Jungang High School
- Graduated from Gyeongseong YMCA English School
- Gyeongseong Yeonhee College, Department of Mathematical Science, Bachelor of Science
- Bachelor of Korean Language at Gyeongseong Imperial University
- Master of Humanities, Department of Linguistics, Graduate School, Tokyo Imperial University, Japan
- Doctor of Literature, Department of Korean Language and Literature, Graduate School, Seoul National University

=== Awards ===
- 1957 Academic Achievement Award
- 1960 Seoul Educational Achievement Award
- 1962 National Order of Merit, Independence Medal
- 1962 Academic Achievement Award
- 1978 Inchon Cultural Award
- Upon his death in 1989, he was awarded the National Mugunghwa Medal

=== Books ===
- 1996 The Life of a Seonbi with Disappearance
- 1975 Eater's Interfering with Horses
- 1962 Blind Man's Sleep Talk
- 1961 Poetry 'Fragments of the Heart'
- 1956 Dumb cold heart
- 1947 Poetry collection 'Park Flower'

=== See also ===
- 이희승 Lee Heeseung:Korean language, Korean language arrangement movement and establishment of spelling. terms.naver.com (in Korean).
- 이희승 Lee Hee-seung. terms.naver.com (in Korean).
- Noh Cheonmyeong
- Lee Byeonggi
- Choi Hyunbae
