= Kim Yun-kyong =

Korean linguist and educator

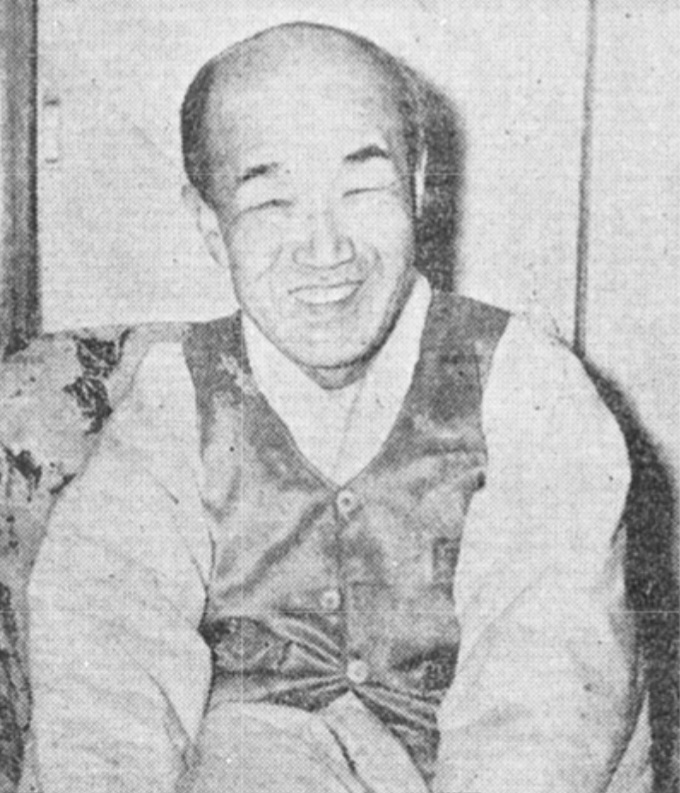
- Kim Yun-kyong
- Born: June 9, 1894; Gyeonggi Province, Joseon
- Died: February 3, 1969; Busan, South Korea
- Education: Yonsei University (B.A.), Rikkyo University (B.A.)
- Occupation(s): linguist, educator
- Notable work: Joseon Script and History of Joseon Linguistics (조선문자 급 어학사/朝鮮文字及語學史, 1938), Korean Language Grammar (나라말본, 1948), and Middle School Korean Language Grammar (중등말본, 1948)

Korean name
- Hangul: 김윤경
- Hanja: 金允經
- RR: Gim Yungyeong
- MR: Kim Yun'gyŏng

Art name
- Hangul: 한결
- RR: Hangyeol
- MR: Han'gyŏl

Kim Yun-kyong (Korean: 김윤경; Hanja: 金允經; Korean pronunciation: [kim.jun.gjʌŋ]; June 9, 1894 – February 3, 1969) was a Korean linguist and educator, renowned for his works such as Joseon Script and History of Joseon Linguistics (조선문자 급 어학사; 朝鮮文字及語學史, 1938), Korean Language Grammar (나라말본, 1948), and Middle School Korean Language Grammar (중등말본, 1948). Kim was an activist for the Korean language movement and attempted to preserve the Korean writing system during the Japanese colonial period. In recognition of his efforts to safeguard the Korean language and promote national consciousness, he was posthumously awarded the National Foundation Medal in 1977 and the Patriotic Medal of the Order of Merit for National Foundation in 1990.

== Biography ==
=== Early life ===
Kim Yun-kyong was born in Gojam-ri (고잠리), Opo-myeon, Gwangju County, Gyeonggi Province, Joseon on June 9, 1894, as the eldest son of Jeong-min Kim (김정민; 金正民) and Rak-hyul Park (박락휼; 朴樂恤). He studied Chinese literature in his hometown from the age of five to fifteen and moved to Seoul in April 1908 to pursue modern education. He then enrolled at the Private Woosan School (사립우산학교; 私立牛山學校) located in western Seoul. In December of the same year, he transferred to Virtuous Law School (의법학교; 懿法學校), from which he graduated on July 9, 1909, and immediately entered its advanced program (고등과) in the following September. He completed this program in 1910, a year marked by the Japan–Korea Annexation (한일합병; 韓日倂合). Subsequently, in January 1911, he enrolled at the Private Youth Academy (사립청년학원; 私立靑年學院) in Sangdong (상동), southern Seoul, where he received Hangul instruction from his lifelong mentor, Si-gyeong Ju. Influenced by Ju's teachings on the excellence of the Korean alphabet, Kim's prejudices and conventional views about Hangul were completely transformed. Although initially interested in mathematics, he eventually chose to dedicate his life to the study of the Korean language.

=== Mid-life ===
In the spring of 1913, after graduating from the Private Youth Academy, Kim began teaching Korean, history, and mathematics in the advanced program at Changsin School (창신학교; 昌信學校) in Masan. He lectured there for four years, during which he authored his early scholarly work, a paper titled The Basis of Joseon Language Research (조선어 연구의 기초).

In April 1917, he enrolled in the liberal arts program at Yonhi College (now Yonsei University). There, he emerged as a leading figure in student movements, serving as the chairman of the Joseon Student Conference (조선학생대회; 朝鮮學生大會), an organization of 1,000 students from general high schools (보통고등학교) and colleges in Seoul advocating for friendship and unity among Korean students. After participating in the March First Movement in 1919, a nationwide anti-Japanese resistance movement, he took a gap year and stayed in the countryside to evade arrest.

Upon his return to school, he took an active role in studying and advancing Hangul. On December 3, 1921, he founded the Joseon Language Research Institute (조선어연구회; 朝鮮語硏究會), together with fellow researchers Tu-son Choi (최두선), Ji-yeong Jang (장지영), Deok-gyu Kwon (권덕규), and Byeong-gi Lee (이병기). This institute played a central role in researching and promoting Hangul during the Japanese colonial period. By January 1922, Kim drafted a paper titled On Correcting Our Language and Script by Observing Their Past and Present Forms (우리말과 글의 예와 이제를 보아 바로잡을 것을 말함). The following month, he joined the Self-Cultivation Friendship Association (수양동우회), organized by Chang-ho Ahn (안창호).

Kim graduated from Yonhi College on March 24, 1922, and taught Korean and history at Paiwha Girls' General High School (배화여자고등보통학교; 培花女子高等普通學校) until 1926. After receiving a scholarship from Paiwha in the same year, he furthered his studies at Rikkyo University's Department of History in Japan. He completed his thesis, A Historical Examination of Joseon Script (조선 문자의 역사적 고찰), on September 17, 1928, and earned a bachelor's degree in East Asian history in 1929 at the age of 36. Starting in 1934, he expanded on his thesis, eventually publishing Joseon Script and History of Joseon Linguistics (조선문자 급 어학사; 朝鮮文字及語學史) in 1938. After graduating from Rikkyo University, Kim returned to teach at Paiwha Girls' General High School and was actively involved in the Joseon Language Research Institute. He also devoted himself to nationwide Hangul education (see "Career: Before Korean liberation").

=== Later life and death ===
As the Japanese fascist regime intensified, Kim suffered significantly due to the Self-Cultivation Friendship Association incident (수양동우회사건; 修養同友會事件) in 1937. Perceived by the Japanese authorities as a rebellious group, the association saw 181 of its members arrested under the Peace Preservation Law (치안유지법), with 31 eventually indicted. All were released by November 1941. During this period, Kim was arrested, tortured, and lost his job amid the trials that spanned from the first to the third court hearings. Even after his release, he suffered from aftereffects of torture, including becoming deaf in one ear.

He was acquitted by the high court in October 1941 and began working as a teacher at Sungshin Girls' School of Home Economics (성신가정여학교; 誠信家政女學校) in April 1942. However, in October of the same year, he was arrested again along with fellow Hangul scholars Ji-yeong Jang, Deok-gyu Kwon, and Byeong-gi Lee, during the Joseon Language Society incident (Joseon Language Research Institute was renamed Joseon Language Society in 1931)—a strategic move by the Japanese authorities designed to disrupt ongoing Hangul research. After enduring a year in prison, he was released on probation by the Hamhung District Court on September 18, 1943.

Following Korean liberation, Kim Yun-kyong dedicated his career to Korean education through numerous academic and advisory roles (see "Career: After Korean liberation"). He suffered a heart attack on February 3, 1969, during a visit to the Ulsan Industrial Complex at the age of 76. He died at Busan First Hospital, and his funeral, held as a public ceremony, took place on February 9 in Gwangjiwon-ri, Jungbu-myeon, Gwangju County, Gyeonggi Province.

== Career ==
=== Before Korean liberation ===
Kim Yun-kyong played a central role in the Hangul initiatives pursued by the Joseon Language Society. After being reinstated as a teacher at Paiwha Girls' General High School, he was appointed to the editorial committee for the Joseon Language Dictionary (조선어사전) to systematically organize the accumulated results of Hangul research. In 1930, he joined the committee responsible for the Proposal for Unified Korean Orthography (한글 맞춤법 통일안), and in 1931, he was elected to the Committee for the Examination of the Standard Joseon Language (조선어 표준어 사정 위원회; 朝鮮語標準語査定委員會). Simultaneously, he led educational efforts for Hangul. Supported by The Dong-A Ilbo newspaper in 1931, he toured the nation with Deok-gyu Kwon and others to teach Hangul. In May 1934, he also participated as a founding member of the Jindan Society (진단학회; 震檀學會), an organization formed to study Korean history and language.

=== After Korean liberation ===
Following Korean liberation, Kim Yun-kyong tried to disseminate and research Hangul. In August 1945, he was appointed as the executive director of the Joseon Language Society (조선어학회) and lectured as an instructor at the Korean Language Revival Workshop (국어부흥강습회; 國語復興講習會). By October of the same year, he became a professor at his alma mater, Yonhi College. By November, he served as the dean of its College of Liberal Arts. From September 1947 to September 1948, he took on the role of acting president of Yonhi University (Yonhi College was officially recognized as a university in 1946), focusing on its management and national education projects.

Starting in 1952, he held numerous positions including a specialist advisor for the Ideological Guidance Bureau of the Ministry of Education (문교부 사상지도원), a member of the National Institute of Korean History, and a member of the Teacher Restoration Committee (교사복구추진위원회) following the Korean War. He also served on the National Education Review Committee (대한교육심의위원회), was a Korean language specialist on the Curriculum Revision Review Committee (교수요목개정심의회 국어위원), and participated in the Textbook Typography Improvement Committee of the Ministry of Education (문교부 교과용도서활자개량위원). Additionally, he was the dean of the Graduate School at Yonhi University, a member of the Korean Language Council (국어심의회), and a member of the Educational Textbook Compilation Review Committee (교육용도서편찬심의위원회). In 1954, he was elected as a member of the Humanities & Social Sciences Division of the National Academy of Sciences, Republic of Korea.

Even after he retired from Yonsei University (Yonhi University was renamed Yonsei University in 1957) at the age of 69 in 1962, he continued to contribute as a member of the Korean Language Council, and as a lecturer at Sookmyung Women's University Graduate School and Hanyang University. In 1963, he was appointed as a professor at the College of Liberal Arts at Hanyang University. In 1964, he assumed the role of chairman of the National Association of Korean Language and Literature Professors (전국국어국문학교수단).

== Achievements ==
=== Joseon Script and History of Joseon Linguistics ===
This scholarly work details the history of the development of Korean linguistics and related research achievements. It was first published in January 1938, while Kim Yun-kyong was incarcerated due to the Self-Cultivation Friendship Association incident (see "Biography: Later life and death"), by the Joseon Memorial Library Publishing House (조선기념도서출판관; 朝鮮紀念圖書出版館). A second edition was released in February 1938, a third edition in 1946 by Jin Hak Publishing Association (진학출판협회; 震學出版協會), and a fourth edition in 1954 by Dongguk Culture Company (동국문화사; 東國文化社).

The content is divided into two main parts: the Introductory Section and the Main Discussion. The Introductory Section covers the classification of languages, characteristics of the Ural-Altaic language family, the scope of the Korean language, and the origins and types of scripts. The Main Discussion is split into two chapters: Scripts before the invention of Hunminjeongeum, and the Hunminjeongeum. The latter chapter elaborates on the script's name, reasons for its creation, thoughtful considerations during its development, its properties, its value, various theories about its origin, and a summary of changes since its distribution. Additionally, this chapter explores the main text of the book Hunminjeongeum.

The book Joseon Script and History of Joseon Linguistics (조선문자 급 어학사; 朝鮮文字及語學史, 1938) is recognized as an authoritative text on Hangul research. It offers a clear explanation of the script's originality through a genealogical analysis of its development and sets a benchmark for future studies on Hangul. Furthermore, it is credited with aiding scholars recognize the originality of Hangul and contributing to the cultivation of Korea's unique culture. Kim Yun-kyong's focus on the history of Korean linguistics aligns with the spirit of independence in seeking the origins of Hangul and the Korean people.

=== Korean Grammar ===
Employing his analytical perspective on language, Kim Yun-kyong developed the grammatical system of Si-gyeong Ju, which led to the publication of Grammar of Joseon Language (조선말본) in 1926, Grammar of Hangul (한글말본) in 1946, and Korean Grammar (나라말본) in 1948. The latter, Korean Grammar (나라말본, 1948), is considered as the culmination of Kim's grammatical system. Compiled as a textbook for middle and high school students, this work is the final grammar book to be published, written from a structuralist and analytical linguistic perspective. It is noted for its infusion of a normative linguistic view based on nationalism.

It is structured into three main parts: Sori-gal (소리갈; phonetics and phonology), Ssi-gal (씨갈; morphology), and Wol-gal (월갈; syntax). Sori-gal describes consonants and vowels of the Korean language, details variations in length, strength, and pitch of sounds, explores sound assimilation, addresses the pronunciation of consonants depending on their position in a syllable, discusses sound reduction, and explains sounds that are commonly used but deviate from standard grammar. According to Sori-gal, the Korean language has eight articulation places.

Ssi-gal, in which 'Ssi' relates closely to the concept of morphemes, is divided into Saenggak-ssi (생각씨; lexical morphemes), To-ssi (토씨; grammatical morphemes), and Moeim-ssi (모임씨; combinations of the two). It further classifies Saenggak-ssi into nouns, adjectives, and verbs, To-ssi into postpositions, conjunctions, and sentence-ending particles, and Moeim-ssi into determiners, adverbs, and interjections, which results in nine parts of speech in total.

Wol-gal, where 'Wol' refers to sentences composed of multiple words, divides sentence components into Imja-gam (임자감; subject), Puri-gam (풀이감; predicate), and Kkumim-gam (꾸밈감; modifier). This section delineates the classification, arrangement, and omission of each component, discusses subject and predicate phrases, examines the matching of honorifics between subjects and predicates, describes various sentence types, and concludes with illustrations.

=== Other works ===
1926 Grammar of Joseon Language (조선말본)

1938 Joseon Script and History of Joseon Linguistics (조선문자 급 어학사; 朝鮮文字及語學史), published in January, 2nd edition in February 1938, 3rd edition in 1946, and 4th edition in 1954

1946 Grammar of Hangul (한글말본)

1948 Korean Grammar (나라말본)

1948 Middle School Grammar (중등말본)

1955 History of the Korean Language Society and the Korean Language Movement (한글 학회와 한글 운동의 역사)

1955 Lectures on 'Song of Dragons Flying in Heaven' (「용비어천가(龍飛御天歌)」 강의)

1957 High School Korean Grammar (고등 나라말본)

1957 Middle School Korean Grammar (중등 나라말본)

1960 Biography of Ju Si-gyeong (주시경 선생 전기)

1963 Newly Written History of Korean Linguistics (새로 지은 국어학사)

1964 Collection of Hangyeol's Korean Linguistics Papers (한결 국어학논집; 國語學論集)

== Awards and honors ==
1955 Honorary Doctorate from Yonhi University (in recognition of his contributions to the academic and cultural development of South Korea by revealing the historical evolution of Korean characters and language and researching the grammar of the Korean language)

1957 Christian Achievement Award, Korean Language Achievement Award

1962 Academic Cultural Development Contribution Award, Hangul Achievement Award

1963 Order of Cultural Merit, (reclassified as the Order of Civil Merit, Mugunghwa Medal following the enactment of the Awards and Decorations Act in December 1963)

1977 National Foundation Medal

1990 Order of Merit for National Foundation, Patriotic Medal

== Controversies ==
There has been criticism of Kim Yun-kyong's remark on Ch'oe Manli – a scholar and official from the early Joseon period – who submitted a petition along with other scholars against the creation of Hangul in 1444. In Kim's book Joseon Script and History of Joseon Linguistics (조선문자 급 어학사/朝鮮文字及語學史, 1946), he characterizes Ch'oe as "a mentally deficient person who opposed the creation of Hangul". Boh-yuong Shin, a professor of Political Science at Konkuk University, argues that this assessment has led to Ch'oe being unfairly maligned as a historical sinner. He maintains that such a portrayal distorts Ch'oe's true intentions and unjustly diminishes him to enhance King Sejong's achievements with Hangul. Shin emphasized that while Ch'oe Manli regarded the invention of Hangul as a significant accomplishment, he also expressed several concerns about its implications and worried about its adverse effects on King Sejong's health. Furthermore, he contends that while Ch'oe did commit errors, the criticism he receives is disproportionately harsh.

In an interview published in the Kyunghyang Shinmun on December 20, 1965, Kim Yun-kyong remarked, "Initially, it felt unfamiliar and awkward, but the successful replacement of 'bento (べんとう)' with 'dosirak (도시락)', 'donburi (どんぶり)' with 'deopbap' (덮밥), and 'yakiniku (やきにく)' with 'bulgogi (불고기)' serves as an excellent example." This statement sparked controversy over whether 'bulgogi' is a derivative of 'yakiniku'. Drawing from Kim's interview, Kyo-ik Hwang – a former journalist now a blogger and YouTuber – mentioned on a TV program and his Facebook page in 2018 that 'bulgogi' is a Korean adaptation of the Japanese word 'yakiniku'. He argued, referencing Kim's statements, that during the Japanese colonial period, there was an initiative to translate Japanese terms into Korean, including 'bulgogi', which implies that the word was derived from 'yakiniku'.

However, Hwang's claim has been met with criticism from several linguists. Yang-jin Kim, a professor of Korean Language and Literature at Kyung Hee University, suggested that Kim's remarks should be interpreted as advocating the use of existing but seldom-used Korean words instead of their Japanese counterparts and therefore do not support Hwang's assertion. Furthermore, Ji-hyeong Kim, a professor of Korean Language and Culture at Kyung Hee Cyber University, stated that Kim Yun-kyong's comments advocate for the purification of the Korean language through the replacement of foreign terms with native ones but do not substantiate the claim that 'bulgogi' originated from 'yakiniku'.
