= Choe Hyeon-bae =

Korean linguist (1894–1970)

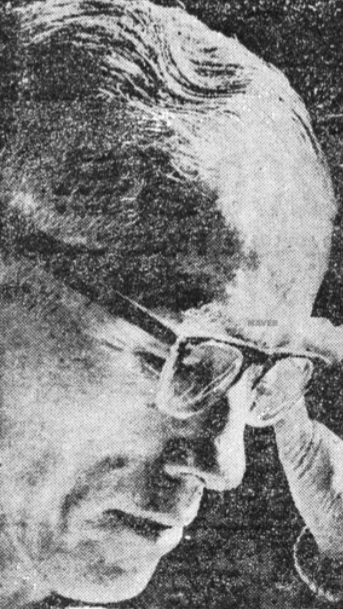

Korean name
- Hangul: 최현배
- Hanja: 崔鉉培
- RR: Choe Hyeonbae
- MR: Ch'oe Hyŏnbae

Art name
- Hangul: 외솔
- RR: Oesol
- MR: Oesol

Choe Hyeon-bae (Note: also spelt Čhoi Hyŏn-pai.) (Korean: 최현배; 19 October 1894 – 23 March 1970), also known by the pen name Oesol, was an educationalist and scholar of the Korean language.

== Early life and career ==
Choe's family was part of the Gwangju Choe bongwan. He was born in Ulsan, South Gyeongsang Province, Joseon. He did his secondary education at Gyeongseong High School (경성고등보통학교, in modern-day Seoul; now Kyunggi High School), and in 1910 entered the Korean Language Academy (조선어강습원), where he studied under Ju Sigyeong. He graduated from the Hiroshima Higher Normal School (廣島高等師範学學校, now Hiroshima University) in Hiroshima, Japan in 1919. In 1920, he began teaching at the private Dongnae High School (동래고등보통학교), but in 1922 returned to the Hiroshima Higher Normal School for further studies, and then entered the philosophy department of Kyoto Imperial University, graduating in 1925. He began teaching at the Yonhee Technical School (the predecessor of Yonsei University) in 1926, but in 1938 was removed from the service due to his involvement in a 1938 incident at the Heungeop Club. He was reinstated as a librarian at Yonhee College in May 1941, but resigned in October of the same year due to the Joseon Language Institute incident. During this incident key members of the organization were arrested, tried, and jailed by the colonial administration for their ties to the pro-independence Korean language movement, including Choe, who was jailed for four years until Korea formally achieved independence from Japan in 1945.

After the surrender of Japan ended World War II, Choe became the head of South Korea's Ministry of Education's Textbook Compilation Bureau and served two terms, once from 1945 to 1948, and then from 1951 to 1954. In 1954, Choe returned to teach at Yonhee University and served as both the dean and vice president of the College of Humanities. In 1955, he was awarded an honorary doctorate from Yonhee University for his scholarship of the Korean language and services to the field. In addition, Choe served as the chairman of the Korean Language Society in 1949, leading the association for more than 20 years as a central figure of the Korean language movement. He reached retirement age in 1961 and was subsequently appointed emeritus professor following his retirement.

Throughout his lifetime, Choe focused his scholarly efforts on literary and pedagogical research, the establishment of Korean language policies, and the promotion of the Korean language movement, amassing a body of work that totaled more than 20 books and 100 published papers and articles. His study of the Korean language is exemplified in the books Korean Language (우리말본) and Hangul-gal (한글갈), the former of which was first published partially in 1929 and was published in its entirety in 1937. This publication is a compilation of grammatical studies of Korean in the 20th century, and inherits the theoretical framework established with Ju Sikyeong's research while also expanding on existing studies. At the time of its publication, Korean Language was the most advanced grammar book in terms of the breadth and accuracy of cited data and clarity of logic. Hangul-gal, published in 1941, seeks to systematize Korean language research, and is divided in two sections: historical and theoretical. In the historical section, Choe discusses the motives and circumstances of the enactment of Hangul, Hangul literature, and the history of Hangul research, while in the theoretical section, he proposes a theoretical reconstruction of the approximate sound value and usage of letters that have disappeared since the enactment of Hangeul in the early-mid Joseon Dynasty.

Choe was also a leading voice in the post-independence Korean language movement and published prolifically on the necessity of establishing a centralized Korean language policy. He developed a theory of Hangul conversation and writing and argued for adopting a horizontal writing system for Hangeul instead of the widely used Sino-Japanese vertical notation. His theoretical framework for Korean grammar and language policy can be seen in publications such as The Revolution of Letters (글자의 혁명, 1947), The Struggle of Hangul (한글의 투쟁, 1958) and The Claim of Writing Only Hangul (한글만 쓰기의 주장, 1970), which was published posthumously. Choe was also a proponent of the Korean language movement, which emphasized a cultural and nationalistic unity underpinned by the Korean language, as well as a postcolonial and decolonial effort to expel the remainders of Japanese colonial influence from the language, as can be seen in the publication The Fundamental Meaning of Respect for the Korean Language (우리말 존중의 근본 뜻, 1953).

While Choe is mainly remembered for his contribution to scholarly research of the Korean language, he also displayed interest in developing a pedagogical approach to Hangul, beginning with his 1925 graduate thesis on the pedagogy of Johann Heinrich Pestalozzi. In The Way of Rehabilitation of the Korean People (조선민족갱생의 도, 1926), Choe synthesizes pedagogy with nationalist enlightenment ideals and diagnoses "defects in the nature of the Korean people" In this text he investigates what he believes to be the historical causes of these defects and proposes a revival of cultural and ethical principles including patriotism and loyalty as the solution. He continued to expand on these ideas after independence with publications like Road to Loving the Country (나라사랑의 길, 1958) and Education to Save the Country (나라 건지는 교육, 1963), in which he points to a love of people and country as the way forward for a free and independent Korea.

== Views ==
While his tenure as director of the Textbook Compilation Bureau of the Ministry of Education (문교부 편수국장) resulted in a widespread implementation of modernized approaches to Korean language policy, there are still disputes over whether Choe provided the majority of the theoretical background for this approach. Despite this, it is undoubtedly due to Choe that the modern Korean textbook still utilizes the horizontal writing system, of which he was a strong proponent of.

Choe was also an advocate of writing Korean entirely in hangul rather than in mixed script (hangul and hanja). He saw the overuse of Sino-Korean vocabulary, with its many homonyms, as a symptom of the problematic elevation of foreign culture in Korean society. He believed that Korea had always been a "junior member" of the "Chinese character cultural community", and argued that continuing participation in that sphere was no longer necessary in modern Korea. He also argued that time spent learning hanja in primary school fostered cramming and rote memorisation, and took time away from more important studies.

Choe Hyeon-bae made significant contributions to the field of Hangul studies and education. As a scholar, he was a vanguard in standardizing and establishing the study of Hangul grammar as well as pedagogical and theoretical approaches to the Korean language movement. He was also a lifelong educator dedicated to national revival, and following independence, the democratic construction of the newly freed Korea. His scholarly legacy has been inherited by modern day scholars of the Korean Language Society, and in 1970 the Oesol Association (외솔회) was established following his death in order to publish the journal Nara Sarang (나라사랑). The annual Oesol Award was also established by the same association in his honor, and seeks to continue Choe's spirit by awarding eminent and emerging scholars in Korean studies and the Korean language movement.

== Selected publications ==
- 1926: 《朝鮮民族更生의道》, OCLC 222417106, 37640834 (1962 and 1971 reprints)
- 1937: 《우리말본》, OCLC 48199495, 122769409, 17042434, 222368991 (1955, 1971, 1979, and 1994 reprints)
- 1940: 《한글갈》
- 1947: 《글자의 혁명 : 漢字안쓰기와 한글 가로 쓰기》, OCLC 122749696
- 1950: 《한글의 투쟁》, OCLC 20655888 (1958 reprint)
- 1963: 《한글 가로글씨 독본》, OCLC 48183860

== Sources ==
- Hannas, W. (August 1991), "Korean Views on Writing Reform", in Mair, Victor H. (ed.), Schriftfestschrift: Essays in Honor of John DeFrancis on His Eightieth Birthday (PDF), Sino-Platonic Papers #27, pp. 85–94
- "최현배/崔鉉培 (1894.10.19~1970.3.23)", Doosan Encyclopedia, Doosan Donga, 2007
