= Wanwolhoemaengyeon =

Korean novel

Wanwolhoemaengyeon (Korean: 완월회맹연; Hanja: 玩月會盟宴; lit. A Promise Made During a Moon Gazing Banquet) is a novel with a plot that revolves around the conflict between the stepmother and her stepchildren. It was written in hangeul and is considered to have been written by Lady Yi of Jeonju (全州李氏, 1694–1743), the mother of Ahn Gyeomje, in the early 18th century. It is one of the lengthiest books with 180 chapters in 180 volumes and is considered a masterpiece of classical Korean novels for its quality.

== Authorship ==
A record in Songnamjapji (松南雜識 Miscellaneous Writings by Songnam) compiled by Songnam Jo Jaesam (趙在三, 1808–1866) states, “Wanwol was written by the mother of Ahn Gyeomje (安兼濟, 1724-unknown), who wished to gain fame and honor by passing it over to the royal court.” Scholars presume that Wanwol mentioned in this record is Wanwolhoemaengyeon.

== Plot ==
Diachronically, it is a story that follows four generations of the Jeong family; synchronically, it focuses on the events of the Jeong family and also tells the stories of other families that are related to the Jeong family by marriage. The members of the third generation of the Jeong family are the central figures in this novel, which mainly depicts the birth of the third generation, their growth and marriage, social accomplishments, and filial piety and brotherly love.

Early in the novel, a birthday banquet is held for Jeong Han, a member of the first generation of the Jeong family. Jeong Han's eldest son Jeong Jam does not have a son and ends up adopting his younger brother Jeongsam's son Jeong Inseong. At the birthday banquet, Jeong Inseong is named the successor of the family and promises of marriages are made with family friends. Two members of the third generation of the Jeong family, Jeong Inseong and Jeong Ingwang, become betrothed to Yi Jayeom and Jang Seongwan, respectively. The two couples who are bound by promises of marriage suffer numerous hardships and difficulties until they eventually marry and live in harmony. The two main conflicts in this novel are the conflict involving the naming of the family's successor and the conflict between the father-in-law and the sons-in-law. The former conflict occurs when Jeong Jam's second wife So Gyowan slanders Jeong Inseong and his wife Yi Jayeom to make her own son the successor of the Jeong family, while the latter conflict occurs between Jeong Ingwang and his father-in-law Jang Heon. While Jeong Inseong is a man of virtue with a calm and mild personality, Jeong Ingwang is a heroic character with a strong and reckless disposition. Ingwang's father in law Jang Heon is a weak-minded man without a sense of shame who grovels before the powerful. Immediately after the Jeong family collapses, Jang betrays them despite being indebted to them. Considering the ungrateful Jang Heon as his sworn enemy, Ingwang shifts his wrath to his wife Jang Seongwan. The conflict between Ingwang and his father-in-law is extremely intense, to the point that Ingwang demands his wife to commit suicide. However, an even more important conflict in the novel involves the issue of family succession, which is evidenced by the main narrative of the novel beginning with So Gyowan's plot against Jeong Inseong and ending with her becoming a completely changed person.

== Features and Significance ==
The theme of Wanwolhoemangyeon is well-depicted in the conflict in family succession: filial piety. Even with the knowledge of the stepmother's schemes and willingness to murder them, Jeong Inseong and his wife Yi Jayeom silently bear all the burden, sacrificing themselves to cover for her lack of virtue.

Wanwolhoemaengyeon is a novel written by the first woman writer who has been rather specifically identified. Lady Yi from the Jeonju Yi clan had the cultural sophistication and skills to write a novel, considering the popularity of novels written in hangeul reaching its peak in the 18th century, the highest levels of scholarship attained by both her parents’ family and her husband's family, and the high level of cultural sophistication of the Korean nobility including the family of Lady Yi. Also, there was a culture of the whole family getting together to write and enjoy reading novels written in hangeul (Korean alphabet) among the Korean nobility at the time. Taking into consideration the possibility of a group being involved in writing, it seems difficult to deny the record that states the author of Wanwolhoemaengyeon as Lady Yi from the Jeonju Yi clan. Wanwolhoemaengyeon is a classical masterpiece created relatively early, in the eighteenth century, that is unique in terms of length and quality writing. The sheer length of the novel is enormously long, matched only by Pak Kyung-Ri's Land. It also boasts quality writing, particularly in terms of writing style and content. Among the classic novels written in hangeul, it is the most difficult to interpret but also has an elegant writing style. Based on these facts, some denied that it was authored by a woman, but continued research showed a high likelihood of a woman writer for this novel, which has since become an indicator of women's intellect at the time. Another characteristic feature of Wanwolhoemaengyeon is the narrative of scenes that focus on the details of dialogues, characters’ emotions, and aspects of daily life throughout the gradual progress of events.

== Texts ==
There are three different editions of the novel. The “Nakseonjaebon” consisting of 180 chapters in 180 volumes housed at the Academy of Korean Studies and the “Kyujanggakbon” consisting of 180 chapters in 93 volumes are complete sets of the novel. There is an incomplete set of six chapters in five volumes of the novel, housed at Yonsei University. This lengthy novel was set in modern type by Professor Kim Jin-Se of Seoul National University and was printed by Seoul National University Press.

== See also ==
- Story of So Hyeonseong
