= Lee Man-gyu =

North Korean linguist and politician (1889–1978)

- Hangul: 이만규
- Hanja: 李萬珪
- RR: I Mangyu
- MR: I Man'gyu

Lee Man-gyu (Korean: 이만규; 1889–1978), was an educator, linguist of Korean, and Korean independence activist. After the Japanese colonial period, he aligned himself with North Korea. His art name was Yaja (也自, "myself" in Japanese).

He was an educator, scholar of Korean literature, and researcher of Korean language during the Japanese colonial period. He stayed in North Korea following the Inter-Korean negotiations in April 1948, and participated in the establishment of North Korea.

== Life ==
He was born in Wonju, Gangwon, Joseon.

He studied medicine for three years at Daehan Hospital, graduating in 1910, but practised medicine for only 7 months. He served as the principal of Baehwa Girls' Middle School, and was a friend and in-law of Yeo Woon-hyung. As a member of the Korean Language Society he was arrested in 1942 by the Japanese colonial authorities, and imprisoned. He was also involved in the Hanyeongseowon patriotic song incident, the March 1 Independence Movement, the Heungeop Club incident, and for these was arrested four times and imprisoned three times, spending more than 18 months in prison.

After participating in inter-Korean negotiations in April 1948, he remained in North Korea and participated in the establishment of the government of North Korea in September of that year. Until his death in 1978, he was a socialist politician and unification activist who served as a representative of the Supreme People's Assembly, the chairman of the Joseon Character Reform Committee, and the president of the History of the Unification of the Fatherland. He served as the director of general education in North Korea, and led the translation project of Goryeosa and Rijo Annals early on.

== Works ==
- The History of Joseon Education (published, 1988)

== See also ==
- Lee Man-gyu, the core of the Korean Language Society, was actually a pro-Japanese
- ANALYSIS OF 'THE EDUCATIONAL HISTORY OF CHOSUN' BY LEE MAN KYU
- Yoon Hyung Park; Tae Sook Hong; Kyu Hwan Sihn; Sun Mi Lim; Hee Gon Kim (1 December 2008). "Medical doctors' independence movement during the Japanese colonial period". Ui sahak (in Korean). 17 (2): 223–237. ISSN 1225-505X. PMID 19174627. Wikidata Q119912356.
- Lee Gil Sang (2012). "Lee Man-gyu's National Identity during the Hwangminhwa Period - Focused on the Pro-Japanese Tendency -National identity of Lee Man-gyu - mental anguish and pro-Japanese vestiges". The History of Korean Education (in Korean). 34 (1): 57–78. doi:10.15704/KJHE.34.1.201203.57. ISSN 2713-6019. Wikidata Q119913138.
