= Inhyeon wanghu jeon =

Korean novel about Queen Inhyeon

Inhyeon wanghu jeon (Korean: 인현왕후전) is a novel written in Hangul about Queen Inhyeon (1667–1701), the second queen consort of King Sukjong of Joseon (1661–1720). She becomes queen and moves into the royal palace, only to be dethroned due to the slander by Jang Hui-bin, the King's concubine. But later, she clears her name and comes back to the palace. The novel is based on a true story.

== Author ==
Its author and date of publication are unknown, but it is estimated to have been written in the late Joseon period. When the novel was first introduced to the academic world, some thought that it was written by a court lady. Later, others offered that it was written by a descendant of Queen Inhyeon's clan or a family member of Pak Tae-bo, who died after publicly opposing the dethronement of Queen Inhyeon.

== Plot ==
Queen Inhyeon is the daughter of Min Yu-jung and his wife Lady Song, who has a bizarre dream before giving birth to her. From early age, Queen Inhyeon is virtuous, intelligent, and excellent at needlework, and she gets more and more beautiful as she ages. When Queen Inkyeong, the first queen consort of King Sukjong, dies early, she is chosen as the next queen at the age of fourteen. After she becomes queen, she shows generosity and carries out many good deeds. King Sukjong remains childless until the age of thirty, so Queen Inhyeon begs him to get a concubine. When he does, she treats the new concubine, Lady Kim, with respect. However, Lady Kim soon dies and the King's beloved court lady named Jang gives birth to a son and gets elevated to the title of Hui-bin.

Jang Hui-bin wants Queen Inhyeon out of the royal palace, so she slanders her, claiming that the Queen is trying to harm Lady Jang and her son. As King Sukjong is deeply in love with her, he deposes of Queen according to Jang's plot. Numerous officials admonish him that it is unjust, but he does not listen and punishes them, instead. Queen Inhyeon moves out to a palace in Anguk-dong and lives there, considering herself a sinner.

King Sukjong elevates Jang Hui-bin to the queen consort, gives government posts to her family members, and appoints their son as the crown prince. For about three or four years Jang's family members abuse their power and the King gradually realizes what Jang has really done. At the same time, Jang senses that the King is changing, and tries to harm Queen Inhyeon by framing her for engaging in treason. However, the King takes this opportunity to eliminate disloyal officials, prove the Queen's innocence, and reinstall her as the queen consort.

Queen Inhyeon moves back to the royal palace and resumes her good deeds, while Jang Hui-bin holds grudges for losing the love of King Sukjong and invites shamans and psychics to put all kinds of curses on the Queen to kill her. As a result, the Queen dies at the age of thirty five, eight years after her reinstallation. The King grieves her death deeply. One day, Queen Inhyeon appears in the King's dream to tell him about Jang's misdeeds, so he goes to Jang's palace and finds all the pieces of evidence and witnesses to prove that Jang had cursed the Queen. Then he punishes those who are close to Jang and orders her poisoned as a death penalty.

== Features and significance ==
Inhyeon wanghu jeon is a fictionalized version of the true story featuring historical figures. People of the Joseon period enjoyed the story of King Sukjong, Jang Hui-bin, and Queen Inhyeon, but those living in the present day appreciate it, as well. The novel shows how people at that time understood and enjoyed the historical event in the realm of literature.

Queen Inhyeon and Jang Hui-bin are the epitomes of good and evil. Queen Inhyeon represents a person who pursues the norms and virtues of the society to which she belongs, and Jang a person who acts selfishly on her desires and interests. The conflict between the good and the evil ends with the victory of the good and the punishment of the evil, which sends the strong message that good deeds will bring good fortune, and thus are encouraged, while evil deeds will bring disasters and punishment.

The novel, set in the royal palace, describes the life and customs of the royal court, and so has value as a historical material with which one can learn about courtly culture.

== Texts ==
There are nineteen manuscripts and one text printed with a letterpress printer of the old times. They are all written in Hangul and do not vary largely in content. The oldest, privately owned by Yu Gu-sang, is estimated to have been published in 1836 or 1786, because the year "byeong-o" of the sexagenary cycle is imprinted on the manuscript. The one in the best condition, Inhyeon syeongmo minsi deokhaengnok 63 jangbon (Garambon), was published in the journal Munjang in 1940 by Lee Byeong-gi, styled Garam, who introduced the manuscript with his own comments. It excels in quality, because of the detailed descriptions, elaborate story structure, coherent sentences, and elegant prose. It is in possession of Garam-mungo, Seoul University Kyujanggak Institute for Korean Studies.

== See also ==
- Story of So Hyeonseong
