= Yu ssi samdaerok =

Korean novel

Yussisamdaerok (劉氏三代錄 The Story of Three Generations of the Yu Family) is a novel written in hangeul about the various incidents that occur in the Yu Family over three generations. The novel consists of 20 kwon (equivalent to a chapter) and 20 chaek (equivalent to volume). It is the sequel to Yuhyogongseonhaengrok (柳孝公善行錄 The Story of the Good Deeds of Yu Yeon and is one of the many serial novels that cover three generations of a family. Considered one of the works that show the lofty preferences of mainly the upper class, it is mentioned in various records and also exists in many different editions, which seems to suggest that it was the most popular novel in the late Joseon dynasty.

== Authorship ==
The author of Yussisamdaerok is unknown. Records of this novel are found in Yeonamjip (燕巖集 A Collection of Essays by Yeonam) by Bak Jiwon (朴趾源, 1737–1805)), Hanjungnok (閑中錄 A Record of Sorrowful Days) by Lady Hyegyeong (惠慶宮 洪氏, 1735–1815), Jemangsilmyomun (祭亡室墓文 A Funeral Oration for Dead Wife) by Yu Sukgi (兪肅基, 1696–1752), and therefore it is estimated to have been written before the first half of the 18th century.

== Plot ==
Yussisamdaerok tells the story of the growth of the Yu family, mainly focusing on the marital conflicts of the Yu brothers of the first generation (Yu Baekgyeong and Yu Useong), second generation (Yu Segi and Yu Sehyeong), and the third generation (Yu Gwan and Yu Hyeon). The stories of the first and third generations are relatively fewer, and therefore the stories of the second generation of the Yu family are central to the novel. The novel paints a detailed picture of the people of the second generation of the Yu family, such as Yu Segi, Yu Sehyeong, Yu Sechang, Yu Segyeong, Yu Sepil, and Seolyeong, Hyeonyoung, and Okyeong, from their marriages to civil service exams, marital conflicts, prosperity, and death. Each married couple in the story has a different type of relationship. There are a gentleman and a lady in a happy marriage; a man who is already betrothed to a woman but is selected to be a princess’ husband which causes a conflict with his wife-to-be; a couple in a conflict because the husband falls in love with a woman fighter he meets after marrying a lady; a couple with different personalities who come to accept each other after a near-death experience; a wife who is mistreated by her grandmother-in-law and is able to live together with her husband only after she moves the grandmother-in-law's heart; and a couple where the generous husband attempts to reign in his headstrong wife by mistreating her but accepts her as she is after her near-death experience and live happily together.

The central character in the novel is Princess Jinyang, who is married to Yu Sehyeong, one of the second-generation members of the Yu family. After she marries into the Yu family, she changes her husband, who is originally at odds with her, and also resolves various problems in and outside of the family. Around the time of the Queen Mother's death, Princess Jinyang falls ill and dies at the age of 25. On her deathbed, she prepares a sealed letter for the Yu family, and the Yu family overcomes a number of crises thanks to her letter. Similar marital conflicts are repeated in the third generation of the Yu family, but the narrative progresses in a way where the various conflicts are happily resolved. The novel ends with the members of the Yu family enjoying prosperity as the previous generations had and bringing honor to the family.

== Features and Significance ==
While the preceding novel Yuhyogongseonhaengrok tells the origin of the Yu family, starting with the virtuous gentleman Yu Yeon, Yussisamdaerok features Princess Jinyang as the person who makes the most contributions to the Yu family. While it maintains the same setting as the preceding work, it is considered to have been created with a focus on a different set of issues. Among the various characters in the book, Princess Jinyang, who marries Yu Sehyeong, plays a central role in the Yu family. In fact, she becomes the main character of a derivative novel titled Yeowarok (女媧錄 The Story of Yeowa) from the late Joseon dynasty. As Princess Jinyang is considered the most idealistic character in Yussisamdaerok, some scholars have deemed this novel Jinyanggongjujeon (晉陽公主錄 The Story of Princess Jinyang) that borrows the structure of a three-generation family story, and the novel also received attention for its view of women. The fact that different types of deaths are portrayed in the novel is also considered a characteristic unique to Yussisamdaerok.

== Texts ==
Since the novel began to be studied in 1978 by Lee Su-bong, a number of different editions were discovered. Currently there are over 40 different editions of the novel, all handwritten in hangeul. The difference between the different editions is too minimal to be considered as different versions.

== See also ==
- Story of So Hyeonseong
