= Baegot =

Planned community in South Korea

Coordinates: 37.3631°N 126.7139°E

- Hangul: 배곧
- RR: Baegot
- MR: Paegot

Baegot New Town is an under-construction planned community in the vicinity of Incheon and Songdo International City in Siheung, Gyeonggi Province, South Korea. Nearly twice the area of Yeouido [island in the Han river] in area, it is considered the nation's largest town development undertaking since 2000. Seoul National University Siheung Campus is to be located here.

== Etymology ==
The name Baegot originated in 1914 when Ju Si-gyeong used it to name a Korean language school. It means "learning place", suggesting that the town is intended to become a significant center for education.

== Background ==
Baegot New Town was originally landfilled from a site used from 1985 to 1996 as an explosion testing ground. In the early days, it was called Gun-ja. Siheung bought the property in 2006 and decided to develop it as a new city with Hanhwa Group. Originally, the company tried to build a new city by reclaiming Sihwa Lake, but failed due to pollution problems. After that, it turned to the reclamation of the Gun-ja district.

Baegot New Town is expected to become a center for education and medical care near the new residential area of Siheung. Most of the existing apartments in Siheung are over 20 years old. The central area of Siheung lacks cultural and educational facilities, except for the central area. Presently, it is dominated by residential and industrial areas.

The new development is located on the west side of Incheon Free Economic Zone, including Songdo, Cheongra and Yeongjong. Siheung aims to take advantage of its geographical situation. It will be developed as the center of future west coast development. The Siheung developer has experience building cities.

== Transport ==
=== Subway ===
In December 2014, the subway station, Darwol station of the Suin line was opened at the eastern end of Baegot New Town. However, a potential access road is blocked by National Highway No. 77 and the Siheung Vehicle Office. Therefore, bus routes in Baegot are connected to Oido station or Wolgot station. As a result, a new subway station is under consideration. The Korean government gave 100,000,000 won for a feasibility study of constructing the Baegot station.

=== Roads ===
Jeongwang IC in the third Seoul-Incheon Expressway reaches Baegot New Town. The town has a road network that includes Wolgot IC in the Yeongdong Expressway and 77 National Highway. The West Coast~Gun-ja Road and Wolgot Bridge are scheduled to expand.

Siheung is carrying out a traffic improvement project in Baegot New town budgeted at about 500 billion won. The project includes eight phases, including expansion into the coastal roads and the establishment of a bypass road to the Seohaean Expressway. The expansion of Jeongwang IC and the construction of Wolgot IC were completed in September 2017. Construction is underway to expand Sorae road connecting Incheon Nonhyeon District in the first half of 2018 and the first phase of the Bonghwa Road (Dongwon road intersection to Mayu road intersection) is to be completed in October 2018. By the first half of 2020, all construction projects are scheduled to be completed including the 8-lane extension of the Wolgot-Sincheon IC and the 12-lane extension of the 2.5 km.

=== Bus ===
Bus 3400 provides the fastest connection between Baegot and Gangnam. Currently, the route is operating in Baegot - Seocho - Seoul National Univ. of Education - Gangnam station - Sadang - Baegot. As of April 2018, the weekday dispatch interval was 40–50 minutes.
