= Mal-Mo-E: The Secret Mission =

- Theatrical release poster
- Hangul: 말모이
- RR: Malmoi
- MR: Malmoi
- Directed by: Eom Yu-na
- Written by: Eom Yu-na
- Starring: Yoo Hae-jin; Yoon Kye-sang
- Cinematography: Choi Young-hwan
- Edited by: Kim Sang-bum
- Music by: Jo Yeong-wook
- Production company: The Lamp
- Distributed by: Lotte Cultureworks
- Release date: January 9, 2019
- Running time: 135 minutes
- Country: South Korea
- Language: Korean
- Box office: US$21.4 million

Mal-Mo-E: The Secret Mission (Korean: 말모이) is a 2019 South Korean historical comedy-drama film written and directed by Eom Yu-na. It was released on January 9, 2019. The title refers to an old Korean dialect word which roughly translates to "collecting vocabularies."

== Synopsis ==
Imprisoned several times during the 1940s, when Korea was under Japanese occupation, Kim Pan-Soo is illiterate and does not know how to read or write Korean Hangul or any other language. The teaching of Korean in the schools is banned by the Imperial Japanese government. He meets a representative of the Korean Language Society and joins forces to publish a dictionary of the Korean language. The story is a fictional treatment of both the work of the Korean Language Society and the 1942 Korean Language Society Incident.

== Cast ==
- Yoo Hae-jin as Kim Pan-soo
- Yoon Kye-sang as Ryu Jung-hwan
- Jo Hyun-do as Kim Duk-jin
- Park Ye-na as Kim Soon-hee
- Kim Sun-young as Goo Ja-young
- Kim Hong-fa as Mr. Jo
- Kim Tae-hoon as Park-hoon
- Woo Hyun as Im Dongik
- Min Jin-woong as Min Woo-chul
- Heo Sung-tae as Ueda
- Lee Sung-wook as Jang Choon-sam
- Cho Hyun-chul as Park Bong-doo
- Song Young-chang as Ryu Wan-taek
- Oh Hee-joon as Mail man
- Choi Gwi-hwa as Mailman (cameo)
- Lee Jung-eun as Jeju teacher (cameo)
- Yoon Kyung-ho as Optometrist (cameo)
- Yoo Eun-mi as Soon-hee (cameo)
- Ye Soo-jung as Jo Gap-yoon's wife (special appearance)
- Yoo Jae-myung as Kim Doo-bong (special appearance)
- Kim Dong-young as Adult Deok-jin (special appearance)

== Historical context ==
The film is based on historical events in Korea during the late 1930s to 1940s. When Korea was under Japanese Imperial rule, the Korean language was "demoted" in status and significance and eventually outright banned in 1938 in favor of the Japanese language. The characters were based on the real-life scholars and members of the Korean Language Society who continued working on the dictionary even after the ban was enforced. In 1942, more than thirty of the group were arrested and imprisoned by the Japanese and two died in prison. The Korean Language Society did not resume activities until Korea re-gained independence after Japan surrendered to the Allies in 1945.

== Reception ==
The film debuted on top of the South Korean box office, where it earned $8.96 million from 1.19 million admissions between Wednesday and Sunday.

Local reviews of the film were largely positive, with South Korean English-language newspaper The Korea Times commending the film for being able to tell "the same old story of these historical figures....but in a fashionable way".

== Movie Information ==
- On December 18, 2018, at the entrance of Lotte Cinema Konkuk University, the press preview of <Malmoi> was attended by director Eom Yu-na and the two main actors Yoo Hae-jin and Yoon Kye-sang.
- Mal-Mo-E, which was released on January 9, 2019 (Wednesday), was screened 4,853 times on 1077 screens on the opening day, and attracted 122,458 audiences. By the 13th (Sunday), the first weekend, 1.18 million viewers were received. The final theater audience is 2.8 million.
