= Lee Eun-sang =

Lee Eun-sang may refer to:

- Lee Eun-sang (poet)
- Lee Eun-sang (singer)
