= Sijo =

Traditional Korean poetic form

- Hangul: 시조
- Hanja: 時調
- RR: sijo
- MR: sijo
- IPA: [ɕi.dʑo]

Sijo (Korean: 시조; Hanja: 時調) is a Korean traditional poetic form that emerged during the Goryeo dynasty, flourished during the Joseon dynasty, and is still written today. Bucolic, metaphysical, and cosmological themes are often explored. The three lines average 14–16 syllables, for a total of 42–48: theme (3, 4,4,4); elaboration (3,4,4,4); counter-theme (3,5) and completion (4,3).

Sijo may be narrative or thematic and introduces a situation in line 1, development in line 2, and twist and conclusion in line 3. The first half of the final line employs a "twist": a surprise of meaning, sound, or other device. Sijo is often more lyrical and personal than other East Asian poetic forms, and the final line can take a profound turn. Yet, "The conclusion of sijo is seldom epigrammatic or witty; a witty close to a sentence would have been foreign to the genius of stylized Korean diction in the great sijo periods."

My close friends I count would be water and stone, pine tree, bamboo.

Moon rising on eastern peaks, there is one more so good to see!

Keeping them, beyond these five friends, what more do I need to add?

윤선도 Yun Sŏndo (1587-1671)

내 벗이 몇 인고 하니 수(水) 석(石)과 송(松) 죽(竹)이라

동산(東山)에 달 오르니 그 더욱 반갑구나

두어라 이 다섯밖에 또 더해 무엇하리

--- From A Lone Flute Resounds, 2015, translations recomposed in English from Korean by Kim Goeng Pil

== Formation & Development ==
Sijo is not simply a poetic form from early Korea, it is also a reflection of the development of Korean history back in the fourteenth century, throughout the Koryŏ dynasty and the Chosŏn dynasty. In the history of early sijo, it functioned as a type of song performed with music and instruments, the purpose of entertainment was the focus of early sijo. Sijo was enjoyed by people from elite classes who were educated and having higher social status, it was performed most often in social and entertainment settings for these people. Therefore, early sijo contains elements such as loyalty, morality, and political values with the influence from Confucian ideas. In addition, due to the entertainment functions of early sijo, its structure also focused on performing more natural rhythm in the expression. However, as the development of written language in Korea, sijo also shifted from verbal performance to more literary purpose for later Korean history.

As the development of literature in Korea and the influence of Confucian ideas, more and more people started to learn and record sijo. Instead of simply perform it for entertainment to educated elite groups, sijo then became more generalized and shared by normal individuals. With the increase in both literature and the accessibility of sijo, it began to be written down and recorded more often. Even women who had a lower social distance at the time started to participate in the development of sijo, which added more emotional and personal feelings into the creation of sijo poems. Furthermore, political instability is also one of the most important influence to the shift of sijo, such as the transition from Koryŏ dynasty to Chosŏn dynasty, the Japanese Invasion from 1592-1598, and the Manchu Invasions, etc. All these wars and political changes contributed to a result that poets started to express personal emotions about social changes, loyalty, and morality. This phenomenon made sijo to shift from performing art into a tool to express feelings and ideas on social comments. As sijo developed to this point, the format and structure of sijo also changed to match the new expression for these more personalized poems. Without function as formal performance tool, its structure was more flexible while keeping the idea to follow natural breathing rhythm. Due to these developments, sijo expanded its function to a wider range of audience with more meaningful purposes, shifting to literature practice in Korea society at the time.

As sijo developed further into modern days, it has been transformed in many ways while still retaining the essential and classic structure of sijo. Nowadays, the poets often change the compositions of sijo to reflect the current social condition. They use the simpler words and take new subjects such as self and life in the daily life routine. Sijo has long changed from the musical performance to the written art, but still, it has the elements of musical performance and vocal art. Now, sijo becomes a part of studies of the Korean literary heritage and it is known around the world by the international education and practice. The coexistence of the conventional contents with dramatic changes gives sijo the reason to still be a living poetic genre.

== Structure ==
=== Elements of early sijo ===
P'yŏng sijo prioritized its grammatical structure for recitation purposes and not writing; so, this made the "rules" of sijo structure quite strict. Authors were mostly of the higher up yangban social class and emphasized how their sijo would be sung melodically first as opposed to written down later. This meant that the rhythmic pattern in these sijos had to be learned exactly to be considered a truthful recitation.

Tang poetry was traditionally rhythmically segmented in its stanzas. This feature was one that was passed down onto p'yŏng sijo as well as other early forms of sijo. Sijo poems often follow a rhythmic structure characterized by the syllabic ways of Chinese and Hangul characters. Specifically, they follow a 3-4-3-4, 3-4-3-4, 3-5-4-3 rhythmic structure per line. An example of the strictness of early sijo is seen especially in their third lines. It sticks hard to the "3-5" syllable rule at the beginning of the third line. This is done so to further drive the rhetorical conclusion of the sijo. As David McCann puts it, syllabic counting plays "a role in patterns of syllable distribution among the four phrases or syllable groups that constitute the lines [of a sijo]." Furthermore, since most p'yŏng sijo were not titled and were spread mostly through recitation, their structure was much more specific and defined than the sijo forms seen later.

춘산(春山)에 눈 녹인 바람 건듯 불고 간듸업네
저근듯 비러다가 뿌리과저 머리우희
귀밋헤 해묵은 서리를 불녀볼까 하노라

— U T'ak (1262-1342)
Translation:

The spring breeze melted snow on the hills, then quickly disappeared.
I wish I could borrow it briefly to blow over my hair
and melt away the aging frost forming now about my ears.

— Larry Gross

=== Elements of developed sijo ===
There are many variants of sijo, ranging from the standard three-line p'yŏng sijo to the slightly expanded ossijo and the greatly expanded narrative sasol sijo. The conventional structure of p'yŏng sijo consists of three lines, with each line broken by a caesura (a midline pause) into two halves. Each hemistich (or half) is further broken into pairs. As a result, there are four groups total in one line. A single group is typically made up of three to five syllables, which results in a composition of approximately forty five syllables (morae). However, these syllabic distributions are the average; variation in syllable count is the rule, not an exception. Sijo is an accentual verse form, not syllabic. A group generally corresponds to syntactic and rhythmic units and can be distinguished by mutual contrast, such as particles or verb endings. All traditional sijo were originally set to melodies that impose further regularity and cadence to each poem.

Total number of syllable variants in 29 kisaeng sijo
Group	I	II	III	IV
Line 1	13	9	14	2
Line 2	13	11	9	1
Line 3	1	18	1	9

The table above illustrates that deviations from the traditional syllabic distribution occur fairly frequently, depending on the position. For example, there are 13 times that group I in line 1 has a syllable count other than 3. In contrast, the ends of the first two lines, as well as groups I and III in the third line, show very little variation. The greater regularity in these positions is directly related to the variation that precedes or follows; the increased regularity ensures the rhythm is not lost.

=== Elements of modern sijo ===
In contrast to the structure of early sijo forms such as p'yŏng sijo, modern sijo sticks mainly to a freer and more fluid way of writing. This is a controversial take amongst the sijo community as some argue that modern sijo focuses "on the revival of sijo, but claim that its traditional fixed form cannot be preserved." Thus, there has been a large wave of people who subscribe to the thought that modern sijo can be written without attention to rhythmic segments and the fixed form. Thus, many modern poets and artists write free-verse works and still claim them as sijo. In Oh's work, the author states that "sijo, even a contemporary one, which does not obey the form, cannot be considered sijo." This has left modern sijo at a divide between those who choose to honor the strictness of fixed form sijo and those who believe an adaptive free-form version of the poetic genre may still be acceptable as traditional works. Despite the fact that early forms, such as p'yŏng sijo, were not as widely written and recorded, they would still follow a 3-4-3-4, 3-4-3-4, 3-5-4-3 rhythmic structure. This made them strong and strict forms of poetry that only skilled artists would be able to remember and recite. This is changed in modern sijo. Since modern sijo is first written and not as spread through word of mouth, its structure has become much more lenient and differs in its shape across different authors.

하룻밤 안동 시내 골목술집 구경하고
머리가 삥삥돌때 밭둑길을 거닐다가
도야지 꿀꿀 소리야 이제 왔노 하노라

— David McCann, from Urban Temple, 2010
Translation:

One night in Andong
after a tour of back-alley wine shops,
head spinning, I staggered down
the narrow, paddy-field paths,
when the two pigs grunted,
"So, you! Home at last?"

== Early sijo in the Goryeo dynasty ==
Although sijo gained much of its popularity in the Joseon dynasty, the roots of the sijo are attributed to the late Goryeo dynasty. In fact, the earliest existing sijo was found to have been written towards the end of the 14th century as Confucian scholars sought to overcome the existing Buddhist-dominated literary, music, and art forms. As a result, there are important differences between the sijo written at the end of the Goryeo dynasty and those written in the Joseon dynasty. The sijo of the times, mostly written by men of elite status, are very reflective of the contemporary politics; thus, to understand the importance of the themes of Goryeo dynasty sijo, it is important to understand the political climate surrounding the poetry.

Much of the Goryeo dynasty was plagued with political strife. In 1170, the military aristocracy seized power from the civil aristocracy. Instability reigned in the government and the countryside for the next 25 years as military leaders plotted against each other and peasants rebelled against landowners and local officers. It was not until 1196 that things stabilized, when Ch'oe Ch'ung-hŏn seized power and established the rule of the Ch'oe family. Much of his power came from the parallel government he created, which was based on house institutions under his direct control staffed with people personally loyal to him. He also made effective use of mun'gaek, private military retainers of great clans.

Korea then endured repeated Mongol invasions from 1217 to 1258, and from 1270 to 1356, Korea was under Mongol domination. After Korea was liberated from Mongol control, there were still political conflicts on all sides of Goryeo. Goryeo was consistently under attack from Japanese pirates and Yuan refugees and faced two invasions from the Red Turbans. Finally, the Goryeo dynasty ended when Yi Sŏng-gye rose to power, proclaiming himself as King Taejo and renaming the state as the Joseon. This transition was quite violent and unstable, as the crown princes and members of the Wang royal house were reinstated only to be purged, and two factions arose towards the later Goryeo era – one whose loyalty to the existing regime continued, another whose loyalty shifted towards the new movement of the Joseon.

It was this incident for which the sijo poems of the late Goryeo are most well-known. The most prevalent theme of this era is loyalty to a lost cause, arising as a reaction to the rise of the new Joseon dynasty as the most powerful groups of the period struggled with where their loyalties lay. However, exacerbating the situation were the simultaneous struggles of China's Sung dynasty and the ascending Ming dynasty, further conflicting the people's loyalties. Thus, the ensuing confusion and chaos of the times gave way to themes of strong emotions such as regret over aging and sorrow over love, as many sought to express their mixed, complicated thoughts and harken back to the time of peace and stability.

One of the most famous sijo poems that demonstrates such political upheavals and tensions of the period is Chŏng Mong-ju's sijo, seen below, with the English translation:

Though this frame should die and die,
though I die a hundred times,
My bleached bones all turn to dust,
my very soul exist or not –
What can change the undivided heart
that glows with faith toward my lord?

Chŏng, a great scholar of the time referred to as P'oŭn, supposedly wrote this poem in response to Yi Sŏng-gye's son's (Yi Pang-wŏn) suggestion to defect and join the growing Joseon movement. The very idea that one's "undivided heart" remains loyal to the same despite dying "a hundred times" and one's "bleached bones all turn(ing) to dust" clearly exhibits the overall sense of honor, integrity, and fidelity that is emblematic of this generation's sijo poetry. In fact, this poem has become one of the prototypical examples of loyalty in Korea, even possibly one of the best known of all Korean sijo poems among Koreans. Today, this sijo (Dansimga - 단심가) has become to be known as the "Song of a Loyal Heart," or the "Tansim ka."

When black birds fight in the dale, the pure white bird must not go there.

Angry birds deep black at heart yet shine like white, beware of them!

In clear streams, the cleanest body, once it gets stained, stays unwashed.

정몽주의 어머님 The Mother of Chŏng Mong-ju

--- From A Lone Flute Resounds, 2015, translations recomposed in English from Korean by Kim Goeng Pil

== Proliferation and expansion of the form in the Joseon dynasty ==
Although sijo can be considered to originate in the Goryeo dynasty, it was during the Joseon dynasty that the form gained immense popularity. In the early years of the Joseon dynasty, sijo first became popular among yangban and the ruling class. These poems, like other literature of the time, were written in Literary Chinese. Many early sijo used language which emphasised social hierarchy. Because literacy in Chinese was largely restricted to upper classes, these early sijo were not accessible to most commoners. Although Korean poetry had its origins in song, sijo poetry of the early Joseon dynasty was distinct from sijo-chang (sijo in song form)

The development of the hangul writing system in the 15th century provided greater opportunity for people outside the elite scholarly classes to engage with written literature. Kisaeng, highly-educated female entertainers with an unusual social position, became associated with the sijo form. Their sijo were known to be particularly original, candid, and affecting.

The latter half of the Joseon era marked several important evolutions in sijo. Sijo spread beyond the yangban and kisaeng, and were now available, created, and performed by the general Korean public. More poems outside of Confucian ideals and hierarchy were being written and performed. This led to the development of different forms of sijo such as sasol sijo ("chatty" or "narrative" sijo), ossijo ("slightly altered sijo"), and yon sijo. The themes of sijo expanded and included more than just the narrative of the upper class.

Up until the end of the Joseon dynasty, this form of poetry did not have a distinct name. Instead, what are now called sijo were understood at the time to be songs and were named to signify the type of song. For example, songs might be called sijoelga or sijeoldanga depending on context. In the 19th century, a movement for the restoration of sijo began. Activists involved in the movement took the first part of the word sijo chang, a term referring to a traditional narrative song with a restricted form, to define the literary poetic genre.

== Sijo chang ==
Sijo emerged in the late Goryeo Period as a performing art and eventually gained popularity through the Joseon period. Initially, it spread amongst the yangban, or upper class, and later amongst the commoners. Sijo was passed down as an oral tradition during this period as a means to preserve the art form. While sijo encompasses a wide variety of traditional Korean poetry, one specific variation that derives from it is known as sijo chang. One of the most significant differences when comparing standard sijo with sijo chang is the presence of musical instruments. Sijo chang poetry employs the use of various Korean instruments to accompany the vocalist reciting the poem.

Sijo chang is known as "short song" because it has slow tunes with long, drawn-out ending pronunciation. For this reason it may also be called "the slowest song in the world". It demands a high level of ability and coordination between drummer and performer in order to keep the song flowing well. Throughout each sijo, the singer employs practiced techniques, such as vibrato and pitch changes.

The singer is accompanied by the daegeum (bamboo flute) and the janggu (hour-glass shaped drum). The singer uses a wide range of vibrato in addition to pitch changes. All sijo chang are sung in a very deliberate pace. The singer must be trained to extend the notes of the song for effect. Other instruments are used as the background musical support to keep the flow. For instance, the piri (bamboo oboe), daegeum (transverse flute), danso (vertical flute), and haegeum (two-fiddle zither) may also be used to accompany the vocalist. Although a wide variety of instruments may be used as an accompaniment to the sijo chang vocalist, not all may be used at one time. In more informal settings the janggu may be used as the sole instrument. Oftentimes, the sound of hitting one's lap may also serve as the only instrumental accompaniment.

== Similarities with Tang poetry in themes and expression of emotion ==
There are many similarities between Korean sijo poetry and Chinese Tang poetry: the reason that people wrote poems, the messages that they want to deliver, and how they express their feelings by talking about natural things. The following passage shows the translation of Kwon Homun's "The Wind is Pure and Clear" (바람은 절로 맑고):

The wind is pure and clear, the moon is pure and bright.
The bamboo grove within the pines [or The pine veranda in the bamboo garden] is pure of worldly cares.
But a lute and piles of scrolls can make it purer still.

There are only wind, moon, pine, lute and books in the poem. However, Kwon Homun used these to paint a world of himself that he dreams of. For him, a simple life like this is enough, but even this seemly simple life is hard for him to realize. Similarly, Chinese poets in the Tang dynasty also wrote poems in this way and for this reason. Here is the translation of Li Bai's "At the Yellow Crane Tower to Bid Meng Haoran Bon Voyage" (黄鹤楼送孟浩然之广陵):

At the tower of yellow crane, my friend, to the west, you said goodbye,
In this misty, flowery early spring, for Yangzhou downstream, you ply.
A speck, a silhouette is your lonely sail, to the verdant receding, till
In my eyes, there is only the long, Long River, rolling to the verge of the sky.

On the surface, this poem is about the view and the landscape that Li Bai saw while he was in the tower of yellow crane superficially, but it actually expresses the deep feeling of Li Bai when he was still gazing at the river even though his friend Meng Haoran has left. The first line gives readers the background and the second line constructs a confused and sorrowful air. In the last two lines, it describes how Li Bai gazed after Meng Haoran and how he felt, metaphorizing his feelings as the Long River.

By comparing the meanings of these two poems, we know that both Korean sijo and Chinese Tang poetry often employ natural objects such as landscape, pines, bamboo, plants and flowers in order to express human emotions.

== Yangban Sijo Themes ==
Sijo, across different social classes and historical contexts, engages with a wide range of themes, including nature, love, longing, and political reflection, often expressed in a direct and personal manner. However, yangban sijo, which developed within the Confucian intellectual culture of the Joseon dynasty, reflects a more distinct and consistent pattern of themes shaped by Neo-Confucian ideology. As a literary form, sijo was not merely an artistic expression but also a way to engage in moral reflection and self-cultivation, functioning as "a vehicle for the expression of Confucian ideals" ("About Sijo"). Common themes, which can be seen across works by yangban poets, such as Yang Sa Eun (양사언), Yi Gae (이개), and Song Si Yeol (송시열), include loyalty and political allegiance, moral integrity, and introspective self-examination, all shaped by Confucian ethical values. Among these themes, loyalty, particularly loyalty to the ruler, rooted in the Confucian ruler–subject relationship, emerges as one of the most prominent and enduring concerns.

An example of a Neo-Confucian-themed sijo is translated by Rutt and reads: By moonlight I sit all alone in the lookout on Hansan isle. My sword is on my thigh, I am submerged in deep despair. From somewhere the shrill note of a pipe… will it sever my heartstrings? Yi Sunsin (1545-1599) Written by an Admiral of the Korean military during the Imjin War, Yi Sunsin writes about the struggle of staying loyal to Joseon Korea, whilst combating a violent Japanese army (McCann). Utilizing poetry as an outlet, Admiral Yi uses several symbols to portray his loyalty to the Korean dynasty: moonlight symbolizing longing and reflection, sword on thigh symbolizing readiness and responsibility, and the shrill pipe symbolizing the melancholy of parting. Yi Sunsin yearned for a life in Korea with his family, yet he had left that behind in pursuit of peace for the rest of the country; this gesture reflects the religious influences during this time of Joseon Korea, where loyalty is among the most valued and followed traits in people. His poetry would exude an air of longing and hope to return home safely and soundly, a common theme for sijo poems written during the Imjin Wars.

This emphasis on loyalty cannot be reduced to a mere topic. Instead, it must be situated within the broader Neo-Confucian system that structured Joseon society. Within this system, the yangban functioned as scholar-officials whose moral cultivation was directly tied to their political commitments, meaning that loyalty to the ruler was treated as a fundamental ethical responsibility rather than a personal choice. Education, self-discipline, and service were all oriented toward upholding this relationship, as individuals were expected to cultivate virtue to properly serve the king, the state, and the people. As Leighanne Yuh explains, "emphasis on moral principles as the prerequisite for 'educated officials' was of course predicated on loyalty to the king as a primary Confucian virtue, and loyalty to the king was equivalent to love for one's country" (196-197). In this context, loyalty (충) is not simply an emotional or personal expression, but a structural principle that defines both political identity and social order. As a result, its prominence in yangban sijo reflects the internalization of Neo-Confucian values, in which poetry becomes a space for articulating duty, hierarchy, and moral responsibility rather than individual feeling alone.

"About Sijo." The Sejong Culture Society, www.sejongsociety.org/korean_theme/sijo/sijo_more.html.

McCann, David. “The Sijo: A Window into Korean Culture.” Association for Asian Studies, 2010. https://www.asianstudies.org/publications/eaa/archives/the-sijo-a-window-into-korean-culture/.

Yuh, Leighanne. "Loyalty to the King and Love for Country: Confucian Traditions, Western-Style Learning, and the Evolution of Early Modern Korean Education, 1895–1910." Sungkyun Journal of East Asian Studies, vol. 19, no. 2, Oct. 2019, pp. 189–212. Duke University Press.

== Authors ==
=== Kisaeng ===
The Kisaeng were women who functioned as professional entertainers, performing artists, and courtesans. These women were selected at a young age from the lower class for their beauty and talents; then trained to work for the government performing-arts bureaucracy. Their presence as poets that contributed to the art of sijo is notable due to their position as lower class women. They were considered barely above beggars due to their association with prostitution. Since the Joseon period was heavily influenced by Confucianist ideals, social stratification was heavily enforced. Kisaeng's ability to create artwork admired by the yangban—upper class men—was remarkable.

Many scholars note that the sijos written by kisaeng contain "a rare blend of emotional freedom, ironic perspective, and technical mastery" because they were free of the shackles of societal expectations. Their lower class standing released them from having to conform to themes of nature or filial piety. Therefore, despite the fact that the number of kisaeng authored sijo is unknown, their work is heavily associated with love poetry. Hwang Jini is one of the most notable kisaeng poets along with Yi Maechang.

Winter moon, your longest night, I shall snip out your long cold waist.

Spring breeze flee beneath my quilt, put round and round, I keep your warmth!

So the day my old love comes chilled, I spread warm folds through the night.

황진이 Hwang Jin Yi (?-1530, gisaeng)

Raining down pear blossoms there will come and catch my leaving love!

Autumn winds now dropping leaves, I also think about that day?

Far away, lonely dreams only go back and forth since he left.

이매창 Yi Mae Chang (1513-1550, gisaeng)

--- From A Lone Flute Resounds, 2015, translations recomposed in English from Korean by Kim Goeng Pil

==== In film ====
The title of the 2016 film Love, Lies in English refers to a famous sijo:

사랑 거즛말이 님 날사랑 거즛말이

꿈에 뵌닷 말이 긔 더욱 거즛말이

날가치 잠 아니 오면 어늬 꿈에 뵈리오

Translation:

"Love." It is a lying word.
That you love me, another lie.
"The loved one is seen in dreams."
That is still a greater lie,
How can I, who can never sleep,
hope to see you in my dreams?

This follows the "classic format" of the three line structure and love-longing content. The title of the film literally means 'flowers that understand words', which refers to a kisaeng's ability to understand the desire or need of men. The film gives clear facts on the connection between sijo and kisaeng. It also shows how kisaengs train from a very young age, and how they performed sijo chang.

Hwang Jin Yi, a 2007 film, gives an introduction to the well-known kisaeng Hwang Jin Yi, and her legendary life. The film shows much about kisaeng. Also, in these films, there is clear description of the well-educated kisaengs' accomplishments in literature. As one of the two classes who contributed to the composition the sijo poems, kisaeng also left numerous memorable sijo poems.

=== Kim Chŏnt'aek ===
Kim Chŏnt'aek was a prolific writer of sijo poetry and a famous singer. Scholars are almost certain that he was born in the late 1680s. In 1728 he created the first of the great sijo anthologies, 청구영언(靑丘永言), "Chanted Words of the Green Hills." It is one of the oldest surviving sijo anthologies. Kim Chŏnt'aek was considered the best singer musician in the country. Kim Chŏnt'aek did well in music, but he had also mastered the art of poetry. In particular, he composed sijo about the conflict between ranks in society, informed by his own middle-class perspective. He also wrote around thirty sijo with themes of nature, with subjects such as rivers and mountains.

One of Kim Chŏnt'aek's poems is as follows:

흰구름 푸른 내는 골골이 잠겼는데

추풍에 물든 단풍 봄꽃도곤 더 좋왜라

천공이 나를 위하여 뫼빛을 꾸며내도다

The blue hazy mountain sees from far away

Autumn leaves are more beautiful than spring flowers

God creates a colorful mountain for me.

This work can be seen as being based on the sense of pleasure and satisfaction of bringing nature into one's own world. While taking advantage of the harmonious colorful beauty of the two colors, the poet glorifies the feeling of being immersed in the beauty of nature. In reading, one can feel relaxed and assimilated into the natural space of the world as a spiritual object.

Kim Chŏnt'aek's significance in Korean literature can be seen through Confucian compilations of poetry collections. He had great achievements in the world of literature and sijo. First, Kim Chŏnt'aek helped to transfer the lead role in writing sijo from the scholar yangban class to the commoners. Second, his compilation 청구영언 is notable, not only because Kim Chŏnt'aek was not a yangban, but because it was one of the first sijo compilations. Finally, his vigorous creativity helped contribute to the development and cultivation of a new generation of sijo poems. Additionally, Kim Chŏnt'aek recognized the Korean written language (한글). While he used Chinese characters in creating the 청구영언 and in his works commenting on other poems, he did not use them extensively in his usual verses.

== Sasol sijo ==
The sasol sijo, an expanded form of the pyeong sijo that originated in the Goryeo dynasty, became popular in the 18th century. The word sasol means "close-stitched" or "closely set" and sasol sijo simply means "chatty" or "narrative" sijo. Sasol sijo loosely observed the basic format of sijo: fifteen-syllable lines for the first, second, and last lines. However, its middle section was expanded by adding additional phrases. During this time, most writers of sasol sijo took an interest in the life of the commoners. The writers of sasol sijo include women, yangban, chungin (the upper-middle class), and commoners. The authors tended to write in a manner that was more down to earth, and often rough and comical. Due to the themes relating to a commoner's ordinary life, most of the writers of sasol sijo remained anonymous. There has been speculation made about their anonymity, which could possibly be because of their humbleness to not have their names remembered. Furthermore, sasol sijo is significant in terms of how it changed the structure of sijo. However, it is not a form that is still used today.

Themes varied between pyeong sijo and sasol sijo. As pyeong sijo was created in the Goryeo dynasty (918–1392), many Buddhist values could be seen in early pyeong sijo. Then, in the Joseon dynasty (1392–1910), the upper class in Korea upheld Confucian values. Meanwhile, sasol sijo was written about common life and didn't uphold the expectations of Confucianism. There was an increase in the number of works focusing on love, whether that was carnal love, love-sickness, etc. Traditional pyeong sijo avoided discussing sex or love in this manner. Additionally, sasol sijo tended to include sarcasm, humor, and rough language associated with the common people.

While themes differ between sasol sijo and pyeong sijo, the most obvious difference between the two is their structure. Like pyeong sijo, sasol sijo consists of three lines, where the first line introduces the topic, the second line expands on the topic, and the third line provides a twist or a neat conclusion. In sasol sijo, the first and second lines are much longer than the three lines in regular sijo. If only one line of sijo is expanded, it is called os sijo meaning "slightly altered sijo". More than one line expanded is sasol sijo and usually, the last line maintains the original structure of the last line in pyeong sijo and begins with a 3-syllable unit. Not having a fixed limit to the length of the sasol sijo meant that it is the content that directs the form and not the form that directs the content. This allows an unruly play of words and images. Below is an example of sasol sijo:

모란은 화중왕(花中王)이요 향일화(向日花)는 충신(忠臣)이로다

연화(蓮花)는 군자(君子)요 행화(杏花)는 소인(小人)이라 국화는 은일사(隱逸士)요 매화는 한사(寒士)로다 박꽃은 노인이요 석죽화(石竹花)는 소년이라 규화(葵花)는 무당이요 해당화는 창녀(娼女)로다

이 중에 이화(李花)는 시객(詩客)이요 홍도벽도(紅桃碧桃) 삼색도(三色桃)는 풍류랑(風流郞)인가 하노라

— Kim Soojang (김수장; 金壽長; 1690~?)
Translation:

The peony is the king of flower and the sunflower a noble subject;

The lotus is a gentleman, the apricot blossom a commoner; the chrysanthemum a sag in retirement; the plum blossom a poor scholar; the gourd flower is and old, old man; the China pink is a boy; the mallow is a witch and the wild rose a harlot;

Among them the pear blossom is a poet, and are not the red peach, the green peach, and the peach of three colors, all of them playboys?

— Richard Rutt

== Comparison of Sijo and Pansori ==
Sijo is often compared to pansori due to the similarities of their performances. While there are similar characteristics in the performances and values, both of these artistic forms are very distinct in their origin and structure. Sijo has different variations but when comparing it with pansori it is best to compare sijo-chang and saseol sijo. Thematically, the two styles have shared elements, but also different distinguishing features. Traditionally, sijo was known for its themes that were centered around Confucian moral values. Sijo often wrote about loyalty, filial piety, friendship, relationships, and inner personal reflection. Similarly, pansori also used many of these themes, but executed them in a different way. Pansori explored emotions relating to sorrow, love, and longing, many of which were also found in sijo. As time progressed, sijo developed and became more narrative-based (saseol sijo). Pansori was known for its storytelling so with the emergence of saseol sijo, the content for both shifted to the mundaneness of everyday life, struggles, and a more realistic depiction of what was present. Although there are similarities in themes, the progression of sijo and pansori differed. Sijo began as a poetic form for elite, yangban, men, then spread to kisaengs, and finally the "looser" style of narrative sijo. On the other hand, pansori started from shamans and the lower class performing stories that taught moral lessons with a "looser" range of 12 themes. These performances caught the eye of the upper class who favored 5 themes in that they deemed morally acceptable with Confucian teachings. The pansori that the yangban enjoyed are Chunhyangga (teaches love and woman's chastity), Simcheongga (teaches filial love and piety), Heungboga (teaches about the effects of human greed), Sugungga (teaches about the conflict between ruler and subjects), and Jeokbyeokga (teaches about the loyalty of friends). Throughout the rise of sijo and pansori similar themes can be seen, but their thematic choices changed differently over time.

Sijo-chang is the performance of sijo where a mixture of chanting, singing, and drumming are used to captivate the listener. Pansori is a storytelling performance that also incorporates chanting, singing, and drumming, however unlike sijo which is three lines long, pansori performances can last as long as 3 hours. In both of these performances, the importance of the connection between the singer and the drummer can determine the outcome. Unlike traditional modern musical styles where the instruments lead the singer, sijo and pansori are led by the singer. The singer controls the tempo of the songs through their breaths, tone, and accents. When pansori was first created it was a shamanic tradition that was used to tell folk tales, with this, the vocal skills were not as important as they later became. In the 19th century, the upper class began to show interest in pansori, this is when the vocal skills of the performers began to increase and use similar techniques found in sijo. Both performances emphasize the tones used throughout the songs and frequently use accented notes to aid in the movement of the song. When it comes to the use of tone, sijo uses vibrato to create elongated notes with dynamic movement while pansori uses tonal differences to simulate multiple characters from one voice. In addition to the structure of sijo and pansori being different, their content also varied. A main theme of sijo was personal reflection by writing about one's inner musings and thoughts. Contrastingly, pansori was a narrative-based style of content which included themes of longing, love, complainings, sex, etc. A main differing point for pansori is that it was known to be "looser". Rather than writing about Confucian moral values as sijo did, pansori wrote about daily struggles and real-life occurrences. Sijo did remain as a primarily literary and poetic form, eventually becoming more narrative-based with the emergence of saseol sijo. However, pansori evolved to become a performance-based art form. As time progressed, pansori went beyond its original structure and broke into theater, music, and film. Both sijo and pansori underwent changes, but sijo's changes were mainly structure and thematic-based, while pansori's changes were more visible because of its presence in the media and adaptation in performance settings.

Sijo and pansori are both rooted in Korean culture, however there has been a large decrease in both artistic forms starting from the late 20th century. Although these traditions are not as prevalent as they once were, there are groups of people continuing to create sijo and pansori. An example of this is the South Korean group sEODo Band, who creates what they call "Joseon Pop" by using Pop sounds with traditional Korean instruments and vocal skills. The main vocalist of this band trained to sing pansori and during live performances the band incorporates traditional instruments to captivate the viewers. The lyrics of sEODo Band's song have similar themes as both sijo and pansori through their emotional reflection and the use of images of nature. The themes of sijo often used nature imagery to build a setting and typically showed the personal reflection by writing about internal feelings. While sijo influenced pansori's musicality and structure, it also held a strong influence on the themes, storytelling elements, and helped establish a stronger narrative style. Sijo often included thoughts of moral reflections, relationships, and human emotions, many of which were built on by pansori in a dramatisized way that was shown through performances. Once sijo, eventually saseol sijo shifted from a primarily yangban audience, the content aligned more with pansori which held a focus on common people and everyday life. Thematically, sijo set a strong foundation for pansori, but pansori used that foundation to create story-telling through performances. Saseol sijo became the narrative and "looser" style of sijo which is why a lot of the elements overlapped. Since saseol sijo used humor, dialogue, exaggeration, and drama in the, pansori used these elements and made it its own. Pansori developed the foundation that sijo gave for the narrative and literary style to create something that can be highlighted through performance and storytelling.

== Modern sijo ==
=== Emergence of modern sijo ===
There are two established developments of sijo: before 1876 and after. Before 1876 was when traditional sijo was prevalent and after 1876 modern sijo was "so-called" created (p. 25). Sijo is a genre of short Korean poems with a strictly defined structure reflecting the rhythm of a traditional Korean song known as pansori. It originated from Korea in the Koryŏ dynasty which began to flourish in the Joseon dynasty. Established with the Confucian ideology, sijo became the most popular type of poetry among the ruling Confucian scholars and noblemen. During the time, sijo was sung and recorded by word of mouth or transcribed. Sijo is an official name of the genre of poems, which came to be in the period of modernism; especially after a movement for the restoration of sijo that became active in the 19th century. The activists of the movement copied the first part of the name of the music sijo chang as the term to reference the poetry as it did not previously have a name.

=== Structure and comparison to traditional sijo ===
Modern sijo is a further developed upon and expanded category of Korean vernacular poetry also known as sijo. The original style that was developed and used prior to the 20th century is referred to as p'yŏng sijo. This new style first emerged during 'The open-door period' (개화기) (1876) and continued on to flourish during The Empire of Korea (1897–1910), Japanese Colonial Period (1910–1945), and even still is written today. It refers only to the written form. Modern sijo is generally structured the same as p'yŏng sijo with three line poems consisting of various amounts of syllables per foot. However, there are still several key differences between the two. The first being that modern sijo all have titles whereas none of the p'yŏng sijo did. Also given that sijo creation and literature in general was exclusive to the yangban class, p'yŏng sijo often used a lot of references to Chinese classics as well as focusing on the rhythm that it would be sung to as they were originally songs that were written down later on. Modern sijo was the product of literature becoming more widespread and available to the populace so it became filled with more wit, humor, and everyday life experiences. The rhythm also was not fixed as they were not focused on the performance aspect as it originally was. Instead of using Chinese characters or references to Tang dynasty classics, more colloquial language became the norm. Also, the above-mentioned structure of three lines generally stayed the same, rather than just writing one standalone sijo, modern sijo can go on for much longer and in most cases often does so. On top of this, although there was never a standard syllable count for p'yŏng sijo, in general each foot seem to be shorter than those in modern sijo. Overall, modern sijo became more free in style and departed in many ways from p'yŏng sijo.

=== Writers ===
- Choe Nam-sŏn (최남선) who created the first book of modern sijo titled '백팔번뇌' or the '108 Worldly Desires' in 1926. Not only was he a poet, he also published magazines during Japanese occupation to educate the young people. "In the mid-1920s to mid-1930s, he traveled across the homeland from Mount Paekdu down to Mount Chiri and sailed to Cheju Island, expressing his love to all the mountains and rivers and composing Sijo poems for Donga Ilbo along with his travelogues. He also compiled all Hyangga, Gasa and Sijo poems from the Three Kingdoms to Koyro and down to the Joseon Dynasties" (The Korea Times).
- Yi Kwang-su (이광수) was a Korean writer as well as independence and nationalist activist. His pennames included both Chunwon and Goju.
- Jeong Inpo (정인보) was a Korean scholar, historian, journalist, politician and writer during the Japanese colonial era.
- Yi Eunsang (이은상) is a South Korean poet, historian and holds a doctorate in literature. He is also the author of "노산 시조집".
- Yi Byeonggi (이병기) is regarded as one of the founders and writers of sijo.
- Yi Hou (이호우) was a South Korean poet and journalist and was most known for his emotional reserve and concern with reality as he wrote about rural life and its simplicity and beauty.

=== Examples ===
난초

빼어난 가는 잎새 굳은 듯 보드랍고
자줏빛 굵은 대공 하얀한 꽃이 벌고
이슬은 구슬이 되어 마디마디 달렸다
본래 그 마음은 깨끗함을 즐겨 하여
정한 모래 틈에 뿌리를 서려 두고
미진도 가까이 않고 우로 받아 사느니라

— Yi Byeonggi (1891–1968)
Translation:

Orchid

Full sprays of slender leaves
Seem stiff, but are soft and supple;
The stocky purplish stalks
Put out plain white flowers;
And the dew, turned into glass beads,
Clings to every stem
Inside, its true heart
Delights in its purity;
It twists its roots deep down
Between grains of clean white sand;
Far away from the slightest grime
It lives on in the rain and the dew

— Richard Rutt (260)

This poem was written by Yi Byeonggi (1891–1968), a well-known author who encouraged the creation of sijo. His work is often referred to as "gentle". This poem, "Orchid", has a traditional moral approach about flowers and is maintained in a modern idiom (Rutt, 260). Yi Pyŏnggi was the father of sijo and came up with the three variants consisting of ossijo, sasol, and yon-sijo. He mentioned that sijo should convey modern life by the extension of the structure from the conventional single stanza to two or more.

그 눈물 고인 눈으로 순아 보질 말라

미움이 사랑을 앞선 이 각박한 거리에서

꽃같이 살아보자고 아아 살아보자고

이호우 시조 '바람 벌' 중

근심이 산이 되어 울멍줄멍 솟아 둘리고

물은 여울여울 눈물 받아 흐르는 나라

가서 내 살고 싶은 곳 거기는 또 내 죽어 묻힐 곳

이은상 시조 '가서 내 살고 싶은 곳'

그럴싸 그러한지 솔빛 벌써 더 푸르다

산골에 남은 눈이 다산 듯이 보이고녀

토담집 고치는 소리 별밭 아래 들려라

정인보 시조 '조춘 (早春)' 중

== Examples ==
Sijo, unlike some other East Asian poetic forms, frequently employs metaphors, puns, allusions and similar word play. Most poets follow these guidelines very closely although there are longer examples. An exemplar is this poem by Yun Sŏndo (1587–1671) :

Middle Korean	Modern Korean	Translation
내 벗이 몇인가 ᄒᆞ니 수석과 송죽이라	내 벗이 몇인가하니 수석과 송죽이라	You ask how many friends I have? Water and stone, bamboo and pine.
동산의 ᄃᆞᆯ오르니 긔더옥 반갑고야	동산에 달오르니 그 더욱 반갑도다	The moon rising over the eastern hill is a joyful comrade.
두어라 이다ᄉᆞᆺ밧긔 또더ᄒᆞ야 머엇ᄒᆞ리	두어라, 이 다섯 밖에 또 더해야 무엇하리	Besides these five companions, what other pleasure should I ask

Yun Sŏndo also wrote a famous collection of forty sijo of the changing seasons through the eyes of a fisherman. Following is the first verse from the Spring sequence; notice the added refrains in lines 2 and 4.

Sun lights up the hill behind, mist rises on the channel ahead.
Push the boat, push the boat!
The night tide has gone out, the morning tide is coming in.
Jigukchong, jigukchong, eosawa!
Untamed flowers along the shore reach out to the far village.

Either narrative or thematic, this lyric verse introduces a situation or problem in line 1, development (called a turn) in line 2, and a strong conclusion beginning with a surprise (a twist) in line 3, which resolves tensions or questions raised by the other lines and provides a memorable ending.

Where pure snow flakes melt
Dark clouds gather threatening
Where are the spring flowers abloom?
A lonely figure lost in the shadow
of sinking sun, I have no place to go.

— Yi Saek (1328–1395), on the decline of Goryeo Kingdom.

Korean poetry can be traced at least as far back as 17 BC with King Yuri's Song of Yellow Birds but its roots are in earlier Korean culture (op. cit., Rutt, 1998, "Introduction"). Sijo, Korea's favorite poetic genre, is often traced to Confucian monks of the eleventh century, but its roots, too, are in those earlier forms. One of its peaks occurred as late as the 16th and 17th centuries under the Joseon dynasty. One poem of the sijo genre is from the 14th century:

The spring breeze melted snow on the hills then quickly disappeared.
I wish I could borrow it briefly to blow over my hair
And melt away the aging frost forming now about my ears.

— U Tak (1262–1342)

Sijo is, first and foremost, a song. This lyric pattern gained popularity in royal courts amongst the yangban as a vehicle for religious or philosophical expression, but a parallel tradition arose among the commoners. Sijo were sung or chanted with musical accompaniment, and this tradition survives. The word originally referred only to the music, but it has come to be identified with the lyrics.

동지달 기나긴 밤을 한 허리를 버혀 내여
춘풍 이불 아래 서리허리 넣었다가
어른 님 오신 날 밤이여드란 구부구비 펴리라

— Hwang Jin-i (1522–1565)
A famous female Korean sijo poet who was also a kisaeng,
a professional entertainer.
Translation:

I will break the back of this long, midwinter night,
Folding it double, cold beneath my spring quilt,
That I may draw out the night, should my love return.

Note: The English adaptations of verses by Yun Sŏndo and U T'ak are by Larry Gross (op. cit.) The English adaptation of the verse by Hwang Jin-i is by David R. McCann (op. cit.); Some of the information on the origins of sijo are cited from The Bamboo Grove: An Introduction to Sijo, ed. Richard Rutt (U. of Michigan Press, 1998); Kichung Kim's An Introduction to Classical Korean Literature: From Hyangga to P'ansori; and Peter H. Lee.

== Contemporary sijo and English adoption ==
While sijo is a traditional form, it has experienced a contemporary revival, particularly in English. Organizations such as the Sejong Cultural Society have been instrumental in this expansion by hosting an annual Sijo Writing Competition that encourages the composition of new English sijo. The society's archives demonstrate that the form is actively practiced by a new generation of writers, adapting the structural elegance of the traditional Korean form to contemporary literary landscapes.

The following are examples of award-winning contemporary English sijo:

Rubik's Cube

I stare deep into the cube, the six colors all intertwined.
A puzzle that seems so simple, but with more states than grains of sand.
It taunts me, knowing it's possible, but that's all I need — possible.

— Lucas Pai (2026 Sejong Writing Competition, Pre-college Division winner)

Dad's Turn

The workday is done. Time to pick up my baby from daycare.
She comes toddling, wearing a poncho for a skirt and mismatched shoes.
Her teacher smiles at me and asks: Did Dad dress her this morning?

— Bonnie Tudor (2025 Sejong Writing Competition, Adult Division winner)

=== In English ===
In 1986 the journal Poet dedicated an issue to "classic" Korean sijo translated into English by Korean-American Kim Unsong (aka William Kim). This was followed by Kim's Classical Korean Poems (Sijo) in 1987, Sijo by Korean Poets in China, and Poems of Modern Sijo (a collection of his originals) in the mid-1990s. They found a devoted audience in American theWORDshop publisher Dr. Larry Gross and Canadian haiku poet Elizabeth St. Jacques. As a result, a volume of original English-language sijo (Around the Tree of Light) by St. Jacques appeared and soon after, Gross launched the first issue of Sijo West with St. Jacques as assistant editor. It was the world's first poetry journal dedicated to English-language sijo and caught on well with poets dedicated to haiku and other forms of Asian verse.

Sijo West folded in 1999 reportedly due to health problems and tragedies with Gross. St. Jacques reemerged with online postings known as Sijo Blossoms (circa 2001), which, apparently, has since evolved into the Sijo In The Light section of her Poetry In The Light website. Sijo In The Light, like the defunct Sijo West, featured original English-language sijo, as well as essays and reviews. Gross, meanwhile, has maintained a significant presence for sijo on his website Poetry in theWORDshop, which includes translations from Korean masters as well as original contributions by contemporary poets. Gross moderated a Yahoo! discussion group, sijoforum.

Urban Temple, a collection of sijo composed in English by the Harvard University Emeritus Professor David McCann is available from Bo-Leaf Books. Nominated for the Griffin Poetry Prize, this collection was praised by Jane Shore as "at once present and universal, contemporary and timeless ... a book well worth waiting for." Sijo: an international journal of poetry and song is published by the Cambridge Institute for the Study of Korea and volumes 1 and 2 are currently available. For Nirvana: 108 Zen Sijo Poems by Musan Cho Oh-Hyun was translated by Heinz Insu Fenkl and published by Columbia University Press in 2017. The page Sijo Poet on Facebook shares sijo composed in English as well as poems translated from Korean.

== Thematic evolution and international expansion ==
Contemporary sijo has seen a major shift in thematic focus from earlier works. Historically, sijo written by the elite yangban poets of the Joseon dynasty emphasized Confucian values such as loyalty and moral integrity, often using natural imagery as a basis for metaphor. In contrast, non-elite writers, particularly the gisaeng, explored personal themes like longing and emotional vulnerability.

Modern sijo frequently focuses on everyday experiences. For example, in her collection Tap Dancing on the Roof, Linda Sue Park uses the form to describe modern subjects like sports and food. Her poem "Tennis" utilizes musical imagery to describe the rhythmic exchange of a match, while "School Lunch" employs geometric descriptions to capture feelings of constraint and conformity.

== Influence on interdisciplinary arts ==
Contemporary sijo has been incorporated into other artistic disciplines, including the visual arts. In 2021, sculptor Andy Moerlein integrated sijo into his exhibition, wood stone poem, at the Boston Sculptors Gallery. Sponsored by the Korean Cultural Society of Boston, the exhibition featured a sijo competition in which participants composed poems in response to Moerlein's sculptures, which were modeled after traditional Korean scholar's stones (suseok).

The project paired physical artwork with submitted poetry, using selections from South Korean poet Min-jeong Kim's book, Someone Is Sitting, to provide structural examples of the form for English-language submissions. An example of the sijo featured in the exhibition materials is "Stone Blossoms, Azalea" (돌꽃, 진달래) by Min-jeong Kim:

Stone Blossoms, Azalea
Though it is not April yet, the air is laden with their scent.
A cluster of stars glitter under an armful of stamens.
The spring face still looks young and fresh, between bluish green stems.

「돌꽃, 진달래」 풍도
사월이 아니라도 꽃내음이 가득하다
한 아름 꽃술 아래 흐르는 별무더기
청록빛 줄기 사이로 지지 않는 봄 얼굴

— Min-jeong Kim

== See also ==
- For other examples
- Korean culture
- Korean poetry
- Hyangga

== References and further reading ==
- The Bamboo Grove: An Introduction to Sijo, ed. Richard Rutt, University of Michigan Press, 1998.
- Soaring Phoenixes and Prancing Dragons; A Historical Survey of Korean Classical Literature, by James Hoyt, Korean Studies Series No. 20, Jimoondang International, 2000.
- Master Sijo Poems from Korea: Classical and Modern, selected and translated by Jaihun Joyce Kim, Si-sa-yong-o-sa Publishers, Inc., 1982.
- An Introduction to Classical Korean Literature: From Hyangga to P'ansori by Kichung Kim, Armonk, N.Y.: M.E. Sharpe, 1996.
- Early Korean Literature, David R. McCann, ed., Columbia University Press, 2000.
- The Columbia Anthology of Traditional Korean Poetry, Peter H. Lee, editor, Columbia University Press, 2002.
- The Book of Korean Shijo, translated and edited by Kevin O'Rourke, Harvard East Asian Monographs 215, Harvard-Ewha Series on Korea, Harvard University Asia Center, 2002.
- Jeet Kune Do'nun Felsefesi, Yüksel Yılmaz, İstanbul, Turkey: Yalın Yayıncılık, (2008).
- For Nirvana: 108 Zen Sijo Poems,Musan Cho Oh-hyun, translated by Heinz Insu Fenkl, Columbia University Press, 2016.
- A Lone Flute Resounds: Korean Classical Sijo Poetry Translated into English, vol. 1, translated by Kim Goeng Pil, Guhbooksun Publishing, 2015.
