= Yi Maech'ang =

Korean court woman (1573–1610)

- Hangul: 이매창
- Hanja: 李梅窓
- RR: I Maechang
- MR: I Maech'ang

Alternate name
- Hangul: 이향금
- Hanja: 李香今
- RR: I Hyanggeum
- MR: I Hyanggŭm

Yi Maech'ang (Korean: 이매창; Hanja: 李梅窓; 1573–1610), born Yi Hyanggŭm (이향금; 李香今), was a famed kisaeng of the Buan area during the Joseon period. She was known by Maech'ang (매창; 梅窓), Kyesaeng (계생; 桂生; 癸生), and Kyerang (계랑; 桂娘; 癸娘).

== Biography ==
She was born to a man Yi T'angjong (이탕종; 李湯從) who was the mayor of Buan-hyeon (now Buan County) in North Jeolla Province, and an unnamed woman.

She was noted for her talent in playing the geomungo (a zither-like instrument) and composing sijo and other poetry. As Hwang Chini was known as one of the three wonders of Songdo, Maech'ang was known as one of the three wonders of Byeoksan. Because she was a kisaeng, she was not permitted to publish her works during her lifetime.

One line from her sijo remains, saying:

"Yi Hwa-woo, who broke up with me while crying

Do you think of me in the autumn leaves too?

A thousand miles away, only dreams come and go."

(이화우 흣뿌릴 제 울며 잡고 이별한 님.

추풍 낙엽에 저도 날 생각난가?

천리에 외로온 꿈만 오락가락 하노매)

Her grave is preserved in Buan County, North Jeolla Province, South Korea.
