= Lee Byeong-gi =

South Korean linguist (1891–1968)

- Hangul: 이병기
- Hanja: 李秉岐
- RR: I Byeonggi
- MR: I Pyŏnggi

Art name
- Hangul: 가람
- Hanja: 嘉藍
- RR: Garam
- MR: Karam

Yi Byeong-gi (Korean: 이병기; 1891–1968) studied Korean literature in Chinese, and then pursued the study of the Korean vernacular. His art name is Garam (Korean: 가람).

== Biography ==
Yi was born in 1891 in Iksan, Jeollabuk-do. He was a member the Korean Language Society, and in 1942 was arrested and imprisoned by the Japanese colonial authorities. Released September 1943, he worked on the family farm and pursued his studies. At the end of the Pacific War, he was employed by the occupation military government, and also at Seoul National University's College of Liberal Arts (1946–1950), where he taught Korean literature. Following the Korean War, he returned home to teach at Jeonbuk National University (retiring in 1956).

He opposed the Japanese colonial rule by promoting the use of the Korean alphabet (Hangul). He created the journal Munjang (Literary Style) where he promoted modern Korean poetry, but also serialized many classics like Hanjungnok (Feb. 1939-Jan. 1940) and Inhyeon syeongmo minsi deokhaengnok 63 jangbon (1940). As a member of the Korean Language Society, he was jailed in the Korean Language Society Incident by the Japanese colonial forces.

He is known for his sijo and for his work on both the Korean language and literature. In particular he wrote revitalised the writing of sijo, writing hundreds, and discussing the practice of sijo in many articles. His best known collection of sijo is Karam Sijo Chip (Karam's Sijo Collection), first published in 1939, during the Japanese colonial occupation, and then republished in 1947.

After the recovery of Korean Independence, he established the Garam Library in the Seoul National University. In addition to his sijo, he collected and wrote commentaries on Korean literature and on Korean history. Among these are Hanjungnok, and Inhyeon wanghu jeon, "Yolowonyahwagi" and "Chunhyangga".
