= Korean Language Society incident =

1942 incident in Japanese-occupied Korea

The Korean Language Society Incident (朝鮮語學會事件, Chōsengo gakkai jiken; Korean: 조선어학회 사건) refers to the arrest, torture, and imprisonment of members of the Korean Language Society which occurred in 1942 under the Japanese colonial rule of Korea.

== Description ==
In mid-1942, an investigation by the provincial police of Kankyōnan-dō led to the discovery of a female Korean high school student's diary. In her diary, she stated that she was punished at school for speaking Japanese, which led to the arrest of the teachers at her school. Consequently, in October 1942, Japanese police arrested members of the Korean Language Society in Keijō on charges of violating the Peace Preservation Law. Following torture, a confession was obtained that the Joseon Language Society was an organization dedicated to the independence of Korea from Japan. However, at that time, the society was engaged in researching the Joseon language, establishing spelling rules, and compiling a dictionary of the Korean language. Members did not engage in group activities that would violate the Peace Preservation Law.

In the late 1950s, Korean linguist Lee Hee-seung (李熙昇) left a memoir. In the early 1970s, a new 'memory' was created in celebration of the 25th anniversary of liberation and the 50th anniversary of the Korean Language Society. In particular, the happening at Chonjin station, which was the beginning of the incident, was reconstructed to fit the status of the Joseon Language Society.

== Laws leading to the event ==
- In 1936, the Japanese government in Korea passed the Chosun Ideological Crime Prevention Ordinance (조선사상범보호관찰령).
- In 1941, the Chosun Ideological Crime Prevention Ordinance was amended.
- In 1943, the 4th Joseon Education Ordinance policy abolished Korean language education, banned the use of Korean, and forced the use of Japanese.

And from April 1939, the Japanese government in Korea abolished Korean language subjects in schools and proceeded to close Korean language newspapers and magazines.

== Timeline ==
- In July 1942, Park Byeong-yeop was waiting for a friend at Chonjin station in Hongwon-eup, South Hamgyeong-do. He was questioned and taken into custody at the Hongwon Police Station. The Hongwon police searched his house, and the diary of Park Young-ok (his niece) was confiscated. This contained a phrase apparently showing that one of her teachers at Yeongsaeng High School 4 in Hamheung rejected the Japanese law to teach using only the Japanese language. Young-Ok Park and her friends Soon-Nam Choi, Soon-Ja Lee, Jeong Seong-Hee, In-Ja were arrested and interrogated. After enduring torture for several days, they finally incriminated two teachers, Kim Hak-joon and Jung Tae-jin, who had encouraged students to use Hangul, and had tried to inspire a sense of independence by telling stories such as the fall of Japanese imperialism, the revival of the Joseon people, and the story of the sacrifice of Gyewolhyang during the Japanese invasion of Korea in 1592. Both Kim Hak-joon and Jeong Tae-jin were members of the Korean Language Society.
- In September 1942, a student at Yeongsaeng Girls’ High School was arrested for talking in Korean by the Japanese police and interrogated.
- On 1 October 1942, the police, having concluded that the Korean Language Society was an independence movement group, began to arrest members, including: Lee Yun-jae, Choi Hyun-bae, Lee Hee-seung, Jeong In-seung, Kim Yoon-kyung, Kwon Seung-wook, Jang Ji-young. Eleven people, including Han Jing, Lee Jung-hwa, Lee Seok-rin, and Lee Geuk-ro, were arrested in Seoul and sent to Hongwon, Hamgyeongnam-do.
- On 18 October 1942, Lee Woo-sik and Kim Beop-rin were arrested.
- On 20 October 1942, Jeong Yeol-mo was arrested.
- On 21 October 1942, Lee Byeong-gi, Lee Man-gyu, Lee Kang-rae, and Kim Seon-ki were arrested
- On 23 December 1942, Seo Seung-hyo, Ahn Chai-hong, Lee In, Kim Yang-soo, Jang Hyeon-sik, Jeong In-seop, Yun Byeong-ho, Lee Eun-sang were arrested separately
- Kim Do-yeon (金度演) on 5 March 1943, and Seo Min-ho (徐珉濠) on next day, respectively, and all were detained at the Hongwon Police Station.
- From the end of March to 1 April, Hyeon-mo Shin and Jong-cheol Kim were interrogated without detention.
- Kwon Deok-gyu and Ahn Ho-sang escaped arrest due to illnesses,
- By the end of March 1943, 29 people had been arrested and sentenced to all sorts of barbaric punishments. They were severely tortured, and 48 people had been interrogated.
- Lee Yoon-jae, Han Jing died in prison, before completion of their trials.

== Arrests in the incident ==
Name	Sentence	Order of Merit for National Foundation	Year of award	Notes
Jeong Tae-jin	2 years imprisonment	Independence medal	1962	
Lee Geuk-ro	6 years imprisonment	–	–	North Korea
Lee Yun-jae	–	Independence medal	1962	died in prison while on trial
Choi Hyeon-bae	4 years imprisonment	Independence medal	1962	
Lee Hee-seung	2 years and 6 months imprisonment	Independence medal	1962	
Jeong In-seung	2 years imprisonment	independence medal	1962	
Kim Yun Kyong	postponement of prosecution	patriotic medal	1990	1 year imprisonment
Kwon Seung-wook	postponement of prosecution	–	–	
Jang Ji-yeong		patriotic medal	1990	1 year in prison
Han Jing	–	independence medal	1962	died in prison while on trial
Lee Jung-hwa (이중화)	2 years imprisonment, 4 years probation	national medal	2013	2 years imprisonment
Lee Seok-rin	postponement of prosecution	national medal	1990	1 year in prison
Lee Kang-rae	postponement of prosecution	national medal	1990	1 year imprisonment
Kim Seon-gi	postponement of prosecution	national medal	1990	1 year imprisonment
Lee Byeong-gi	postponement of prosecution	patriotic medal	1990	1 year imprisonment, released 1943
Lee Man-gyu	postponement of prosecution	–	–	Imprisoned for 1 year, lived in North Korea
Jeong Yeolmo	extinction of prosecution	–	–	Imprisoned for 1 year, lived in North Korea
Kim Beop-rin	2 years imprisonment, 4 years probation	independence medal	1995	2 years imprisonment
Lee Woo-sik	2 years imprisonment, 4 years probation	independence medal	1977	2 years imprisonment
Yoon Byeong-ho (尹炳浩,윤병호)	postponement of prosecution	national medal	1990	1 year imprisonment
Seo Seung-hyo	postponement of prosecution	–	–	
Kim Yang-su	2 years imprisonment, 4 years probation	patriotic medal	1990	2 years imprisonment
Hyunsik Jang (장현식)	innocence	patriotic medal	1990	Imprisonment for 4 years, abduction
Lee In	2 years imprisonment 4 years probation	independence medal	1963	2 years imprisonment
Lee Eun-sang	postponement of prosecution	patriotic medal	1990	1 year imprisonment
Jeong In-seop	1 year imprisonment	national medal	1990	
Ahn Chai-hong	non-prosecution	presidential medal	1989	2 years imprisonment
Kim Do-yeon	2 years imprisonment, 4 years probation	patriotic medal	1991	2 years imprisonment
Seo Min-ho	–	national medal	2001	1 year imprisonment
Shin Hyun-mo	postponement of prosecution	national medal	1990	
Kim Jong-cheol	postponement of prosecution	–	–	abroad
Kwon Deok-gyu	suspension of prosecution	patriotic medal	2019	ill
Ahn Ho-sang	suspension of prosecution	–	–	ill

== In popular culture ==
The 2019 South Korean movie, Mal-Mo-E: The Secret Mission, fictionalises the story of the creation of the first Hangul dictionary and the story of this incident of torture and imprisonment of key members of the Korean Language society, while apparently remaining close to the facts.
