= Lee Eun-sang (poet) =

South Korean poet (1903–1982)

- Born: October 22, 1903; Masan, Korea
- Died: September 18, 1982 (aged 78)
- Occupations: Poet, historian
- Writing career
- Language: Korean

Korean name
- Hangul: 이은상
- Hanja: 李殷相
- RR: I Eunsang
- MR: I Ŭnsang

Lee Eun-sang (Korean: 이은상; October 22, 1903 – September 18, 1982) was a Korean poet and historian. He was dedicated to the revival and modernization of sijo, a form of Korean poetry.

== Early life ==
Lee Eun-sang was born on October 22, 1903, at Sangnam-dong, Masan, Korean Empire. In 1918, he graduated from the Changshin High School (창신고등학교) which his father had established, and in 1923, he entered the department of liberal arts at Yonhee College, the predecessor of Yonsei University. He withdrew in 1923. He worked for Changshin School as a teacher for a time until he enrolled at Waseda University in Japan, majoring in history in 1925. He worked at Ewha Womans University as a professor from 1931 to 1932. After that, he worked for The Dong-a Ilbo and The Chosun Ilbo newspapers.

In 1942, he was arrested on the suspicion of being implicated in the Korean Language Society Incident, and was released the next year when his indictment was suspended. In 1945, he was detained in custody as a political offender at the Gwang-yang police station and was released at the time of independence from Japan.

After Korea's liberation from Japan, Lee taught at Cheong-gu University, Seoul National University, and Young-nam University. In 1954, he was invited to join the Korean Academy of the Arts, and by 1978 he had achieved a life-time membership in the Korean Academy of the Arts. Lee served as the chairman of the Admiral Lee Sun-sin Memorial Committee, a member of the Korea Alpinist's Association, the Korea Culture Preservation Association, and the People's Culture Association, as well as being Editor-in-Chief for the History of Korea Independence Movements.

In 1969, he was awarded the Presidential Prize, and in 1970, the National Medal of Honor, Republic of Korea, Mu-gung-hwa-jang The Medal of Rose of Sharon. Lee won the Rose of Sharon National Medal of Honor in 1970, and died in 1982.

== Works ==
In his childhood, Lee and his friends enjoyed playing near a stream close to his house on the hills of Mount No-bi-san. Whenever he visited Masan, his hometown, later in life, he went to the stream as it reminded him of his childhood. The poems Climbing Up the Old Hill and Symphony of Spring both depict the days when he played on the hill of Mount Nobisan. One of his motivations for writing poetry in the sijo form is that his father would recited it to him when he was a child.

In 1921, the poem Hyul-jo was published for the first time, in Ah-sung, volume 4, under the pen name Du-wu-seong.The Awards
