= Jungdong High School =

Boys' high school in Daegu, South Korea

- Daegu; South Korea

Information
- School type: High school
- Motto: 꿈을 가진 사람(理想), 공부하는 사람(努力), 행하는 사람(實踐) (A person with a dream, a person who studies, a person who acts)
- Established: 1981; 45 years ago
- Founder: Kim Jungsoo
- Gender: Boys

Jungdong High School is a high school for boys located in Daegu, South Korea.

== History ==
The school building (West building) was built on 30 November 1980, and the establishment of the school was approved on 15 January 1981 by founder 김정수 (Kim Jungsoo), and the opening ceremony was held on 5 March 1981. On 25 January 1983, the East building was built, and next year's February, the first graduation ceremony was held with 412 students. On 21 January 1998, the multimedia classroom was completed, and on 21 August 2009, the English classroom was completed.

== Symbols ==
The tree that symbolizes the school is the juniper. The tree is intended to symbolize the hope that the students will become people who make a clean and green society and contribute to social development. The school flower is the magnolia, which symbolizes the desire to become a person who is always able to love others.

== School Motto ==
꿈을 가진 사람(理想), 공부하는 사람(努力), 행하는 사람(實踐) (A person with a dream, a person who studies, a person who acts)
