= Story of So Hyeonseong =

17th-century Korean novel

Story of So Hyeonseong (Korean: 소현성록) is a 17th-century Korean novel from the late Joseon period. Scholars classify the work as a family saga that follows three generations of the So clan. The novel appears in many manuscript copies. This indicates active circulation in elite reading circles.

== Authorship ==
The author remains unknown. Surviving manuscripts show wide variation. Copyists altered wording and structure in different regions. Most scholars date the text to the mid-seventeenth century based on linguistic features and social references.

== Plot ==
The novel follows the rise of So Hyeonseong (소현성). The story presents his marriage to Lady Heo (허씨) and the trials of the So clan. The narrative expands into the lives of their descendants. The plot blends family loyalty, moral tests, and political pressure.

=== First Generation ===
So Hyeonseong gains recognition through moral conduct and strategic action in public life. His marriage to Lady Heo strengthens the clan. The couple confronts conflict with rival families, including the Andong Gwon clan (안동권씨). The narrative frames these struggles as lessons in virtue.

=== Second Generation ===
Their sons advance the So family line through examination success. The text highlights the Confucian ideal of filial duty. Characters face disputes over inheritance and alliance marriages. Each event reinforces the theme of moral testing.

=== Third Generation ===
The third generation completes the rise of the family. The final chapters show stability achieved through loyalty and scholarship. The story uses these outcomes to present a model lineage.

== Themes ==
The novel emphasizes Confucian duty. It presents family solidarity as a source of social power. The narrative also reflects the instability of the seventeenth century. Characters navigate political tension and clan rivalry. The text positions virtuous conduct as the only path to safety.

== Reception and Influence ==
The novel circulated among literati households. Manuscript diversity indicates steady copying through the nineteenth century. Modern scholars treat the work as an important example of family saga fiction. The genre shaped later narratives such as Hanjungnok and other women’s memoirs.
