= Chu Sigyŏng =

Korean linguist (1876–1914)

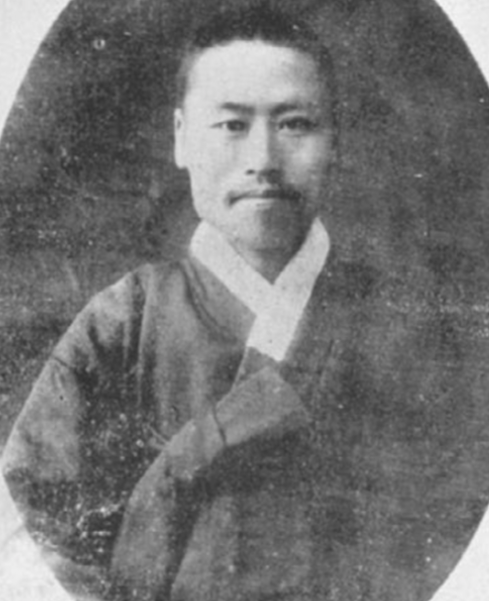
- Born: December 22, 1876; Pongsan-gun, Hwanghae Province, Joseon
- Died: July 27, 1914 (aged 37)
- Occupation: Linguist
- Known for: Early contributions to Korean linguistics, naming Hangul

Korean name
- Hangul: 주시경
- Hanja: 周時經
- RR: Ju Sigyeong
- MR: Chu Sigyŏng

Art name
- Hangul: 한힌샘, 한흰메
- RR: Hanhinsaem, Hanhuinme
- MR: Hanhinsaem, Hanhŭinme

Courtesy name
- Hangul: 상호
- Hanja: 相鎬
- RR: Sangho
- MR: Sangho

Chu Sigyŏng (Korean: 주시경; Hanja: 周時經; December 22, 1876 – July 27, 1914) was one of the founders of modern Korean linguistics. He was born in Pongsan-gun, Hwanghae Province in 1876. He helped to standardize the Korean language, based on the spelling and grammar of vernacular Korean.

== Biography ==
Chu Sigyŏng was born in Hwanghae Province, in what is now North Korea. He studied Classical Chinese from an early age. In 1887 he moved to Seoul and studied linguistics. In 1896, he found work in the first Hangeul-only newspaper, Dongnip Sinmun, founded by the Korean independence activist Seo Jae-pil. In 1897, Seo Jae-pil was sent into exile to the United States, and Chu Sigyŏng left the newspaper.

Interested in Western linguistics and teaching methods, Chu Sigyŏng served as a Korean instructor for the American missionary William B. Scranton, founder of today's Ewha Womans University.

== Standardizing Korean Language ==
Having realized the need of a standardized Korean alphabet, Chu Sigyŏng established the Korean Language System Society (조선문동식회; 朝鮮文同式會) in 1886 along with several of his colleagues. Chu also hosted several seminars in the National Language Discussion Centre of the Sangdong Youth Academy of the Korean language (상동청년학원국어강습소; 尚洞青年學院國語講習所).

Chu proposed that the Korean parts of speech include nouns, verbs, adjectives, adverbs, unconjugated adjectives (관형사; 冠形詞), auxiliaries (조사; 助詞), conjunctions, exclamations, and sentence-final particles (종지사; 終止詞). Chu Sigyŏng coined the name Hangul (한글) between 1910 and 1913 to identify the Korean writing system, which had previously existed under several other names, such as eonmun (언문, vernacular script), since the 15th century.

In his 1914 publication, Sounds of the Language (말의 소리), he promoted writing Hangul linearly such as ㅎㅏㄴㄱㅡㄹ (h-a-n-g-eu-l) rather than syllabically as 한글 (han-geul). This is one of his few proposals not to have been implemented in modern Korean linguistics, although there have been experiments with linear Hangul, most notably in Primorsky Krai.

== Publications ==
- The History of the Downfall of Vietnam (월남망국사; 越南亡國史) (1907)
- The National Language Classical Phonetics (국어문전음학; 國語文典音學) (1908) (based on his lecture notes)
- An Introduction to the Chinese Language (한문초습; 漢文初習) (1909)
- An Introduction to the National Language (국문초학; 國文初學) (1910)
- The Grammar of the National Language (국어문법; 國語文法) (1910)
- Sounds of the Language (말의 소리) (1914)

== See also ==
- Shinpei Ogura
- South Korean standard language
- North Korean standard language
