= Korean Language Society =

Society for Korean language research

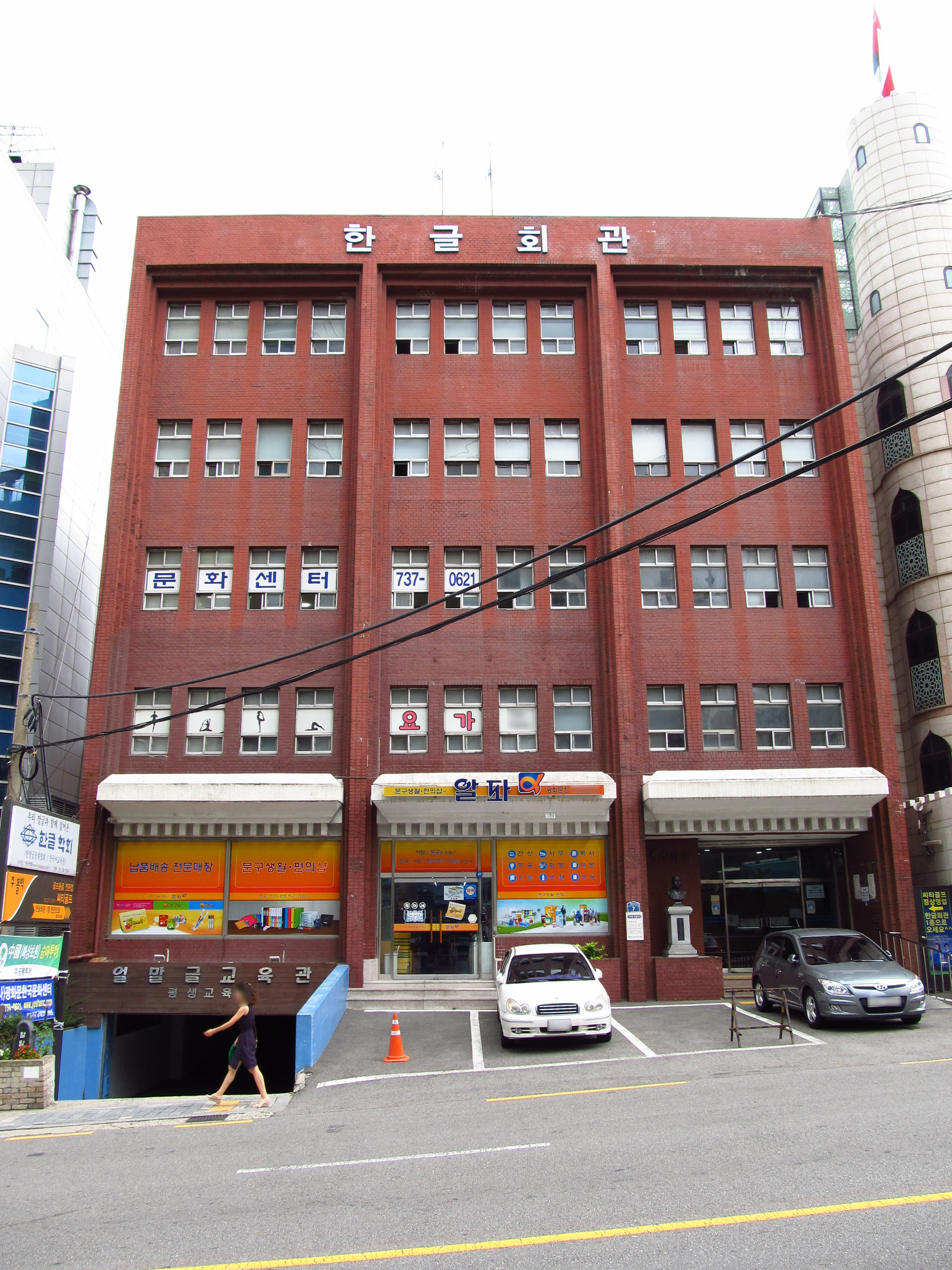
- The headquarters of Korean Language Society in Jongno District, Seoul, South Korea
- Established: 1908
- Website: hangeul.or.kr

Korean name
- Hangul: 한글 학회
- Hanja: 한글學會
- RR: Hangeul hakhoe
- MR: Han'gŭl hakhoe

The Korean Language Society (Korean: 한글 학회; formerly 조선어학회, Joseoneo Hakhoe) is a scholarly organization that studies and helps standardize the Korean language and its writing system, Hangul. Founded in 1908 by Ju Sigyeong, it promotes Hangul-exclusive writing.

The society was originally established as the Guk-eo Yeon-gu Hakhoe in 1908, became the Joseoneo Hakhoe in 1931, and adopted its current name, Hangul Hakhoe, in 1949. Its main achievements include the Unified Hangul Orthography (1933), the Collection of Assessed Standard Korean Words (1936), and the six-volume Great Korean Dictionary, completed in 1957.

During the Japanese occupation of Korea, members of the society founded Hangul Day in 1926 to preserve the Korean language amid rapid Japanization. Many of its early members were imprisoned and tortured in 1942 by Japanese imperial authorities.

== Background and foundation ==
Hangul was created in the 15th century, but Classical Chinese remained the main language of government and scholarly writing in Korea for centuries. As Korean-language newspapers, schools, and publishing became more common in the late 19th century, Koreans needed consistent spelling and writing rules.

The society began with the Guk-eo Yeon-gu Hakhoe (National Language Research Society), founded in 1908 under Ju Si-gyeong. After several changes, the group was revived in 1921 as the Joseoneo Yeon-guhoe (Korean Language Research Society) by scholars who followed Ju's work. It adopted the name Joseoneo Hakhoe in 1931.

In 1929, a project to create a large Korean dictionary began with 108 founding supporters. The project required not only collecting words, but also consistent spelling rules and shared guidelines for choosing and explaining words. These requirements guided the society's subsequent work on spelling, standard words, and the dictionary.

== Orthographic and vocabulary standardization (1933–1936) ==
The society aimed to create consistent spelling rules. A group of 18 scholars discussed proposals in 125 meetings over a total of 433 hours before the society published the Unified Hangul Orthography in October 1933. The main principle was to write Korean words according to their pronunciation while keeping their grammar clear. The rules also covered word spacing and used the speech of middle-class Seoul residents as a reference for standard Korean.

These spelling rules were based on pronunciation and grammar. For example, the spelling 꽃이 preserves the spelling of the noun 꽃 in letter even though the word is pronounced like 꼬치. Scholars also discussed whether to keep older spellings when pronunciation had changed, choosing forms such as 소년 over the older form, 쇼년. Other linguists disagreed with some of the society's spelling choices.

Choosing standard words also took careful review. The society formed a committee of 73 reviewers, who examined proposed words in three rounds. About half of them came from Seoul and Gyeonggi, while the rest came from other regions, allowing regional words to be considered. The society sent a nearly finished draft to around 500 educational, media, religious, and other groups and individuals for comments.

The Collection of Assessed Standard Korean Words (1936) included 6,231 standard forms and 3,082 nonstandard forms, as well as shortened forms and Sino-Korean words. A later study found differences in how the original totals were counted. These decisions gave the society a common set of rules to follow when making its dictionary.

== Dictionary compilation ==
Creating a large Korean-language dictionary was one of the society's main projects. At first, the Korean Dictionary Compilation Committee worked with the language research society. They divided the work between setting language rules and preparing the dictionary. In March 1936, the Korean Language Society took over the whole project.

=== Vocabulary collection and editorial process ===
Making the dictionary meant collecting and recording Korean words from many sources. Editors found words in books and other written materials, while experts added terms from their own fields. To collect everyday expressions and regional words, the society asked members, students, and people across Korea to help. This helped the editors collect words beyond those already found in published works.

The editors then reviewed the collected words and wrote definitions. They chose which words to use as dictionary entries, followed the agreed spelling rules, and explained what each word meant. By 1939, much of the word collection and definition writing was done, and the editors began preparing the manuscript for publication.

=== Financial and publication challenges ===
The project was highly dependent on private donations since raising regular funding was difficult. Because the work took longer than expected, the society often struggled with costs. More donations from supporters, especially Yi U-sik, allowed the projects to continue.

Publication also required approval from Japanese colonial authorities. In March 1940, the society submitted part of its manuscript and received permission to publish only if it removed or corrected certain content. The plan was for a dictionary with around 160,000 entries and 3,000 illustrations. By the summer of 1942, about 200 pages had been set in type and were being checked for errors.

For some of those involved, the dictionary was more than a language research project. Historian Park Yong-gyu writes that Yi Geuk-ro encouraged the editors to finish the dictionary so that future generations could preserve and revive the Korean language, even if its use was restricted under colonial rule. The project stopped before publication when society members were arrested in 1942.

== Japanese colonial suppression ==
By the late 1930s, Japan's colonial government had tightened its cultural assimilation policies, aiming to spread Japanese language and culture while limiting Korean-language education. Korean became an optional school subject in 1938 and was removed from school lessons in 1942.

In 1942, Japanese colonial authorities arrested members of the Korean Language Society in what became known as the Korean Language Society incident. Members were questioned during investigations, and officials took the dictionary manuscript. Two scholars, Yi Yun-jae and Han Jing, died in custody. The arrests stopped years of language research and dictionary work, and the dictionary was not published before Korean liberation in 1945.

== Post-liberation activities and legacy ==
After Korea's liberation in 1945, the surviving members of the Korean Language Society returned to their work. The dictionary manuscript taken by Japanese authorities was found in a warehouse at Seoul Station, allowing the editors to continue their work. After more editing, the first volume of the Great Korean Dictionary was published in 1947. The six-volume dictionary was completed in 1957.

The society also helped shape Korean-language education and policy after liberation. Schools used the spelling rules published in 1933 by the society, and its members helped write Korean-language textbooks and train teachers. In 1949, the organization adopted its present name, the Korean Language Society (Hangeul Hakhoe).

The spelling rules published in 1933 provided a starting point for later spelling rules in both North and South Korea. After Korea was divided, however, the two governments developed different language policies, which led to differences in spelling, vocabulary, and the use of words borrowed from other languages. Former society members also helped shape language policy in both countries, including Yi Geuk-ro in North Korea and Choe Hyeon-bae in South Korea.

== See also ==
- Korean language
- Korean as a foreign language
- South Korean standard language
