= Yukjin Korean =

Divergent northern Korean dialect

Yukjin
- Yukchin / Ryukjin / Ryukchin
- 六鎮말 / 육진말 / Yukjin-mal; 여섯 고을 말 / Yeoseot goeul mal
- Native to: North Korea, China
- Region: Yukjin
- Ethnicity: Koreans, formerly Jaegaseung
- Language family: Koreanic: Korean?; Yukjin
- Early forms: Old Korean: Middle Korean
- Writing system: Hangul

Language codes
- ISO 639-3: –
- Korean dialect areas with Yukjin in brown

Korean name
- Hangul: 육진 방언, 륙진 방언
- Hanja: 六鎭方言
- RR: Yukjin bangeon, Ryukjin bangeon
- MR: Yukchin pangŏn, Ryukchin pangŏn

Ryukjin language
- Hangul: 륙진어, 육진어
- Hanja: 六鎭語
- RR: Ryukjineo, Yukjineo
- MR: Ryukchinŏ, Yukchinŏ

The Yukjin dialect (Yukjin Korean: 육진말; Hanja: 六鎮말; RR: Yukjinmal (Note: South Korean Standard: Yukjin bangeon, North Korean: 륙진방언; Ryukchin pangŏn,)) is a variety of Korean or a separate Koreanic language spoken in the historic Yukjin region of northeastern Korea, south of the Tumen River. Its phonology and lexicon are unusually conservative, preserving many Middle Korean forms. Thus, Alexander Vovin classified it as a distinct language.

Yukjin speakers currently live not only in the Tumen River homeland, now part of North Korea, but also in the Korean diaspora in Northeast China and Central Asia that formed in the nineteenth and twentieth centuries. The dialect is under pressure from the Gyeonggi ("Seoul") dialect, the prestige dialect, as well as local Chinese and Central Asian languages.

== History and distribution ==
The six garrisons (yuk jin) in northeastern Korea

The Sino-Korean term 六鎭 ryukchin 'six garrisons' refers to the six towns of Hoeryŏng, Chongsŏng, Onsŏng, Kyŏngwŏn, Kyŏnghŭng, and Puryŏng, all located south of a bend of the Tumen River. The area of these towns belonged to the Tungusic-speaking Jurchen people until the early fifteenth century, when King Sejong conquered the area into Korea's Hamgyong Province and peopled the six towns with immigrants from southeastern Korea. The Yukjin dialect is the distinctive Koreanic variety spoken by their descendants. The Jaegaseung, descendants of Jurchen people who lived in the Tumen River valley, also spoke Yukjin Korean despite their isolation from mainstream Korean society.

The Yukjin dialect of the six towns is further divided into an eastern variety, typified by the speech of Onsŏng and Kyŏngwŏn, and a western variety as spoken in Hoeryŏng and Chongsŏng. The eastern variety preserves more phonological archaisms. Some analyses consider the language of Kyŏnghŭng and Puryŏng to belong to the mainstream Hamgyong dialect rather than to Yukjin.

Yukjin is divergent from the dialect prevalent in the rest of Hamgyŏng Province, called the Hamgyŏng dialect, and generally more closely aligned with the western Pyongan dialect. Some of the earliest descriptions of Hamgyŏng dialects—from the seventeenth century—already noted that the speech of the Yukjin area was different from that of the rest of Hamgyŏng. The 1693 provincial gazette Bukgwan-ji stated that while most of Hamgyŏng had a "most divergent" dialect, the Yukjin area had "no provincial speech" of its own because it had been settled by people from the southern provinces, who continued to use the standard southern dialects. (Note: Classical Chinese original: "咸鏡一道鄕音最別 而唯北道九官無鄕音 。") In 1773, the high-ranking official Yu Ui-yang also wrote that the language of Yukjin was easier to understand than southern Hamgyŏng dialects because it was more similar to southern varieties of Korean, although he conceded that "when I first heard it, it was difficult to understand". (Note: Early Modern Korean original: "처엄으로 드르니 알기 어렵더라.")

Despite these previous similarities to southern dialects, Yukjin has now become the most conservative mainland variety of Korean because it was not subject to many of the Early Modern phonological shifts that produced the modern mainland dialects. The Hamgyŏng dialect, which participated in these shifts, now resembles the southern dialects to a greater extent than does Yukjin.

In response to poor harvests in the 1860s, Yukjin speakers began emigrating to the southern part of Primorsky Krai in the Russian Far East. Their speech was recorded in a dictionary compiled in 1874 by Mikhail Putsillo, and in materials compiled in 1904 by native speakers who were students at the Kazan Teacher's Seminary. Larger waves of immigrants from other parts of North Hamgyŏng arrived in the area in the 1910s and 1920s, fleeing the Japanese annexation of Korea.

In the 1930s, Stalin ordered the forced resettlement of the entire Korean population of the Russian Far East, some 250,000 people. The main destinations were concentrated particularly in what is now Uzbekistan and Kazakhstan. There are small Korean communities scattered throughout Central Asia maintaining forms of Korean known collectively as Koryo-mar, but their language is under severe pressure from local languages and Gyeonggi (Seoul) Korean. About 10 percent of Koryo-mar speakers use the Ryukjin language/dialect.

The Japanese annexation of Korea also triggered migration from northern parts of Korea to eastern Manchuria, and more Koreans were forcibly transferred there in the 1930s as part of the Japanese occupation of Manchuria. Linguists in China divide the Korean varieties spoken in Northeast China into Northwestern (Pyongan), North-central (Hamgyŏng) and Northeastern (Yukjin) groups. The latter are spoken in the easternmost part of Jilin, China.

Consequently, the dialect's current speakers are scattered between the traditional Tumen River homeland, now part of North Hamgyong and Rason, North Korea; Korean communities in parts of Northeast China; Koryo-saram communities in the post-Soviet states; and people from the Yukjin region who have fled to South Korea since the division of Korea in the 1940s. Kim Thay-kyun studied the speech of North Hamgyong refugees in the 1980s. Research on speakers currently residing in the North Korean homeland is rare, and conducted primarily by Chinese researchers of Korean ethnicity. The dialect appears to have declined in North Korea due to extensive state promotion of the North Korean standard language.

== Phonology ==
The Ryukjin dialect has eight vowels, corresponding to the eight vowels of standard Seoul Korean. In Yukjin, the vowel wo (standard Seoul [o]) is more open and u (Seoul [ɨ~ɯ]) is more backed. Unlike in Seoul Korean, where the Middle Korean vowel /ʌ/ almost always shifted to /a/ in the first syllable of a word, Yukjin shifted /ʌ/ to /o/ after labial consonants.

For some speakers, there is an additional vowel, transcribed [ï], intermediate between u [ɨ] and i [i]. This vowel represents an intermediate stage in a diachronic sound shift from uy [ɨj] > [ï] > i [i]. The sound shift is now complete for younger speakers and the vowel has disappeared among them, although older speakers retain the vowel.

Like Seoul Korean, Yukjin has a limited vowel harmony system in which only a verb stem whose final (or only) vowel is /a/, /o/, or /ɛ/ can take a suffix beginning with the vowel a-. Other verb stems take an allomorphic suffix beginning with ə-. Vowel harmony is in the process of change among younger speakers in China, with all stems ending in /p/ and multisyllabic stems ending in /u/ now taking the a- variant of the suffix as well. These are new divergences between Yukjin and the Seoul standard.

In Yukjin, the consonant c is usually realized as its typically North Korean value, [ts]. It is realized as [tɕ] before /i/, and the consonant-glide sequence cy- is also realized as the single affricate [tɕ]. In the post-Soviet varieties of Yukjin, the phoneme /l/—realized as the tap [ɾ] intervocally and [l] otherwise in most other Korean dialects—is always realized as [ɾ] or the trill [r], except when followed by another /l/. In non-Soviet dialects, [ɾ] is obligatory intervocally, while [ɾ] and [l] may both be used otherwise.

Many features of Middle Korean survive in the dialect, including: (Note: Korean forms given in Yale Romanization, the standard for Korean linguistics)

- the pitch accent otherwise found only in other Hamgyong varieties and the southern Gyeongsang dialect
- the distinction between s- and sy-, preserved only in Yukjin
- a lack of palatalization of t(h)i-, t(h)y- into c(h)i-, c(h)-
- preservation of initial n- before i and y
- preservation of Middle Korean alternative noun stems that appear when followed by a vowel-initial suffix, e.g. Yukjin namwo "tree" but nangk-ey "in the tree" (Middle Korean namwo and namk-oy, Seoul namwu and namwu-ey)

In some respects, Yukjin is more conservative than fifteenth-century Middle Korean. For example, Middle Korean had voiced fricatives /ɣ/, /z/, and /β/, which have disappeared in most modern dialects. Evidence from internal reconstruction suggests that these consonants arose from lenition of /k/, /s/, and /p/ in voiced environments. Yukjin often retains /k/, /s/, and /p/ in these words: (Note: There is an ongoing sound shift in Yukjin dialects in which some cases of intervocalic /p/ is becoming /w/ through an intermediary [β], the same sound shift that affected central Korean dialects several centuries ago. In some words, Yukjin lacks a corresponding /k/ form for Middle Korean /ɣ/.)

Correspondences with lenited consonants
| English | Middle Korean | Seoul Korean | Yukjin |
|---|---|---|---|
| to inform | 알외 alGwoy- /alɣoj/ | 아뢰 alwoy- /alwe/ | 알귀 alkwuy- /aɾkwi/ |
| autumn | ᄀᆞᅀᆞᆯ kozol /kʌzʌl/ | 가을 kaul /kaɯl/ | 가슬 kasul /kasɯɾ/ |
| silkworm | *누ᄫᅦ (Note: Reconstructed; the loss of /β/ is already complete in the earliest attested form of the word.) *nwuWey *nuβəj | 누에 nwuey /nue/ | 느베 nupey /nɯpe/ |

Similarly, the Middle Korean word twǔlh 'two' has one syllable, but its rising pitch indicates that it is descended from an earlier disyllabic form with high pitch on the second syllable, and some Old Korean renderings also suggest two syllables. Some Yukjin varieties have twuwúl for this word, preserving the older disyllabic form. The dialect has accordingly been described as a highly conservative phonological "relic area".

== Grammar ==
=== Nouns ===
Case markers in Koryo-mar varieties
| Case | After consonant | After non-rounded vowel | After rounded vowel (Sometimes labial consonants) | Notes |
|---|---|---|---|---|
| Nominative | -i | | | The marker causes a final -n to be dropped and also causes umlaut, e.g. /a/ becomes /æ/. For most Koryo-saram speakers, the umlauted forms with /æ/ are the new underlying forms for most forms originally with /a/. Unlike all other currently spoken Koreanic varieties, Yukjin lacks the nominative allomorph -ka, found after a vowel in other dialects. |
| Accusative | -i | -li | -lwu (-wu) | Cognate to Middle and Modern Korean -(l)ul, with the final liquid dropped. -li is sometimes realized as a single tap [ɾ]. |
| Instrumental | -illi | -li | -wulli | Cognate to Standard Korean -(u)lwo, Middle Korean -(u)la |
| Dative-locative | -ey for inanimates and -(wu)key, -(i)ntey for animates | | | Cognate to Standard Korean -ey, -eykey, and -hantey |
| Genitive | nominative marker generally used | | -wu | Middle Korean -uy, phonetically [ɨj], may have been reanalyzed as a sequence of two nominative markers (-i-i) which was then reduced to a single nominative. |
| Ablative | -eyse for inanimates and -(wu)keyse for animates | | | Cognate to Standard Korean -eyse and -eykeyse |

=== Verbs ===
Most analyses of the verbal paradigm identify three speech levels of formality and politeness, which are distinguished by sentence-final suffixes. Scholars differ on which suffixes mark which speech level. Several formal-level markers have an allomorph beginning with su- after consonants, reflecting their origin as a compound of a preexisting marker and the honorific-marking verb-internal suffix -sup, which takes the allomorph -(u)p after a verb stem ending in a vowel. Mood-marking sentence-final suffixes which have been identified by Chinese, Korean, and Western researchers include:

| Suffix | Mood | Speech level | Notes |
|---|---|---|---|
| (스)꾸마 -(su)kkwuma | Declarative, Interrogative, Imperative | Formal | The etymologically more transparent form -(su)pkwuma is also found. There is a related form -(su)kkwoma with an apparently identical function, which is no longer widely in use by North Korean speakers. Contracted forms such as -(su)kkwum and -(su)kkwu are also found, and have a more casual connotation. The suffix is intonated differently depending on the mood. Younger speakers in China tend to use -(su)pnita, the Standard Korean equivalent. |
| (스)꿔니 -(su)kkwueni | Declarative, Interrogative, Imperative | Formal | More formal and less intimate than -(su)kkwuma. It is not currently widely used in North Korea outside the town of Hoeryŏng. Variants such as -(su)kkwuei, -(su)kkeni, -(su)kkwoani, and -(su)kkai have been attested. The marker is rare among speakers outside North Korea. The suffix is intonated differently depending on the mood. |
| 오/소 -(s)wo | Declarative, Interrogative, Imperative | Most commonly neutral, but found in all speech levels | -swo is used after non-liquid consonants. In verb stems ending with -i or -wu, including the positive copula i- "to be" and the negative copula ani- "to not be", it may be omitted. This versatile suffix is also found in the Gyeongsang dialect, but only as a formal marker. |
| 슴 -sum | Declarative | Neutral | An innovation widespread in casual speech, this suffix is also found in non-Yukjin Hamgyong dialects, and was previously found in the Pyongan dialect. |
| 다 -ta | Declarative | Informal | Found throughout Korean dialects as a declarative marker and attested since Old Korean. |
| 슴둥/ㅁ둥 -(su)mtwung | Interrogative | Formal | An interrogative marker unique to Yukjin. The second vowel is usually nasalized, but the non-nasalized variant -(su)mtwu is also found. Younger speakers in China prefer -(su)ngkka, loaned from Standard Korean -(su)pnikka. |
| 냐 -nya | Interrogative | Informal | It also takes the form -ni, apparently without any semantic difference. It may combine with a preceding past tense marker -ass/ess as -an/en, and with the retrospective marker -te as -tun. Found throughout Korean dialects as an interrogative marker. |
| 읍소 -(u)pswo | Imperative | Formal | Etymologically formed from the versatile suffix -(s)wo, this suffix is also found as -(u)pse or -(u)sswo. |
| (아)라/(어)라 -(a)la/(e)la | Imperative | Informal | Found in Standard Korean as an informal imperative marker. In modern North Korean dialects, /l/ may be nasalized to /n/. In Onsŏng, the variant -na is common; in Hoeryŏng, -ne. |
| 구려 -kwulye | Imperative | Informal | An unusual marker restricted to mothers speaking to their children, attested from Koryo-saram sources. |
| 깁소 -kipswo | Propositive | Formal | Also attested as -keypswo and -keypsywo. Etymologically a compound of -ki and the aforementioned -(u)pswo. |
| 기오 -kiwo | Propositive | Neutral | Also attested as -keywo and -kywo. Etymologically a compound of -ki and -wo. |
| 자 -ca | Propositive | Informal | Also found in Standard Korean. |
| 구마 -kwuma | Exclamatory | —N/a | Pronounced similarly to -(su)kkwuma, but does not take an allomorph with su- even after a consonant |

=== Syntax ===
Highly unusually, the Yukjin negative particle (such as ani 'not', mwo(s) 'cannot') intervenes between the main verb and the auxiliary, unlike in other Koreanic varieties (except other Hamgyŏng varieties) where the particle either precedes the main verb or follows the auxiliary.

| Yukjin | Seoul |
|---|---|
| 빨리 나 모 오디 ppalli na mwo wo-ti quickly move.out cannot come-DEC '[I] can't come out quickly' | 빨리 못 나오지 ppalli mwos na-wo-ci quickly cannot move.out-come-DEC '[I] can't come out quickly' |

When followed by the verb kath- 'to be like', the normally adnominal verbal suffixes -n and -l function as nominalizers. Nominalization was the original function of the two suffixes, being the main attested use in Old Korean, but was already rare in the Middle Korean of the early fifteenth century.

== Lexicon ==
The basic Yukjin lexicon is unusually archaic, preserving many forms attested in Middle Korean but since lost in other dialects. Remarkably, no distinction is made between maternal and paternal relatives, unlike other Korean dialects (including Jeju) which distinguish maternal uncles, aunts, and grandparents from paternal ones. This may reflect weaker influence from patriarchal norms promoted by the Neo-Confucian Joseon state.

There are a few loans from Jurchen or its descendant Manchu. This includes the verb stem 가리우 kaliwu- 'to breed an animal', from the Manchu verb stem gari- 'to copulate [for dogs]' with the Koreanic causative suffix -wu attached; 우쿠리 wukwuli 'wicker basket' from Manchu uku 'id.'; and 탄 than 'goose-catching snare' from Manchu dan 'id.' There are also a few loanwords from Northeastern Mandarin. Among remaining speakers in the post-Soviet states, there are many Russian borrowings and calques.
