= Hamgyŏng dialect =

Dialect of the Korean language

Northeast Korean
- Hamgyŏng Dialect
- Native to: North Korea, China, former Soviet Union
- Region: Hamgyŏng
- Language family: Koreanic: Korean; Northern; Northeast Korean

Language codes
- ISO 639-3: –
- Glottolog: hamg1238
- The Hamgyong dialect in Korean dialects is colored in purple

Korean name
- Hangul: 동북 방언
- Hanja: 東北方言
- RR: Dongbuk bangeon
- MR: Tongbuk pangŏn

The Northeast Dialect, sometimes called the Hamgyong Dialect (Korean: 함경 방언), is a dialect of the Korean language used in most of North and South Hamgyŏng and Ryanggang provinces of northeastern North Korea, all of which were originally united as Hamgyŏng Province. Since the nineteenth century, it has also been spoken by Korean diaspora communities in Northeast China and the former Soviet Union.

Characteristic features of Hamgyŏng include a pitch accent closely aligned to Middle Korean tone, extensive palatalization, widespread umlaut, preservation of pre-Middle Korean intervocalic consonants, distinctive verbal suffixes, and an unusual syntactic rule in which negative particles intervene between the auxiliary and the main verb.

== History and distribution ==
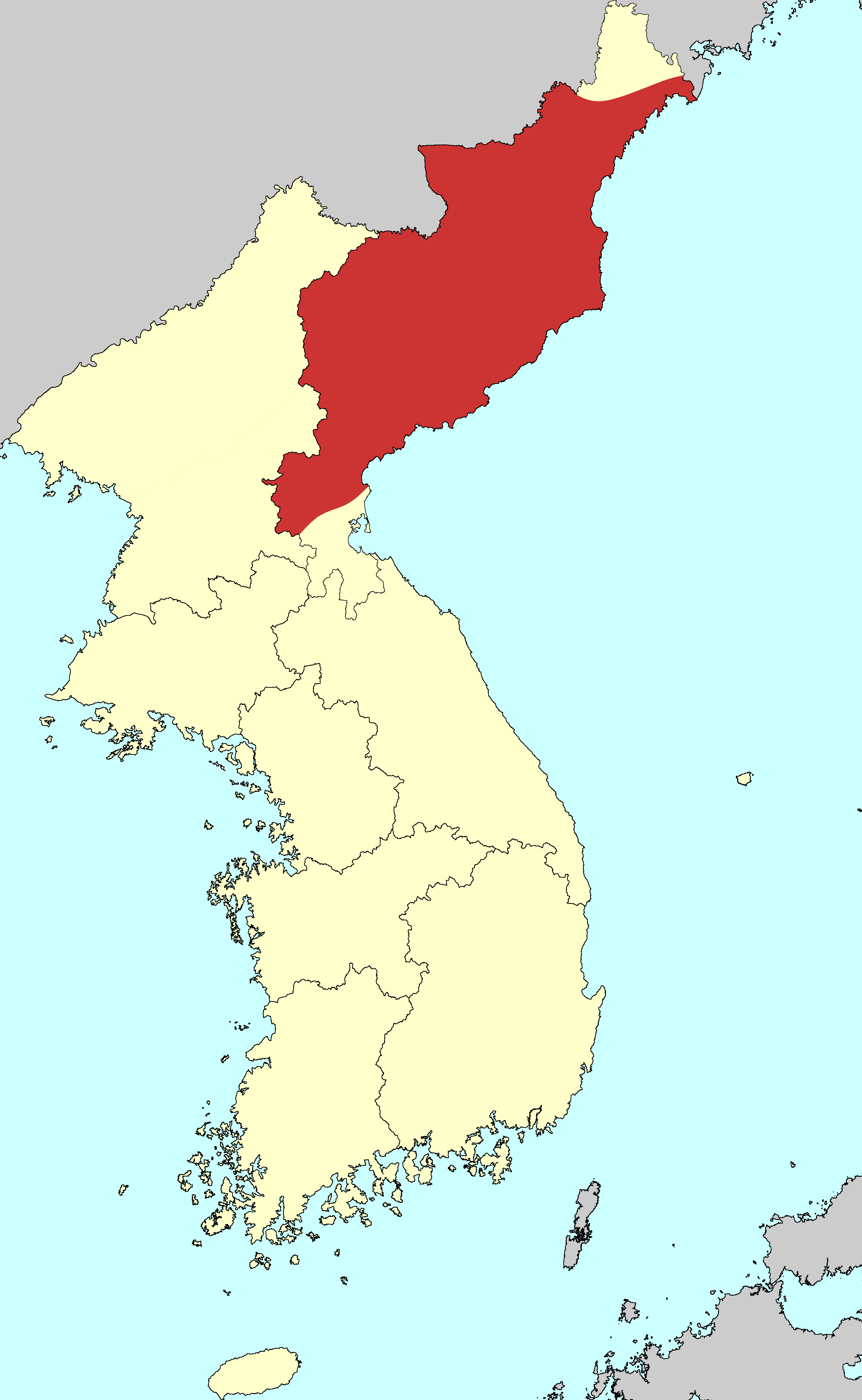
Distribution of the Hamgyŏng dialect within the traditional Eight Provinces of Korea

The Hamgyŏng dialect is the Korean variety spoken in northeastern Hamgyŏng Province, now further divided as the North Korean provinces of North Hamgyŏng, South Hamgyŏng, and Ryanggang. However, not all of Hamgyŏng speaks the dialect. The Korean variety spoken south of a bend of the Tumen River, on Korea's border with China and Russia, is classified as a separate Yukjin dialect which is significantly more conservative than the mainstream Hamgyŏng dialect. The far southern counties of Kŭmya and Kowŏn, while within South Hamgyŏng's administrative jurisdiction, speak a dialect which is usually not classified as Hamgyŏng because it lacks a pitch accent.

The dialect is now spoken outside of Korea, in both China and Central Asia. In the late 19th and early 20th centuries, in response to poor harvests and the Japanese annexation of Korea, many Koreans, including Hamgyŏng speakers, emigrated from the northern parts of the peninsula to eastern Manchuria (now Northeast China) and the southern part of Primorsky Krai in the Russian Far East. The descendants of these immigrants to Manchuria continue to speak, read, and write varieties of Korean while living in China, where they enjoy regional autonomy. In the 1930s, Stalin had the entire Korean population of the Russian Far East, some 250,000 people, forcibly deported to Soviet Central Asia, particularly Uzbekistan and Kazakhstan. There are small Korean communities scattered throughout central Asia maintaining forms of Korean known collectively as Koryo-mar, but their language is under severe pressure from local languages and Standard Seoul Korean and has been expected to go extinct within the early 21st century.

The most conservative forms of Hamgyŏng dialect are currently found in Central Asian communities, because the Korean language's lack of vitality there has put an end to natural language change. Among the communities where Hamgyŏng remains widely spoken, the Chinese diaspora dialect is more conservative than the modern North Korean dialect, as the latter has been under extensive pressure from the state-enforced North Korean standard language since the 1960s.

The first dictionary of Korean in a European language, Putsillo 1874's attempt at a Russian–Korean dictionary, was based largely on the Hamgyŏng dialect; the author lived in Vladivostok while composing it.

== Phonology ==
Like the southeastern Gyeongsang dialect but unlike other Korean dialects, the Hamgyŏng dialect has a distinct high-low pitch accent system used to distinguish what would otherwise be homophones. Pitch-accent minimal pairs do not have tone in isolation, but only in the presence of a particle or copula. For instance, the word 배 pay—homophonous in the toneless standard Korean dialect of Seoul—may mean both "pear" and "belly" in Hamgyŏng as well, so long as the word exists in isolation. But when attached to the topic marker 는 -nun, pear-TOP is realized as pay-nún with a high pitch on the second syllable, while belly-TOP is realized as páy-nun with high pitch on the first syllable. Unlike Gyeongsang pitches, Hamgyŏng pitches are regular reflexes of fifteenth-century Middle Korean tones. The Middle Korean high and rising tones have become the Hamgyŏng high pitch, and the Middle Korean low tone has become the Hamgyŏng low pitch. Vowel length is not phonemic. (Note: All Korean forms given in the Yale Romanization of Korean, the standard system for Korean linguistics)

The Hamgyŏng dialect has palatalized both Middle Korean t(h)i-, t(h)y- and k(h)i-, k(h)y- into c(h)i-, c(h)- like the majority of Korean dialects, but unlike Seoul Korean, which has palatalized only the former pair.

Middle Korean had voiced fricatives /ɣ/, /z/, and /β/, which have disappeared in most modern dialects, but not in Gyeongsang and other southern provinces. Evidence from internal reconstruction suggests that these consonants arose from lenition of /k/, /s/, and /p/ in voiced environments. Again like Gyeongsang, Hamgyŏng often retains /k/, /s/, and /p/ in these words.

In the Hamgyŏng dialect, the "t-irregular verbs", which are Middle Korean verb stems that end in [t] before a consonant-initial suffix and in [ɾ] before a vowel-initial one, are regularly realized as [l] even before a vowel. However, unlike verb stems that always ended in [l] even in Middle Korean, the formerly t-irregular verbs cause reinforcement of the following consonant. This is again identical to the reflexes of t-irregularity in the Gyeongsang dialect.

The Hamgyŏng dialect traditionally had ten vowels, corresponding to the ten vowels of very conservative Seoul Korean speakers. However, /ø/ and /y/ have now diphthongized into /wɛ/ and /wi/, as in Seoul, and there is an ongoing merger of /u/ and /ɯ/, now almost complete, and increasingly also of /o/ and /ə/. The end result is expected to be a much-reduced six-vowel inventory. The merger of /u/ and /ɯ/ and /o/ and /ə/ is a newly emergent areal feature in North Korean dialects since the mid-twentieth century, also shared by the modern Pyongan dialect. Many instances of /o/ in Standard Korean, especially in grammatical constructions, are /u~ɯ/ in Hamgyŏng. For instance, the Seoul conjunction 하고 ha-ko [hago] "and" is realized as 하그 ha-ku [hagɯ].

There is a productive system of umlaut in the Hamgyŏng dialect. /a/, /ə/, /u/, /o/, and /ɯ/ are fronted to /ɛ/, /e/, /y~wi/, /ø~wɛ/, and /i/, respectively, when followed by a sequence of a non-coronal consonant and a front and close vowel or glide, such as /i/. In some cases, this has become lexicalized; compare Hamgyŏng 괴기 /køki~kwɛki/ "meat" to Seoul 고기 /koki "id." Umlaut is also common in Gyeongsang.

In native vocabulary, Middle Korean CjV sequences have monophthongized: Middle Korean 혀 hye /hjə/ > Hamgyŏng 헤 hey /he/. In Sino-Korean vocabulary, CjV sequences have merged into umlauted monophthongs which have now become diphthongized again: compare Seoul 교실 kyosil /kjosil/ "classroom" to Hamgyŏng 괴실 koysil /køsil~kwesil/.

== Grammar ==
As with all Koreanic varieties, case markers are attached to nouns to show noun case.

Hamgyŏng case markers
Case	After consonant	After vowel	Seoul cognate
Nominative	이 -i, 이가 -ika		이 -i, 가 -ka
Accusative	으 -u	르 -lu	을 -ul, 를 -lul
Instrumental	으르 -ulu	르 -lu	으로 -ulo, 로 -lo
Dative-locative	에 -ey, 이 -i for inanimates and -(으)게 -(u)key for animates		에 -ey, 에게 -eykey
Genitive	으 -u		의 -uy
Comitative	가 -ka		와 -oa, 과 -koa

Most analyses identify three speech levels of differing formality and deference to the addressee, which are marked by sentence-final verb-ending suffixes, as in other Korean dialects. Some of the more distinctive Hamgyŏng verb enders include 지비 -cipi, a casual suffix which elicits confirmation or agreement; the formal suffix 우/수다 -(s)wuta and the neutral-level suffix 음/슴메 -(s)ummey, both of which may be used—depending on the intonation—for declarative, interrogative, and imperative moods alike; and the neutral-level propositive suffix ㅂ세 -psey. The informal-level suffixes are identical to Standard Korean ones.

Highly unusually, the Hamgyŏng negative particle (such as ai 'not', mos 'cannot') intervenes between the main verb and the auxiliary, unlike in other Koreanic varieties (except Yukjin, also spoken in Hamgyŏng) where the particle either precedes the main verb or follows the auxiliary.

술기도 넘어 못 가오
swulki-to nem-e mos ka-o
cart-even cross-INF cannot go-DEC
'Not even a cart can cross over' [Hamgyŏng]

수레도 못 넘어 가오
suley-to mos nem-e ka-o
cart-even cannot cross-INF go-DEC
'Not even a cart can cross over' [Seoul]

== Lexicon ==
Specific vocabulary differences include kinship terminology. For example, "father", in standard Korean abŏji (아버지), becomes abai (아바이) or aebi (애비). Another example would be the use of (슴)음둥 (sŭm)ŭmdung in the Northeast dialect, as opposed to the standard -습니다 seumnida, or the use of -으 eu instead of -의 ui, 으르 eureu instead of -으로 euro, or -으/르 eu/reu instead of 을/를 eul/reul.

Example sentences

나는 꼬부랑국수르 먹였다.

nanŭn kkoburangguksurŭ mŏgyŏtta

"I ate instant noodles."

선생님으르서 드와드리겠음둥.

sŏnsaengnimŭrŭsŏ tŭwadŭrigessŭmdung

"As a teacher, I will help you."

이것은 이 님으 조선옷.

igŏs'ŭn nimŭ chosŏnot

"This is that man's Chosŏn-ot.
