= Koryo-mar =

Dialect of Korean spoken in former USSR

- 고려말
- Pronunciation: [ko.ɾjo.maɾ]
- Native to: Uzbekistan, Russia, Kazakhstan, Ukraine, Kyrgyzstan
- Ethnicity: Korean
- Native speakers: (220,000 cited 1989) current number of speakers is unknown
- Language family: Koreanic: Korean; Northern; Hamgyŏng; Koryo-mar
- Writing system: Hangul

Language codes
- ISO 639-3: –
- Glottolog: None
- IETF: ko-143

Koryo-mar

North Korean name
- Chosŏn'gŭl: 고려말
- Hancha: 高麗말
Transcriptions
- Revised Romanization: Goryeomal
- McCune–Reischauer: Koryŏmal

Russian name
- Russian: Корё мар
- Romanization: Koryo mar

Koryo-mar (Korean: 고려말; Russian: Корё мар) is a language spoken by Koryo-saram, ethnic Koreans who live in the countries of the former Soviet Union. It is descended from the Hamgyŏng dialect and multiple other varieties of Northeastern Korean. Koryo-mar is often reported as difficult to understand by speakers of standard Korean due to the differences in writing, pronunciation, and vocabulary; this may be compounded by the fact that the majority of Koryo-saram today use Russian and not Korean as their first language.

According to German Kim, Koryo-mar is not widely used in the media and is not taught in schools. Thus it can be classified as endangered.

== Names ==
In the speech of Koryo-saram, the language is referred to as Koryo-mar (고려말 / корё мар), with several alternative pronunciations, including Kore-mar (коре мар) and Kore-mari (коре мари).

In South Korea, the language is referred to as Goryeomal (고려말) or Central Asian Korean (중앙아시아한국어).

In Russia and other former Soviet states, the language is referred to as Koryo-mar (корё мар) or Koryo-mal' (корё маль), of which the former reflects the spoken form while the latter reflects the literary form of Korean.

== Orthography ==
Speakers do not generally use Koryo-mar as a literary language. Written Korean during the Soviet period tended to follow the North Korean standard language, while both Northern and Southern forms have occurred after the dissolution of the Soviet Union. However, some modern writers, most notably Lavrenti Son, have created plays and short stories in Koryo-mar using Hangul.

A movement for the romanization of Koryo-mar took place in the late 1930s, promoted by various government officials and linguists, but it did not have much success.

== Phonology ==
Characteristics of Koryo-mar distinct from that of Standard Korean include the following phonological differences:

- ㄹ is [ɾ] or [r] in all positions except when geminate, where it is pronounced the same as standard Korean
- frequent loss of ㄹ before coronal consonants
- A pitch accent system that distinguishes minimal pairs; it has two tones, high and low
- the retention of Middle Korean initial n before [i] and [j]
- ㄱ is [t͡ɕ] before ㅣ
- ㄴ and ㅇ at the end of a word are 이
- ㅏ, ㅔ are pronounced as ㅑ; and ㅗ is pronounced as ㅔ
- ㅗ, ㅡ are pronounced as ㅜ
- ㅣ is interchangeable with ㅡ
- [w] is pronounced as [v] due to Russian influence
- ㅈ is pronounced as ㄷ
- ㄱ is pronounced as ㅂ in the middle of a word

== Pedagogy ==
The community had schools in the Far East, but this was disrupted permanently by their deportation to Central Asia.

Koryo-mar is not taught as a subject or used as the medium of instruction in any schools. Furthermore, due to the encouragement of younger generations to learn Russian, the decline of Koryo-mar usage in families has also accelerated, with the majority of younger Koryo-saram using Koryo-mar words only when talking about food, especially Koryo-saram cuisine, or possibly certain household items. The Korean language as taught in universities of the post-Soviet states is Standard Korean, with instructors being native or trained. In one instance, a South Korean professor tried to teach Koryo-mar at Almaty State University, but he did not achieve much success.

However, despite the stark decline in the use of Koryo-mar, certain words, especially regarding food and household items, as well as familial titles to a certain extent have continued to be passed down to varying degrees to younger generations of Koryo-saram through exposure by older generations.

== See also ==
- Koreanic languages
- Cyrillization of Korean
- Korean dialects
- Hamgyŏng dialect
- Yukjin dialect
