= Koreanic languages =

Language family

Koreanic
- Geographic distribution: Korea, Northeast China
- Ethnicity: Koreans
- Linguistic classification: One of the world's primary language families
- Proto-language: Proto-Koreanic
- Subdivisions: Korean; Jeju; Yukjin; †Baekje ?; †Goguryeo ?

Language codes
- Glottolog: kore1284
- Current extent of Koreanic as majority and minority (dashed) languages in East Asia

Koreanic (Korean: 한국어족, romanized: Hanguk-eojok; Munhwaŏ: 조선어족, romanized: Chosŏn-ŏjok) is a small language family consisting of the Korean and Jeju languages. The latter is often described as a dialect of Korean but is mutually unintelligible with mainland Korean varieties. Alexander Vovin has also suggested that the Yukjin dialect of the far northeast should be similarly distinguished.

Korean has been richly documented since the introduction of the Hangul alphabet in the 15th century. Earlier renditions of Korean using Chinese characters, however, are much more difficult to interpret.

All modern varieties are descended from the Old Korean of the state of Unified Silla, which unified the Three Kingdoms of Korea. What little is known of other languages spoken on the peninsula before the late 7th-century Sillan unification comes largely from placenames. Some of these languages are believed to have been Koreanic, but there is also evidence suggesting that Japonic languages were spoken in central and southern parts of the peninsula. There have been many attempts to link Koreanic with other language families, most often with Tungusic or Japonic, but no proposed genetic relationships has been conclusively demonstrated. (Note: Ramsey writes that "the genetic relationship between Korean and Japanese, if it in fact exists, is probably more complex and distant than we can imagine on the basis of our present state of knowledge.")

== Extant languages ==
Dialect zones

The various forms of Korean are conventionally described as "dialects" of a single Korean language, but breaks in intelligibility justify viewing them as a small family of two or three languages.

=== Korean ===
Korean dialects form a dialect continuum stretching from the southern end of the Korean peninsula to Yanbian prefecture in the Chinese province of Jilin, though dialects at opposite ends of the continuum are not mutually intelligible. This area is usually divided into five or six dialect zones following provincial boundaries, with Yanbian dialects included in the northeastern Hamgyŏng group. Dialects differ in palatalization and the reflexes of Middle Korean accent, vowels, voiced fricatives, word-medial /k/ and word-initial /l/ and /n/.

Korean is extensively and precisely documented from the introduction of the Hangul alphabet in the 15th century (the Late Middle Korean period). Earlier forms, written with Chinese characters using a variety of strategies, are much more obscure. The key sources on Early Middle Korean (10th to 14th centuries) are a Chinese text, the Jilin leishi (1103–1104), and the pharmacological work Hyangyak kugŭppang (鄕藥救急方, mid-13th century). During this period, Korean absorbed a huge number of Chinese loanwords, affecting all aspects of the language. It is estimated that Sino-Korean vocabulary makes up more than half of the Korean lexicon, but only about 10% of basic vocabulary. Old Korean (6th to early 10th centuries) is even more sparsely attested, mostly by inscriptions and 14 hyangga songs composed between the 7th and 9th centuries and recorded in the Samguk yusa (13th century). (Note: Nam Pung-hyun considers Old Korean as spanning the period from the Three Kingdoms to the Mongol invasion (mid-13th century).)

The standard languages of North and South Korea are both based primarily on the central prestige dialect of Seoul, despite the North Korean claim that their standard is based on the speech of their capital Pyongyang. The two standards have phonetic and lexical differences. Many loanwords have been purged from the North Korean standard, while South Korea has expanded Sino-Korean vocabulary and adopted loanwords, especially from English. Nonetheless, due to its origin in the Seoul dialect, the North Korean standard language is easily intelligible to all South Koreans.

In the late 19th and early 20th centuries, in response to poor harvests and the Japanese annexation of Korea, people emigrated from the northern parts of the peninsula to eastern Manchuria and the southern part of Primorsky Krai in the Russian Far East. Korean labourers were forcibly moved to Manchuria as part of the Japanese occupation of Manchuria. There are now about 2 million Koreans in China, mostly in the border prefecture of Yanbian, where the language has official status.

The speech of Koreans in the Russian Far East was described by Russian scholars such as Mikhail Putsillo, who compiled a dictionary in 1874. Some 250,000 Koreans lived in the area in the 1930s, when Stalin had them forcibly deported to Soviet Central Asia, particularly Uzbekistan and Kazakhstan. There are small Korean communities scattered throughout central Asia maintaining forms of Korean known collectively as Koryo-mar. There is also a Korean population on Sakhalin, descended from people forcibly transferred to the Japanese part of the island before 1945.

Most Koreans in Japan are descendants of immigrants during the Japanese occupation. Most Korean-language schools in Japan follow the North Korean standard. The form of Korean spoken in Japan also shows the influence of Japanese, for example in a reduced vowel system and some grammatical simplification. Korean-speakers are also found throughout the world, for example in North America, where Seoul Korean is the accepted standard.

=== Jeju ===
The speech of Jeju Island is not mutually intelligible with standard Korean, suggesting that it should be treated as a separate language. Standard 15th-century texts include a back central unrounded vowel /ʌ/ (written with the Hangul letter ⟨ㆍ⟩), which has merged with other vowels in mainland dialects but is retained as a distinct vowel in Jeju. The Hunminjeongeum Haerye (1446) states that the combination /jʌ/ was not found in the standard speech of that time, but did occur in some dialects. It is also distinguished in Jeju. This suggests that Jeju diverged from other dialects some time before the 15th century.

=== Yukchin ===
The six garrisons (Yukchin) in far northeastern Korea

The Yukchin dialect, spoken in the northernmost part of Korea and adjacent areas in China, forms a dialect island separate from neighbouring northeastern dialects, and is sometimes considered a separate language. When King Sejong drove the Jurchen from what is now the northernmost part of North Hamgyong Province in 1434, he established six garrisons (Yukchin) in the bend of the Tumen River – Kyŏnghŭng, Kyŏngwŏn, Onsŏng, Chongsŏng, Hoeryŏng and Puryŏng – populated by immigrants from southeastern Korea. The speech of their descendants is thus markedly distinct from other Hamgyong dialects, and preserves many archaisms. In particular, Yukchin was unaffected by the palatalization found in most other dialects. About 10 percent of Korean speakers in Central Asia use the Yukchin dialect.

== Proto-Koreanic ==
Koreanic is a relatively shallow language family. Modern varieties show limited variation, most of which can be treated as derived from Late Middle Korean (15th century). The few exceptions indicate a date of divergence only a few centuries earlier, following the unification of the peninsula by Silla. Thus proto-Koreanic is reconstructed largely by applying internal reconstruction to Middle Korean, supplemented with philological analysis of the fragmentary records of Old Korean.

=== Phonology ===
A relatively simple inventory of consonants is reconstructed for Proto-Koreanic:

Proto-Korean consonants
	Bilabial	Alveolar	Palatal	Velar/Glottal
Stop	*p	*t	*c	*k
Nasal	*m	*n		*ŋ
Fricative		*s		*h
Tap		*r		
Approximant			*j	

Many of the consonants in later forms of Korean are secondary developments:

- The reinforced consonants of modern Korean arose from consonant clusters *sC, *pC or *psC, becoming phonemically distinct after the Late Middle Korean period.
- The aspirated consonants of Middle and modern Korean similarly arose from clusters *Ck or *Ch. There is some disagreement over whether aspirates were already a distinct series in the Old Korean period. However, it seems clear that the process began with *t and *c, extended to *p and finally to *k.
- Late Middle Korean had a series of voiced fricatives, /β/ ⟨ㅸ⟩, /z/ ⟨ㅿ⟩ and /ɦ/ ⟨ㆁ⟩. These occurred only in limited environments, and are believed to have arisen from lenition of /p/, /s/ and /k/, respectively. These fricatives have disappeared in most modern dialects, but some dialects in the southeast and northeast (including Yukchin) retain /p/, /s/ and /k/ in these words.

Middle Korean /l/ ⟨ㄹ⟩ does not occur initially in native words, a typological characteristic shared with "Altaic" languages. Some, but not all, occurrences of /l/ are attributed to lenition of /t/. Distinctions in the phonographic use of the Chinese characters 乙 and 尸 suggest that Old Korean probably had two sounds corresponding to later Korean l. The second of these is often spelled lh in Middle Korean, and may reflect an earlier cluster with an obstruent.

Late Middle Korean had seven vowels. Based on loans from Middle Mongolian and transcriptions in the Jìlín lèishì, Ki-Moon Lee argued for a Korean Vowel Shift between the 13th and 15th centuries, a chain shift involving five of these vowels. William Labov found that this proposed shift followed different principles to all the other chain shifts he surveyed. The philological evidence for the shift has also been challenged. An analysis based on Sino-Korean readings leads to a more conservative system:

Old Korean vowels and Middle Korean reflexes
	Front	Central	Back
Close	*i > [i] ⟨ㅣ⟩	*ɨ > [ɨ] ⟨ㅡ⟩	*u > [u] ⟨ㅜ⟩
Mid	*e > [ə] ⟨ㅓ⟩	*ə > [ʌ] ⟨ㆍ⟩	*o > [o] ⟨ㅗ⟩
Open		*a > [a] ⟨ㅏ⟩	

The vowels *ɨ > [ɨ] and *ə > [ʌ] have a limited distribution in Late Middle Korean, suggesting that unaccented *ɨ and *ə underwent syncope. They may also have merged with *e in accented initial position or following *j. Some authors have proposed that Late Middle Korean [jə] ⟨ㅕ⟩ reflects an eighth Proto-Korean vowel, based on its high frequency and an analysis of tongue root harmony.

The Late Middle Korean script assigns to each syllable one of three pitch contours: low (unmarked), high (one dot) or rising (two dots). The rising tone may have been longer in duration, and is believed to be secondary, arising from a contraction of a syllable with low pitch with one of high pitch. Pitch levels after the first high or rising tone were not distinctive, so that Middle Korean had a pitch accent rather than a full tone system. In the proto-language, accent was probably not distinctive for verbs, but may have been for nouns, though with a preference for accent on the final syllable.

=== Morphosyntax ===
Korean uses several postnominal particles to indicate case and other relationships. The modern nominative case suffix -i is derived from an earlier ergative case marker *-i.

In modern Korean, verbs are bound forms that cannot appear without one or more inflectional suffixes. In contrast, Old Korean verb stems could be used independently, particularly in verb-verb compounds, where the first verb was typically an uninflected root.

=== Vocabulary ===
Old Korean pronouns were written with the Chinese characters for the corresponding Chinese pronouns, so their pronunciation must be inferred from Middle Korean forms. The known personal pronouns are *na 'I', *uri 'we' and *ne 'you'.

Koreanic numerals
	Proto-Korean (Whitman)	Jilin leishi (Note: Readings in Late Middle Chinese)		Late Middle Korean	Modern Korean	Jeju
1	*hət(V)- / *hətan	河屯	ɣa-dun	hʌnáh	hana	hʌna
2	*tupɨr	途孛	du-buaj	tǔlh	tul	tul
3	*se- / *seki	洒	ʂaj	sə̌jh	set	swis
4	*ne / *neki	迺	naj	nə̌jh	net	nuis
5	*tasə	打戍	da(ŋ)-ʂy	tasʌ́s	tasʌt	tasʌs
6	*jəsəs	逸戍	jit-ʂy	jəsɨ́s	jʌsʌt	jəsəs
7	*nirkup	一急	ʔjit-kip	nilkúp	ilɡop	ilkop
8	*jətərp	逸答	jit-tap	jətɨ́lp	jʌdʌl	jʌtʌp
9	*ahop	鴉好	ʔja-xaw	ahóp	ahop	aop
10	*jer	噎	ʔjiat	jə́lh	jʌl	jəl

== Typology and areal features ==
Modern Koreanic varieties have a three-way contrast between plain, aspirated and reinforced stops and affricates, but Proto-Korean is reconstructed with a single set, like Proto-Japonic and Ainu but unlike Tungusic, Mongolic and Turkic, which feature a voicing contrast. Korean also resembles Japonic and Ainu in having a single liquid consonant, while its continental neighbours tend to distinguish /l/ and /r/.

Most modern varieties (except Jeju and a few northern dialects) have a form of accent, marked by vowel length in central dialects and pitch in the northeast and southeast. The position of this accent is determined by the first high pitch syllable in Middle Korean. A similar pitch accent is found in Japonic and Ainu languages, but not Tungusic, Mongolic or Turkic.

Like other languages in northeast Asia, Korean has agglutinative morphology and head-final word order, with subject–object–verb order, modifiers preceding nouns, and postpositions (particles).

== Proposed external relationships ==
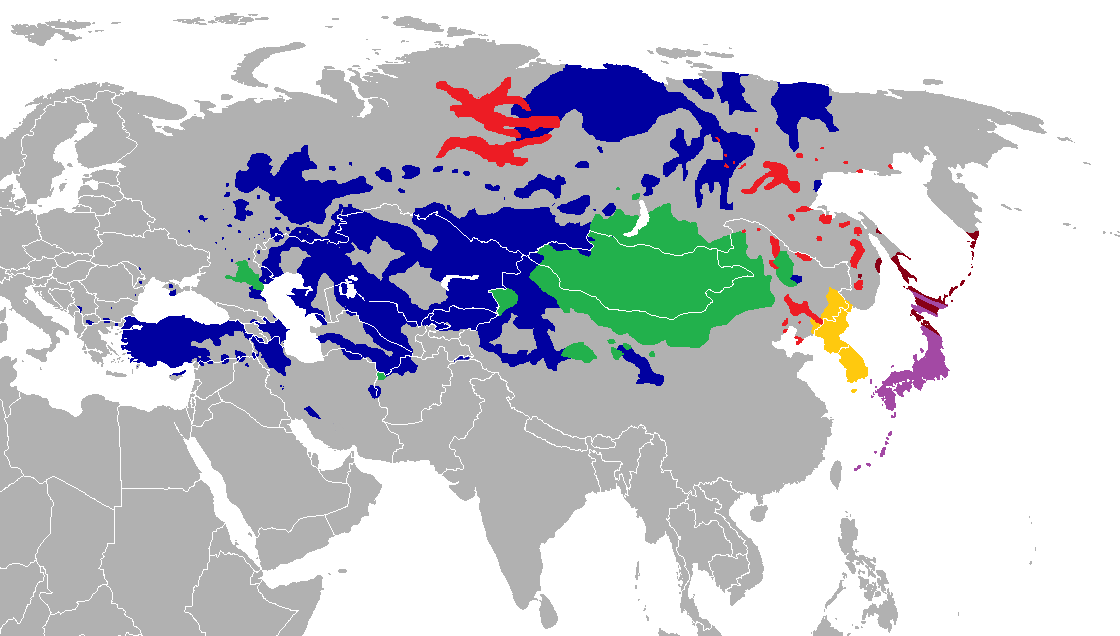
Larger language families of northeast Asia: Turkic Mongolic Tungusic / Koreanic Japonic Ainu

Northeast Asia is home to several relatively shallow language families. There have been several attempts to link Korean with other language families, with the most common being the controversial "Altaic" group (Tungusic, Mongolic and Turkic) and Japonic. However, none of these attempts has succeeded in demonstrating a common descent for Koreanic and any other language family. Larger proposed groupings subsuming these hypotheses, such as Nostratic and Eurasiatic, have even less support.

=== Altaic ===
The Altaic proposal, grouping Tungusic, Mongolic and Turkic, emerged in the 19th century as a residue when the larger Ural–Altaic grouping was abandoned. Korean was added to the proposal by Gustaf Ramstedt in 1924, and others later added Japanese. The languages share features such as agglutinative morphology, subject–object–verb order and postpositions. Many cognates have been proposed, and attempts have been made to reconstruct a proto-language.

The Altaic theory was incorporated into the influential two-wave migration model of Korean ethnic history proposed in the 1970s by the archaeologist Kim Won-yong, who attributed cultural transitions in prehistoric Korea to migrations of distinct ethnic groups from the north. The appearance of Neolithic Jeulmun pottery was interpreted as a migration of a Paleosiberian group, while the arrival of bronze was attributed to a Tungusic migration of the ancestral Korean population, identified with the Yemaek of later Chinese sources. South Korean culture-historians tended to project contemporary Korean homogeneity into the distant past, assuming that a preformed Korean people arrived in the peninsula from elsewhere, ignoring the possibility of local evolution and interaction. However, no evidence of these migrations has been found, and archaeologists now believe that the Korean peninsula and adjacent areas of eastern Manchuria have been continuously occupied since the Late Pleistocene. The projection of the Yemaek back to this period has also been criticized as unjustified.

Moreover, most comparativists no longer accept the core Altaic family itself, even without Korean, believing most of the commonalities to be the result of prolonged contact. The shared features turned out to be rather common among languages across the world, and typology is no longer considered evidence of a genetic relationship. While many cognates are found between adjacent groups, few are attested across all three. The proposed sound correspondences have also been criticized for invoking too many phonemes, such as the four phonemes that are said to have merged as *y in proto-Turkic. Similarly, Koreanic *r is said to result from the merger of four proto-Altaic liquids.

In any case, most of the proposed matches with Korean were from the neighbouring Tungusic group. A detailed comparison of Korean and Tungusic was published by Kim Dongso in 1981, but it has been criticized for teleological reconstructions, failing to distinguish loanwords, and poor semantic matches, leaving too few comparisons to establish correspondences. Much of this work relies on comparisons with modern languages, particularly Manchu, rather than reconstructed proto-Tungusic. Many of the best matches are found only in Manchu and closely related languages, and thus could be the result of language contact.

=== Japonic ===
Scholars outside of Korea have given greater attention to possible links with Japonic, which were first investigated by William George Aston in 1879. The phoneme inventories of the two proto-languages are similar, with a single series of obstruents, a single liquid consonant and six or seven vowels. Samuel Martin, John Whitman and others have proposed hundreds of possible cognates, with sound correspondences. Most of the shared words concern the natural environment and agriculture.

However, Koreanic and Japonic have a long history of interaction, which may explain their grammatical similarities and makes it difficult to distinguish inherited cognates from ancient loanwords. Most linguists studying the Japonic family believe that it was brought to the Japanese archipelago from the Korean peninsula around 700–300 BC by wet-rice farmers of the Yayoi culture. Placename glosses in the Samguk sagi and other evidence suggest that Japonic languages persisted in central and southwestern parts of the peninsula into the early centuries of the common era.

The early Japanese state received many cultural innovations via Korea, which may also have influenced the language. Alexander Vovin points out that Old Japanese contains several pairs of words of similar meaning in which one word matches a Korean form, while the other is also found in Ryukyuan and Eastern Old Japanese. He suggests that the former group represent early loans from Korean, and that Old Japanese morphemes should not be assigned a Japonic origin unless they are also attested in Southern Ryukyuan or Eastern Old Japanese, which reduces the proposed cognates to fewer than a dozen.

After filtering out early loanwords, following the procedure suggested by Vovin (2010), Whitman (2012) tries to isolate potential cognates substantially more rigorously than in older literature, including his own works, affirming a relationship between Japonic and Korean, but he stresses that it is relatively distant.

=== Others ===
A link with Dravidian was first proposed by Homer Hulbert in 1905 and explored by Morgan Clippinger in 1984, but has attracted little interest since the 1980s. There have also been proposals to link Korean with Austronesian, but these have few adherents.

== Early history ==
All modern varieties are descended from the language of Unified Silla. Evidence for the earlier linguistic history of the Korean peninsula is extremely sparse. Various proposals have been based on archaeological and ethnological theories and vague references in early Chinese histories. There is a tendency in Korea to assume that all languages formerly spoken on the peninsula were early forms of Korean, but the evidence indicates much greater linguistic variety in the past.

=== Early Chinese descriptions ===
Chinese commanderies (in purple) and their eastern neighbours mentioned in the Records of the Three Kingdoms

Chinese histories provide the only contemporaneous descriptions of peoples of the Korean peninsula and eastern Manchuria in the early centuries of the common era. They contain impressionistic remarks about the customs and languages of the area based on second-hand reports, and sometimes contradict one another. The later Korean histories lack any discussion of languages.

In 108 BC, the Chinese Han dynasty conquered northern Korea and established the Four Commanderies of Han, the most important being Lelang, which was centred on the basin of the Taedong River and lasted until 314 AD. Chapter 30 of the Records of the Three Kingdoms (Note: The title refers to the Chinese Three Kingdoms period (220–280 AD), not the Three Kingdoms of Korea (4th to 7th centuries).) (late 3rd century) and Chapter 85 of the Book of the Later Han (5th century) contain parallel accounts of peoples neighbouring the commanderies, apparently both based on a survey carried out by the Chinese state of Wei after their defeat of Goguryeo in 244.

To the north and east, the Buyeo, Goguryeo and Ye were described as speaking similar languages, with the language of Okjeo only slightly different from them. Their languages were said to differ from that of the Yilou to the northeast. The latter language is completely unattested, but is believed, on the basis of the description of the people and their location, to have been Tungusic.

To the south lay the Samhan ('three Han'), Mahan, Byeonhan and Jinhan, who were described in quite different terms from Buyeo and Goguryeo. (Note: The name Han (韓) is unrelated to the Chinese Han dynasty, but is analysed as Korean ha 'great' with the nominalizer suffix -n, meaning 'chieftain'.) The Mahan were said to have a different language from Jinhan, but the two accounts differ on the relationship between the languages of Byeonhan and Jinhan, with the Records of the Three Kingdoms describing them as similar, but the Book of the Later Han referring to differences. The Zhōuhú (州胡) people on a large island to the west of Mahan (possibly Jeju) were described as speaking a different language to Mahan.

Based on this text, Ki-Moon Lee divided the languages spoken on the Korean peninsula at that time into Puyŏ and Han groups. Lee originally proposed that these were two branches of a Koreanic language family, a view that was widely adopted by scholars in Korea. He later argued that the Puyŏ languages were intermediate between Korean and Japanese. Alexander Vovin and James Marshall Unger argue that the Han languages were Japonic, and were replaced by Koreanic Puyŏ languages in the 4th century. Some authors believe that the Puyŏ languages belong to the Tungusic family. Others believe that there is insufficient evidence to support a classification.

=== Three Kingdoms period ===
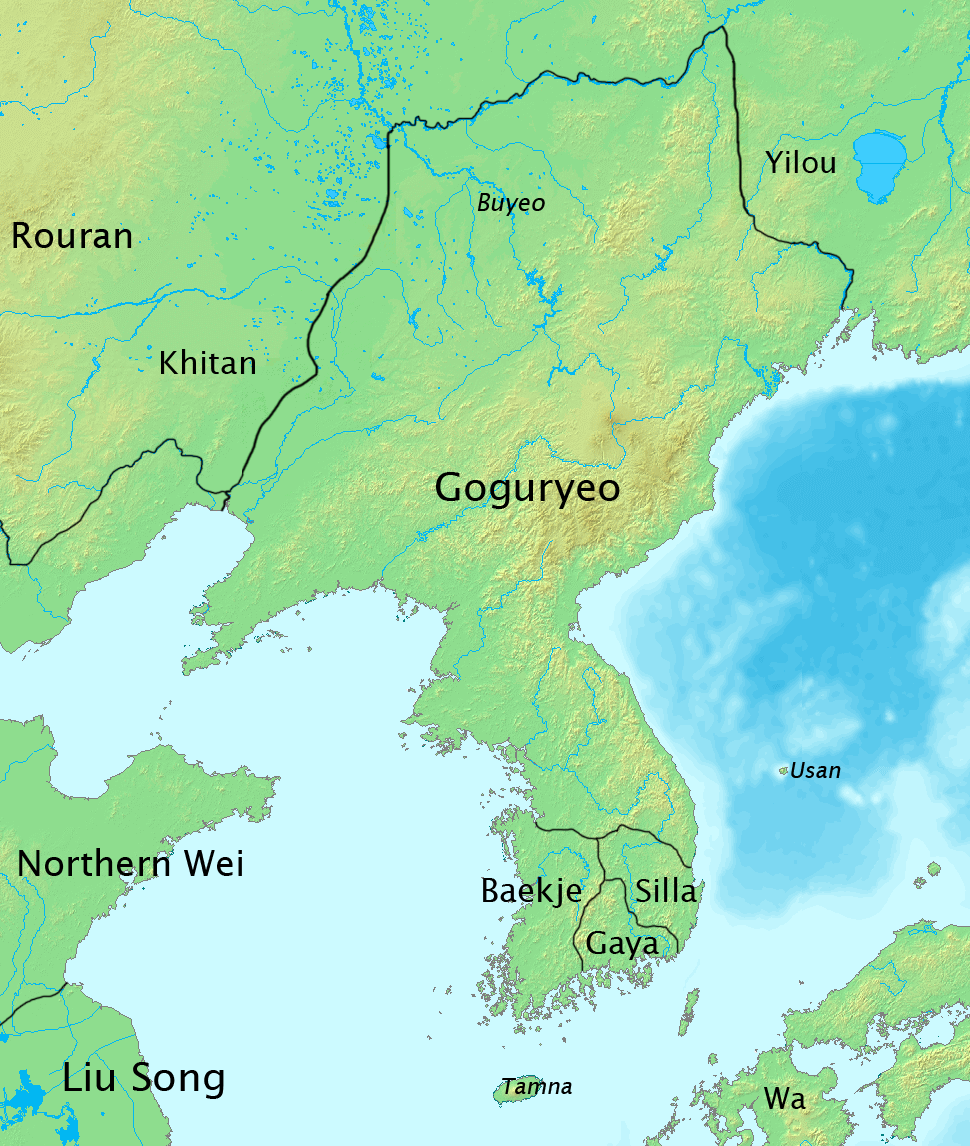
The Korean peninsula in the late 5th century

As Chinese power ebbed in the early 4th century, centralized states arose on the peninsula. The Lelang commandery was overrun by Goguryeo in 314. In the south, Baekje, the Gaya confederacy and Silla arose from Mahan, Byeonhan and Jinhan respectively. (Note: Traditional histories give founding dates for Baekje and Silla of 18 BC and 57 BC respectively, and these dates are repeated in textbooks, but archaeological and documentary evidence indicates that these kingdoms were founded in the 4th century.) Thus began the Three Kingdoms period, referring to Goguryeo, Baekje and Silla (Gaya was absorbed by Silla in the 6th century). The period ended in the late 7th century, when Silla conquered the other kingdoms in alliance with the Chinese Tang dynasty and then expelled the Tang from the peninsula.

Linguistic evidence from these states is sparse and, being recorded in Chinese characters, difficult to interpret. Most of these materials come from Silla, whose language is generally believed to be ancestral to all extant Korean varieties. There is no agreement on the relationship of Sillan to the languages of the other kingdoms. The issue is politically charged in Korea, with scholars who point out differences being accused by nationalists of trying to "divide the homeland". Apart from placenames, whose interpretation is controversial, data on the languages of Goguryeo and Baekje is extremely sparse.

The most widely cited evidence for Goguryeo is chapter 37 of the Samguk sagi, a history of the Three Kingdoms period written in Classical Chinese and compiled in 1145 from earlier records that are no longer extant. This chapter surveys the part of Goguryeo annexed by Silla, listing pronunciations and meanings of placenames, from which a vocabulary of 80 to 100 words has been extracted. Although the pronunciations recorded using Chinese characters are difficult to interpret, some of these words appear to resemble Tungusic, Korean or Japonic words. Scholars who take these words as representing the language of Goguryeo have come to a range of conclusions about the language, some holding that it was Koreanic, others that it was Japonic, and others that it was somehow intermediate between the three families.

Other authors point out that most of the place names come from central Korea, an area captured by Goguryeo from Baekje and other states in the 5th century, and none from the historical homeland of Goguryeo north of the Taedong River. These authors suggest that the place names reflect the languages of those states rather than that of Goguryeo. This would explain why they seem to reflect multiple language groups. It is generally agreed that these glosses demonstrate that Japonic languages were once spoken in part of the Korean peninsula, but there is no consensus on the identity of the speakers.

A small number of inscriptions have been found in Goguryeo, the earliest being the Gwanggaeto Stele (erected in Ji'an in 414). All are written in Classical Chinese, but feature some irregularities, including occasional use of object–verb order (as found in Korean and other northeast Asian languages) instead of the usual Chinese verb–object order, and particles 之 and 伊, for which some authors have proposed Korean interpretations. Alexander Vovin argues that the Goguryeo language was the ancestor of Koreanic, citing a few Goguryeo words in Chinese texts such as the Book of Wei (6th century) that appear to have Korean etymologies, as well as Koreanic loanwords in Jurchen and Manchu.

The Book of Liang (635) states that the language of Baekje was the same as that of Goguryeo. According to Korean traditional history, the kingdom of Baekje was founded by immigrants from Goguryeo who took over Mahan. The Japanese history Nihon Shoki, compiled in the early 8th century from earlier documents, including some from Baekje, records 42 Baekje words. These are transcribed as Old Japanese syllables, which are restricted to the form (C)V, limiting the precision of the transcription. About half of them appear to be Koreanic. Based on these words and a passage in the Book of Zhou (636), Kōno Rokurō argued that the kingdom of Baekje was bilingual, with the gentry speaking a Puyŏ language and the common people a Han language.
