= Jaegaseung =

Ethnic Jurchens in northeastern Korea

재가승
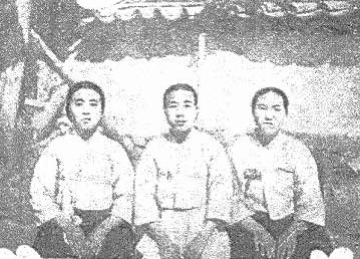
- Jaegaseung women in 1932

Total population
- 1,031 households (1957)

Regions with significant populations
- Ryanggang Province, North Hamgyong Province and Rason

Languages
- Yukjin dialect of Korean

Religion
- Buddhism

Related ethnic groups
- Manchus, Sibes, Koreans, other Tungusic peoples

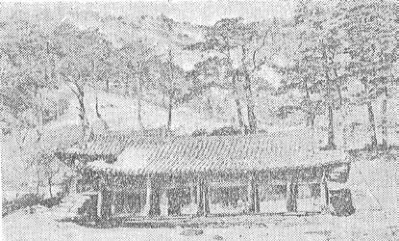
A Buddhist temple built by Korean Jaegaseung minority

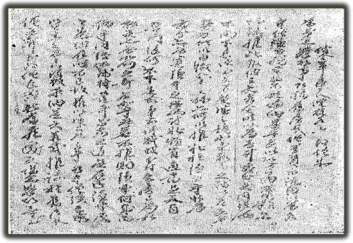
An example of oatmeal paper traditionally produced by Jaegaseung minority in Korea

Jaegaseung (Korean: 재가승; Hanja: 在家僧; lit. 'monks who live in houses') were descendants of Jurchen people who lived in northeastern Korea. They formed villages of married lay monks and produced oatmeal paper called hwangji (黃紙) that was used to pay their taxes. The monastic identity of the lay monks was seen as anti-socialist by the government of North Korea, and, consequently, the Jaegaseung were forcibly assimilated into Korean culture on the orders of North Korean president Kim Il Sung.

== Origins and history ==
The mountains of northern Hamgyŏng Province were traditionally inhabited by the Jurchens, the progenitor of the Manchu people. In the mid-fifteenth century, King Sejong conquered the region as far north as the Tumen River, which even today marks Korea's northern border, and established Korean colonies in the area. Many Jurchens accepted Korean hegemony and played crucial roles in frontier defense against other Jurchen tribes more hostile to Korean presence. By the sixteenth century, the Jurchens living under Korean rule were often married to ethnic Koreans and had become increasingly agricultural. They were also economically and militarily linked to the central Korean state. At the same time, they retained close contacts with independent Jurchens across the Tumen.

By the late sixteenth century, however, conflicts over land between indigenous Jurchens and Korean settlers were increasingly frequent. The Jurchen chieftain Nitanggae rebelled in 1583, severely undermining the Korean state's control of the area. The crisis was exacerbated by the large-scale Japanese invasion in 1592 during which Katō Kiyomasa conquered large parts of Hamgyŏng, leading to a breakdown of the Korean administration and major conflicts between Jurchens and Koreans.

Beginning in around 1590, independent Jurchen chieftains such as Nurhaci and Bujantai were competing for hegemony over their cousins in Korean territory. Having routed Bujantai in 1607, Nurhaci successfully removed most Jurchens in northern Hamgyŏng into his newfound kingdom north of the Tumen between 1607 and 1609. Nurhaci's Jurchens would eventually adopt a new Manchu identity in 1635 and go on to conquer China, founding China's final imperial dynasty. Nurhaci and his successors continued to demand the forcible "repatriation" of Jurchens in Korea until 1644, although some Jurchens successfully evaded deportation and remained in Korea with the support of sympathetic Korean authorities.

It is generally agreed that the Jaegaseung were descendants of these Jurchen communities who avoided capture, and assimilated into Korean society.

== Culture ==
Ultimately, although many cultural practices of the Jaegaseung were identical or similar to the folk traditions of Northern Hamgyong province, the community still maintained several distinctive and divergent customs. The community, unlike their neighbours, wore red clothes during Jesa rites, cremated their dead, allowed women to wear trousers, and were largely vegetarian with the exception of important days. If a Jaegaseung female marries a man outside of the community, then the man was to move into the Jaegaseung community and shave his head.

The homes of Jaegaseung were described as composing of one, big room and a fence around the house. Due the influence of shamanism, they did not plant trees around their homes. The villages also had a hierarchy, with each Jaegaseung settlement having a chief, who was well versed in the Buddhist scriptures and ceremonies. The chief would also take care of administrative tasks such as taxes or tribute.

When a member of the community was sick, a ceremony called 'Daesangwi' (대산귀) was to be held by the Tumen river in order to ensure the wellbeing of the person and village. The rites involved offerings of rice cakes and a pig in front of a wooden pole, and were reported to last for an entire night. The ceremony was unique to the Jaegaseung communities, and was not practiced by other residents of Northern Hamgyong.

Jaegaseung girls and women were notorious in mainstream Korean society for always exposing their breasts even in public, which was considered scandalous by other Koreans.

Some Jaegaseung refugees who fled to South Korea during the Korean War were known to have preserved some cultural aspects of their communities, and one work song regarding the community's traditional method of smelting iron was broadcast on South Korean radio.

== Language ==
Despite their isolation from other residents in the area, the Jaegaseung communities spoke the typical Yukjin dialect of the region.

However, a difference between the dialect of the Jaegaseung and other speakers of Yukjin Korean was still noticeable as of the 1930s, to the point that instances of difficulty in communication between local administrative officials and Jaegaseung villages were not uncommon.

Some examples of vocabulary listed as being exclusively used by the Jaegaseung community of North Hamgyong Province include the terms 양소래없다 (yangsoraeeopda) and 덕새없다 (deoksaeeopda), used to denote someone who was immature or lacked common sense. Otherwise, other unique vocabulary among the Jaegaseung include 무새 (musae, for what reason), 영에 (yeong'e, powdered bean for rice cakes) and 나마리 (namari, edible plants, herbs).

The only language considered vulgar among the Jaegaseung was the phrase '범이야' ('It's a tiger'), which likely is a reflection of the community's fear of tigers, which were historically common in the region.

== See also ==
- Buddhist monasticism
- Ethnic minorities in North Korea
- Ethnoreligious group
- Korean Buddhism
- Cultural genocide
