= North Korean standard language =

Language-Alphabet system of North Korea

- 문화어
- Native to: North Korea
- Ethnicity: Koreans
- Era: Since second half of 20th century
- Language family: Koreanic: Korean; North Korean standard language
- Early forms: Old Korean language: Middle Korean language; Korean language
- Writing system: Chosŏn'gŭl

Official status
- Official language in: North Korea
- Regulated by: The Language Research Institute, Academy of Social Science (사회과학원 어학연구소)

Language codes
- ISO 639-3: –

- North Korean standard language
- Hangul: 문화어
- Hanja: 文化語
- RR: Munhwaeo
- MR: Munhwaŏ
- IPA: /munhwɐʌ/

North Korean standard language or Munhwaŏ (Korean: 문화어; Hancha: 文化語; lit. '"cultural language"') is the North Korean standard version of the Korean language. Munhwaŏ was adopted as the standard in 1966. The adopting proclamation stated that the Pyongan dialect spoken in the North Korean capital Pyongyang and its surroundings should be the basis for Munhwaŏ. Though this view is supported by some linguists, others posit that Munhwaŏ remains "firmly rooted" in the Seoul dialect, which had been the national standard for centuries. Thus, while the first group indicate that, besides the large divergence at the level of vocabulary, differences between the North and South Korean standards also include phonetic and phonological features, as well as stress and intonation, the others consider these differences attributable to replacement of Sino-Korean vocabulary and other loanwords with pure Korean words, or the Northern ideological preference for "the speech of the working class" which includes some words considered non-standard in the South.

== Background ==
An example of North Korean standard language as spoken by a translator and Kim Jong Un at the 2018 North Korea–United States Singapore Summit

Following the liberation of Korea in 1945, the Democratic People's Republic of Korea continued to follow the Korean language guidelines as defined by the Korean Language Society in 1933 with the "Proposal for Unified Korean Orthography" (한글 맞춤법 통일안) and in 1936 with the "Collection of Assessed Standard Korean Words" (사정한 조선어 표준말 모음). In 1954, the 1933 proposal was replaced by a new system (조선어 철자법) by the North Korean government in which thirteen words were slightly modified. Although the reformation created little difference, from this point the languages spoken by people on both sides on the Korean peninsula only grew in difference.

During the emergence of the Juche idea in the 1960s, Kim Il Sung coordinated an effort to purify the Korean language from English, Japanese, and Russian loanwords as well as words with less common Hancha characters, replacing them with new words derived from native Korean words. In a lecture by Kim Il Sung on 3 January 1964, titled "Some problems to develop the Korean language" (조선어를 발전시키 위한 몇가지 문제), he emphasized the significance of the usage of language as a weapon in the socialist construction of all areas of development, and tried to align with the global trend of change as well as preserving ethnic uniqueness.

Thus, North Korea began to refer to its own dialect as "cultural language" (문화어) as a reference to its return to words of Korean cultural origin, in juxtaposition to South Korea's reference to its own dialect as "standard language" (표준어). This includes the use of some archaic vocabulary and grammar.

Vocabulary maintenance in North Korea traces its origins to the 1930s' partisan struggle against Japan, where a shift in vocabulary was influenced by new political and revolutionary terms introduced by Kim Il Sung's partisans. From 1945 to 1949, the focus was on eradicating illiteracy and abandoning Chinese characters, with more structured vocabulary maintenance beginning in 1954. In the second period, efforts were made to simplify and standardize academic, technical, and Sino-Korean terms, leading to some degree of language differentiation between the North and South. The third period emphasized the language's national characteristics, significantly increasing this differentiation by replacing Sino-Korean terms with pure Korean ones, which led South Korean scholars to study the language as a strategic countermeasure. North Korea's approach to vocabulary management, consisting of maintenance, distribution, and control, is executed based on a centralized, top-down policy, which fundamentally differs from South Korea's approach.

Vocabulary maintenance in North Korea principally targets words of foreign origin, classified into Sino-Korean words and loan words. During its third phase of language policy, efforts were made to preserve the national characteristics of the Korean language by substituting foreign-derived words with native Korean ones. These target words for maintenance included foreign-origin technical and scientific terms, foreign words replaceable by pure Korean ones, unadapted loan words, obsolete words, and Sino-Korean homonyms. Vocabulary maintenance approaches included discarding words representing outdated customs or concepts, implementing pure Koreanization, and adapting words. Pure Koreanization was achieved by mandating exclusive use of pure Korean words, identifying rarely used or dialectic pure Korean substitutes, activating weakly derived pure Korean words, and creating new words from pure Korean elements if no suitable replacements existed.

North Korea's vocabulary maintenance, managed mainly by the National Language Decision Committee, was recorded in a work titled "Tatumunmal", accumulating up to 50,000 words by 1976. These newly introduced words undergo a strict distribution process and become accepted as Mwunhwae, the standard language, once they are established in widespread use. Educational institutions and media play a key role in this distribution. The Korean dictionary serves to establish and control the usage of Mwunhwae vocabulary, requiring all users, including individuals and national institutions, to adhere strictly to its prescriptions. During the third period, place names and personal names were targeted for vocabulary management, seeing significant alterations to reflect national sentiment and eliminate foreign influences; the traditional naming system, based on Chinese characters representative of certain elements, also began to be disregarded, as younger generations started favoring pure Korean names.

Munhwaŏ, the standardized language in North Korea, incorporates pure Korean words from various dialects, especially the Pyongan and Hamgyong dialects. In addition to standardizing vocabulary, the language policy involves discarding vocabulary that conflicts with state ideology and exercising control over lexical meaning. The idiolect and style of Kim Il Sung, North Korea's first leader, significantly influence this language standard, as his words often become Munhwaŏ without restraint.

== See also ==
- North–South differences in the Korean language
