= Pyongan dialect =

Korean dialect

Pyŏngan
- Pyeongan
- 평안도 사투리
- Native to: North Korea, China
- Region: P'yŏng'an, Chagang, Liaoning
- Language family: Koreanic: Korean; Northern; Pyŏngan

Language codes
- ISO 639-3: –
- Glottolog: pyon1239

The Pyongan dialect (Korean: 평안도 사투리; MR: p'yŏngando sat'uri), alternatively Northwestern Korean (Korean: 서북 방언; Hancha: 西北方言; MR: sŏbuk pangŏn), is the Korean dialect of the Northwestern Korean Peninsula and neighboring parts of China.

In North Korea, the Pyongan dialect is recognized as a regional dialect. However, the country's standard language, often referred to as Munhwaŏ (문화어, Cultured Language) and claimed to be based on the speech of Pyongyang, is officially distinguished from this dialect. This position was articulated by Kim Il Sung on January 6, 1964, in "Guiding Principles for the Juche-Oriented Development of the Korean Language" (《조선어의 주체적발전의 길을 밝혀준 강령적지침》), where he stated: "Pyongyang speech (평양말, P'yŏngyangmal) is neither the indigenous speech [of the city] nor the Pyongan dialect mixed with regionalisms."

== Pronunciation ==
=== Vowels ===
In the Pyongan dialect an eight-vowel system is used (이·에·애·으·어·아·우·오). The sound of 어 is much closer to that of 오 compared to other dialects, as it is [ɔ], the rounded equivalent to South Korean [ʌ̹]. 으 is also closer to [i] than to [ɨ], (e.g. 그렇다 becomes 기렇다). However, the opposite is true after ㅅ. The palatalization that occurred for other dialects with 시 is absent in the Pyongan dialect, e.g. 싫다 becomes 슳다. There are various features that differentiate the sound of words from southwestern and midland dialects. 위, 왜, 워 and 와 are closer to an original sound of 야, 여, 요 and 유.

=== Palatalization ===
The ㄷ (d) consonant, in addition to the first syllable of ㄱ (g) and ㅎ (h) are not palatalized in the Pyongan dialect (e.g. 뎡거댱, 정거장: chyŏnggŏjyang, chŏgŏjang). Sino-Korean words beginning with ㄴ (n) in southern dialects are pronounced as ㄹ (r), as in the cases of 류행 (ryuhaeng) and 로동 (rodong).

In the example of 같이, southern Korean dialects palatize the sound to resemble the sound "ca-chi", as if it were written 가치, but Pyeonyan accents do not palatize the sound, pronouncing it phonetically as "catti".

=== Conjugation ===
Stems of the ㄷ, ㅂ, ㅅ irregulars use both forms, such as in the case of 듣다· 드드니, 들으니 (tŭtta-tŭdŭni, tŭrŭni) (listening, to hear).

== Words ==
=== Vocabulary ===
Various words used in the Pyongan dialect differ from those of other Korean dialects, such as 간나 (kanna) (sissy), 클마니 (k'ŭlmani) (father) and 클마니 (grandmother). The etymology of words such as "우틔" (ut'ŭi) (衣) arises from the Manchu language, but has been removed by the North Korean government in order to promote language purity.
