= Jilin leishi =

12th-century Chinese book on Korea

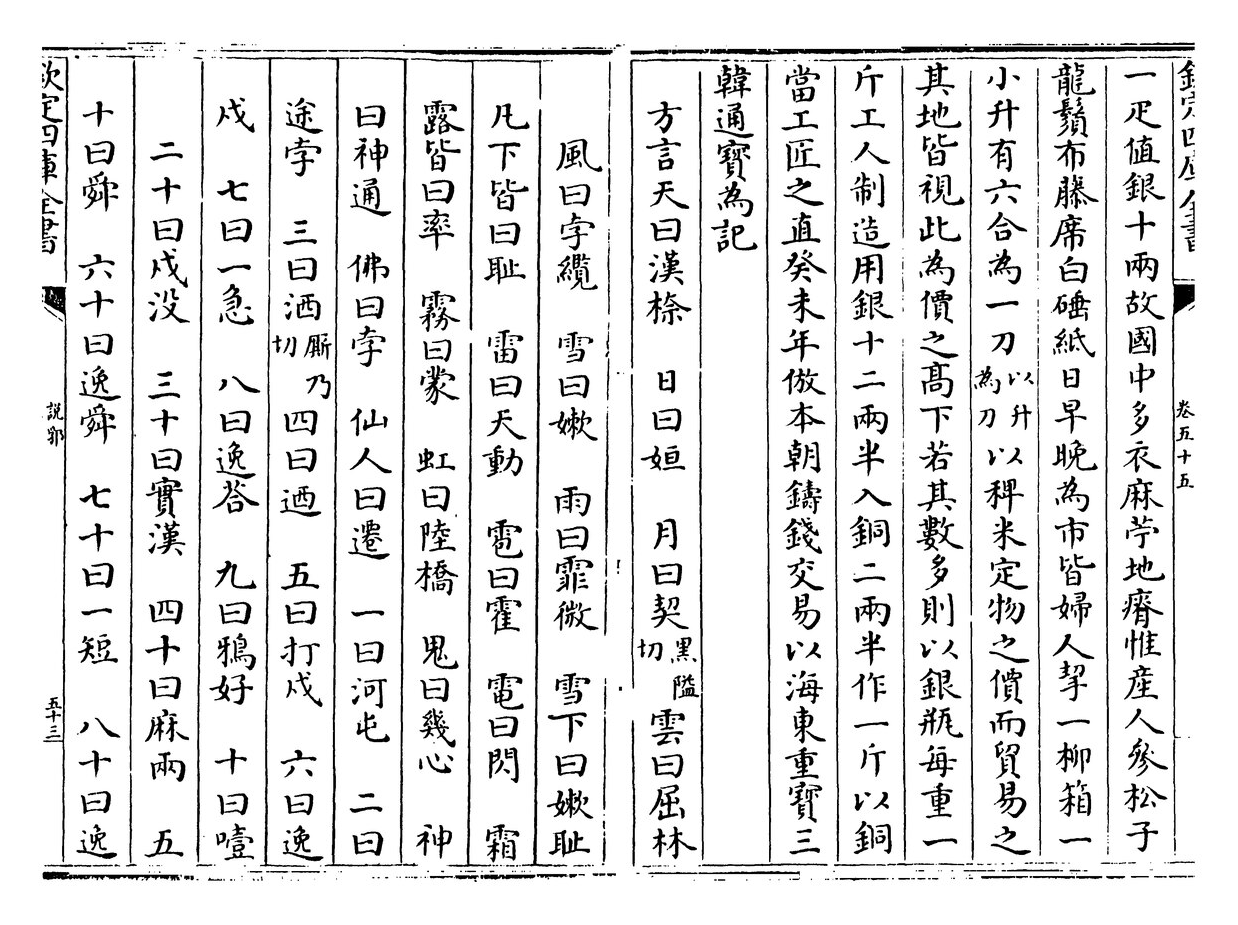
- Two pages of the Jilin leishi, including the start of the glossary

Chinese name
- Traditional Chinese: 雞林類事
- Simplified Chinese: 鸡林类事
- Literal meaning: Jilin (Korea) matters
Transcriptions
Standard Mandarin
- Hanyu Pinyin: Jīlín lèishì

Korean name
- Hangul: 계림유사
Transcriptions
- Revised Romanization: Gyerim yusa
- McCune–Reischauer: Kyerim yusa

The Jilin leishi was a Chinese book about Korea written in 1103–1104 by Sun Mu (孫穆), an officer of the Chinese Song dynasty embassy to Goryeo. The original work is lost, but fragments reproduced in later Chinese works provide vital information about Early Middle Korean.

The original work is believed to have consisted of three volumes covering the customs, government and language of Korea, with various historical documents as appendices. All that survives is excerpts quoted in two Chinese encyclopedias, the Shuō fú (說郛) from the Ming dynasty and the Gujin Tushu Jicheng (1726). The original Ming Shuō fú was itself lost, and survives in editions from 1647 and 1925, whose compilers had access to the original.

The surviving fragment of the Jilin leishi consists of a brief introduction dealing with Korean customs and government, and a glossary of over 350 Korean words and phrases, grouped in 18 semantic categories. For example, the first entry is

天曰漢捺

This indicates that the Korean word for 'sky, heaven' (Chinese 天) has a pronunciation similar to the Chinese characters 漢捺. The sounds of Song Chinese are poorly understood, but are approximated by the Late Middle Chinese of Chinese rhyme tables, in which these characters may be read as han-nat. The Late Middle Korean form of this word is hanólh. The Chinese transcription is imprecise, because the Chinese coda -t was used for several Korean dental consonants. The Chinese coda -k sometimes corresponds to Late Middle Korean -k, and sometimes to no final consonant. However, the Chinese coda -p consistently represented Korean -p.
