= Propositive mood =

Grammatical mood

The propositive mood (abbreviated PROP) expresses proposals or suggestions as a grammatical mood. An example in Korean:

가게에 간다. gage-e ganda. – "Goes to the shop." (declarative)
가게에 가라. gage-e gara. – "Go to the shop." (imperative)
→ 가게에 가자. gage-e gaja. – "Let's go to the shop." (propositive)

It is similar to the imperative mood, which expresses commands, in that it is directed to the audience.

Languages featuring a propositive mood, as distinct from an imperative, include Korean and Japanese.
