= Old Korean =

Earliest attested form of the Korean language

- Silla(n)
- Region: Southern and central Korea?
- Era: Evolved into Middle Korean in the tenth or thirteenth century
- Language family: Koreanic: Old Korean
- Early form: Proto-Koreanic
- Writing system: Idu, Hyangchal, Gugyeol

Language codes
- ISO 639-3: oko
- Glottolog: sill1240

South Korean name
- Hangul: 고대 한국어
- Hanja: 古代韓國語
- RR: Godae Hangugeo
- MR: Kodae Han'gugŏ

North Korean name
- Hangul: 고대 조선어
- Hanja: 古代朝鮮語
- RR: Godae Joseoneo
- MR: Kodae Chosŏnŏ

Old Korean (Note: Due to dialectal differences, Old Korean is known as 고대 조선어 in North Korea and 고대 한국어 in South Korea (in modern Hangul).) is the first historically documented stage of the Korean language, typified by the language of the Unified Silla period (668–935).

The boundaries of Old Korean periodization remain in dispute. Some linguists classify the sparsely attested languages of the Three Kingdoms of Korea as variants of Old Korean, while others reserve the term for the language of Silla alone. Old Korean traditionally ends with the fall of Silla in 935. This too has recently been challenged by South Korean linguists who argue for extending the Old Korean period to the mid-thirteenth century, although this new periodization is not yet fully accepted. This article focuses on the language of Silla before the tenth century.

Old Korean is poorly attested. Due to the paucity and poor quality of sources, modern linguists have "little more than a vague outline" of the characteristics of Old Korean. The only surviving literary works are a little more than a dozen vernacular poems called hyangga. Hyangga use hyangchal writing. Other sources include inscriptions on steles and wooden tablets, glosses to Buddhist sutras, and the transcription of personal and place names in works otherwise in Classical Chinese. All methods of Old Korean writing rely on logographic Hanja (Chinese characters), used to either gloss the meaning or approximate the sound of the Korean words. Thus, the phonetic value of surviving Old Korean texts is opaque. Its phoneme inventory seems to have included fewer consonants but more vowels than Middle Korean. In its typology, it was a subject–object–verb, agglutinative language, like both Middle and Modern Korean. However, Old Korean is thought to have differed from its descendants in certain typological features, including the existence of clausal nominalization and the ability of inflecting verb roots to appear in isolation.

Despite attempts to link the language to the putative Altaic family and especially to the Japonic languages, no links between Old Korean and any non-Koreanic language have been uncontroversially demonstrated.

== History and periodization ==
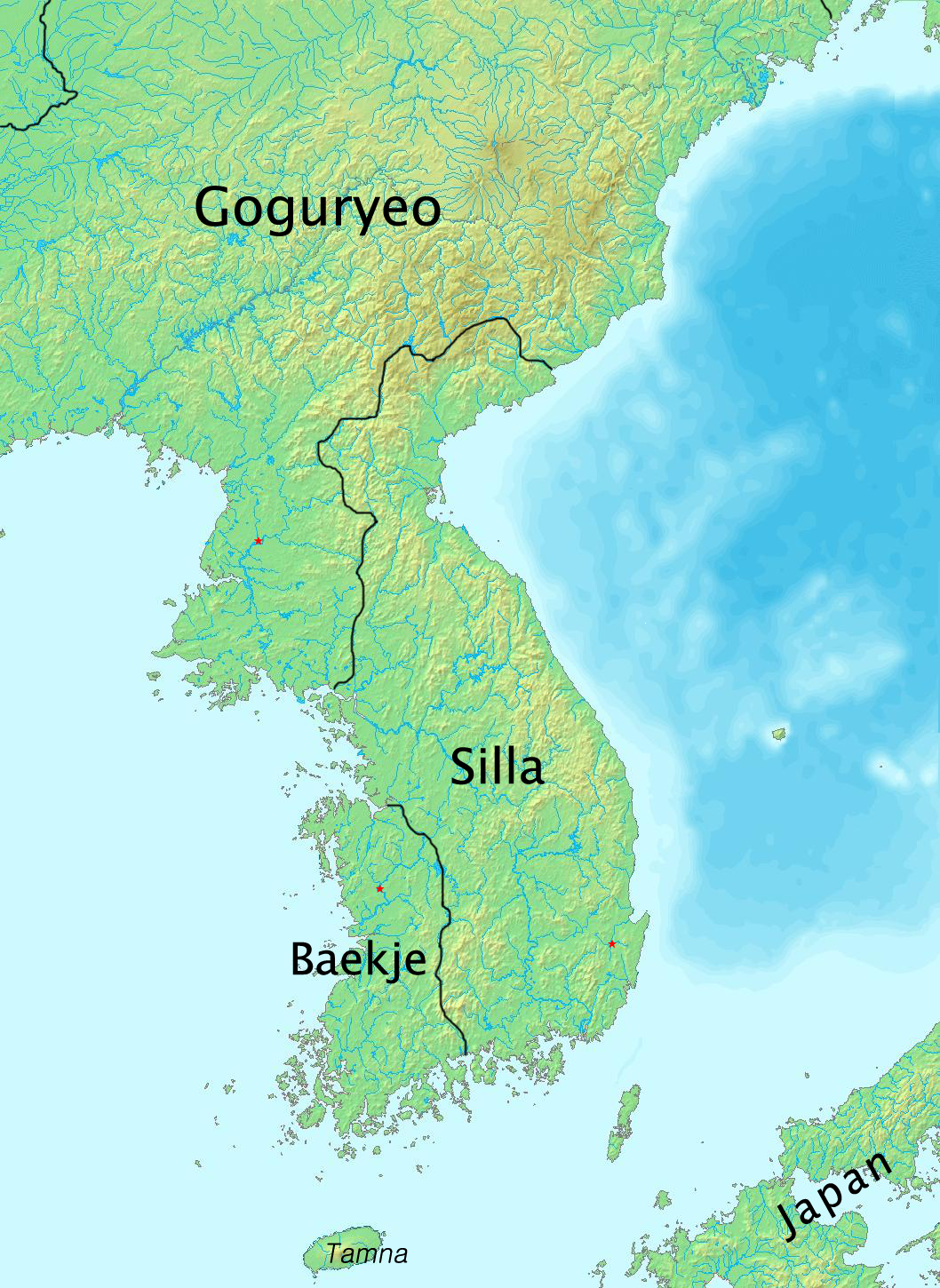
Three Kingdoms of Korea in 576

Old Korean is generally defined as the ancient Koreanic language of the Silla state (57 BCE – 936 CE), especially in its Unified period (668–936). Proto-Koreanic, the hypothetical ancestor of the Koreanic languages understood largely through the internal reconstruction of later forms of Korean, is to be distinguished from the actually historically attested language of Old Korean.

Old Korean semantic influence may be present in even the oldest discovered Silla inscription, a stele written in Classical Chinese and dated to 441 or 501. Korean syntax and morphemes are visibly attested for the first time in Silla texts of the mid- to late sixth century, and the use of such vernacular elements becomes more extensive by the Unified period.

Initially only one of the Three Kingdoms of Korea, Silla rose to ascendancy in the sixth century under monarchs Beopheung and Jinheung. After another century of conflict, the kings of Silla allied with Tang China to destroy the other two kingdoms—Baekje in 660, and Goguryeo in 668—and to unite the southern two-thirds of the Korean Peninsula under their rule. This political consolidation allowed the language of Silla to become the lingua franca of the peninsula and ultimately drove the languages of Baekje and Goguryeo to extinction, leaving the latter only as substrata in later Korean dialects. Middle Korean, and hence Modern Korean, are thus direct descendants of the Old Korean language of Silla. (Note: In 1995, on the basis of his phonological reconstruction of the hyangga texts, Alexander Vovin took the dissenting view that the language of Silla left no direct descendants. However, in 2003, Vovin refers to the Silla language as "roughly speaking, the ancestor of Middle and Modern Korean.)

Little data on the languages of the other two kingdoms survive, but most linguists agree that both were related to the language of Silla. (Note: Christopher Beckwith contends that Goguryeo was related to Japanese but not Korean. Thomas Pellard points to serious methodological flaws in Beckwith's arguments, including idiosyncratic Middle Chinese reconstructions and "questionable or unrealistic semantics".) Opinion differs as to whether to classify the Goguryeo and Baekje languages as Old Korean variants, or as related but independent languages. Ki-Moon Lee and S. Robert Ramsey argue in 2011 that evidence for mutual intelligibility is insufficient, and that linguists ought to "treat the fragments of the three languages as representing three separate corpora". Earlier in 2000, Ramsey and Iksop Lee note that the three languages are often grouped as Old Korean, but point to "obvious dissimilarities" and identify Sillan as Old Korean "in the truest sense". Nam Pung-hyun and Alexander Vovin, on the other hand, classify the languages of all three kingdoms as regional dialects of Old Korean. Other linguists, such as Lee Seungjae, group the languages of Silla and Baekje together as Old Korean while excluding that of Goguryeo. The LINGUIST List gives Silla as a synonym for Old Korean while acknowledging that the term is "often used to refer to three distinct languages".

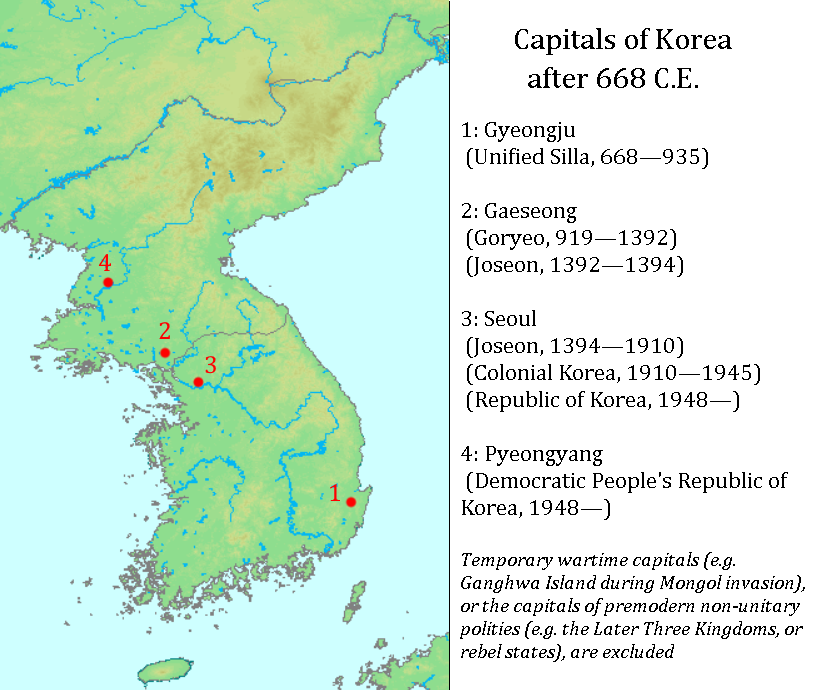
The historical capitals of Korea, including Gaegyeong and the Silla capital of Gyeongju

Silla began a protracted decline in the late eighth century. By the early tenth century, the Korean Peninsula was once more divided into three warring polities: the rump Silla state, and two new kingdoms founded by local magnates. Goryeo, one of the latter, obtained the surrender of the Silla court in 935 and reunited the country the next year. Korea's political and cultural center henceforth became the Goryeo capital of Gaegyeong (modern Gaeseong), located in central Korea. The prestige dialect of Korean also shifted from the language of Silla's southeastern heartland to the central dialect of Gaegyeong during this time. Following Ki-Moon Lee's work in the 1970s, the end of Old Korean is traditionally associated with this tenth-century change in the country's political center.

In 2003, South Korean linguist Nam Pung-hyun proposed that the Old Korean period should be extended into the mid-thirteenth century. Nam's arguments center on Korean-language glosses to the Buddhist canon. He identifies grammatical commonalities between Silla-period texts and glosses from before the thirteenth century, which contrast with the structures of post-thirteenth century glosses and of fifteenth-century Middle Korean. Such thirteenth-century changes include the invention of dedicated conditional mood markers, the restriction of the former nominalizing suffixes -n and -l to attributive functions alone, the erasing of distinctions between nominal and verbal negation, and the loss of the essentiality-marking suffix -ms.

Nam's thesis has been increasingly influential in Korean academia. In a 2012 review, Kim Yupum notes that "recent studies have a tendency to make the thirteenth century the end date [for Old Korean]... One thinks that the general periodization of Korean language history, in which [only the language] prior to the founding of Goryeo is considered Old Korean, is in need of revision." The Russian-American linguist Alexander Vovin also considers twelfth-century data to be examples of "Late Old Korean". On the other hand, linguists such as Lee Seungjae and Hwang Seon-yeop continue to use the older periodization, as do major English-language sources from the 2010s, such as the 2011 History of the Korean Language and the 2015 Blackwell Handbook of Korean Linguistics.

== Sources of Old Korean ==
=== Epigraphic sources ===
Silla inscriptions contain Old Korean elements. Idiosyncratic Chinese vocabulary suggestive of vernacular influence is found even in the oldest surviving Silla inscription, a stele in Pohang dated to either 441 or 501. These early inscriptions, however, involved "little more than subtle alterations of Classical Chinese syntax".

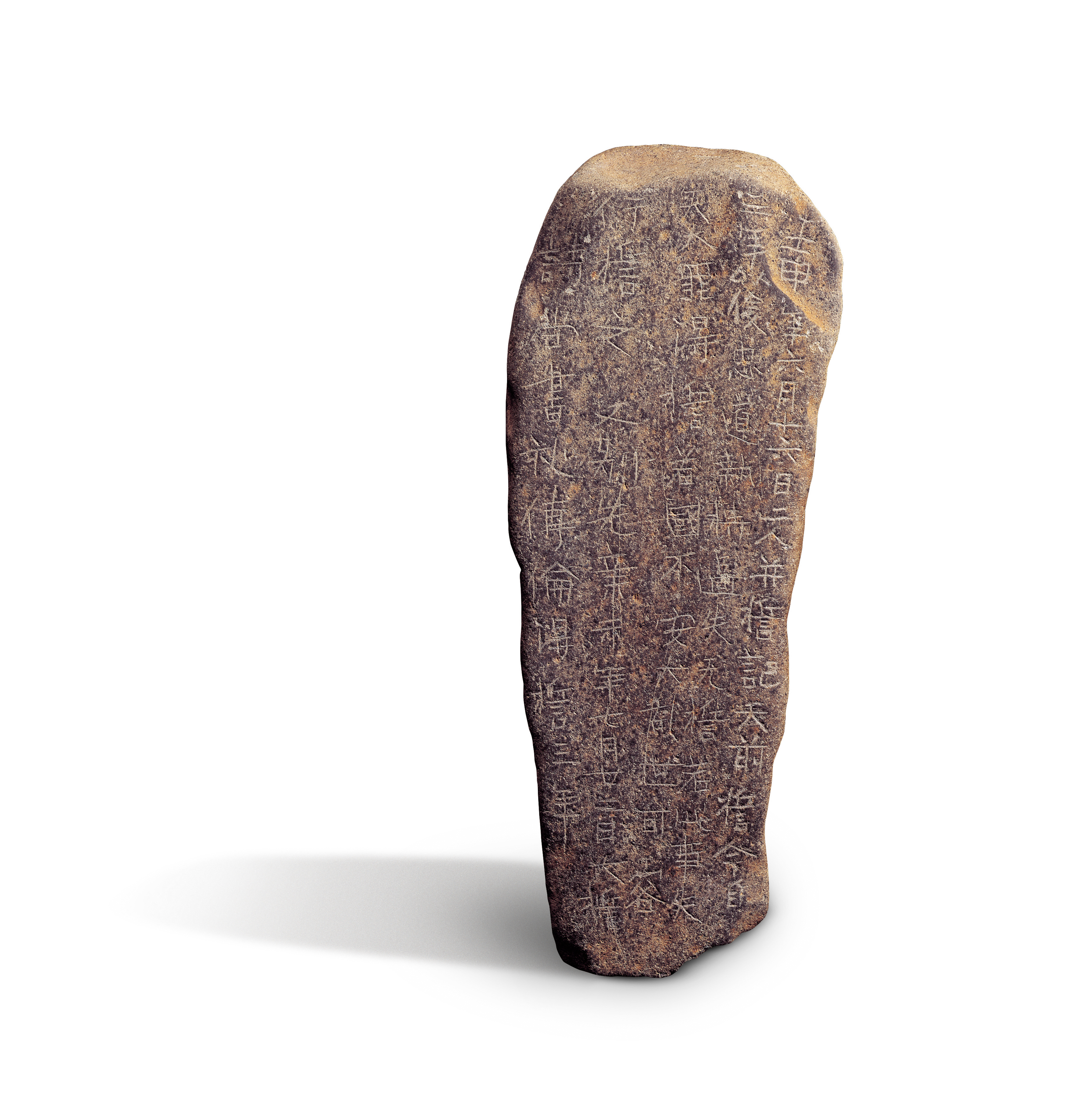
The Imsin Vow Stone of 552/612 uses Old Korean syntax.

Inscriptions of the sixth and seventh centuries show more fully developed strategies of representing Korean with Chinese characters. Some inscriptions represent functional morphemes directly through semantic Chinese equivalents. Others use only Classical Chinese vocabulary, but reorder them fully according to Korean syntax. A 551 stele commemorating the construction of a fort in Gyeongju, for instance, writes "begin to build" as 作始 (lit. 'build begin') rather than the correct Classical Chinese, 始作 (lit. 'begin build'), reflecting the Subject-object-verb word order of Korean. The Imsin Vow Stone, raised in either 552 or 612, is also illustrative:

**English** (Note: From Lee & Ramsey 2011, p. 55. The titles of the Chinese classics are translated here for the sake of English readers' convenience.)	We swear to learn in turn the Classic of Poetry, the Esteemed Documents, the Book of Rites, and the Zuo zhuan for three years.
**Original text**	詩尙書傳倫淂誓三年
**Gloss**	Poetry Esteemed Documents Rites Zhuan in-turn learn swear three years
**Classical Chinese**	誓三年倫淂詩尙書傳
**Gloss**	swear three years in-turn learn Poetry Esteemed Documents Rites Zhuan

Other sixth-century epigraphs that arrange Chinese vocabulary using Korean syntax and employ Chinese semantic equivalents for certain Korean functional morphemes have been discovered, including stelae bearing royal edicts or celebrating public works and sixth-century rock inscriptions left at Ulju by royals on tour.

Some inscriptions of the Unified Silla period continue to use only words from Classical Chinese, even as they order them according to Korean grammar. However, most inscriptions of the period write Old Korean morphemes more explicitly, relying on Chinese semantic and phonetic equivalents. These Unified-era inscriptions are often Buddhist in nature and include material carved on Buddha statues, temple bells, and pagodas.

=== Mokgan sources ===
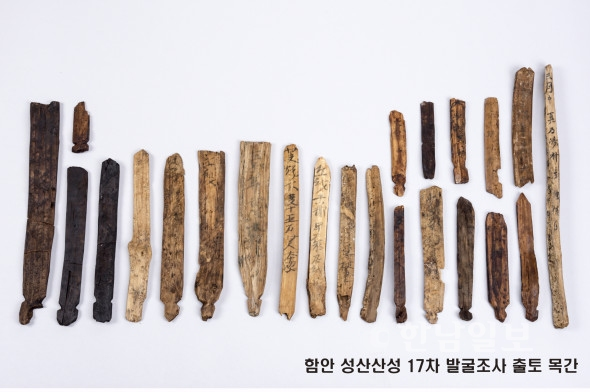
Sixth-century mokgan slips from Haman

Ancient Korean scribes often wrote on bamboo and wooden slips called mokgan. By 2016, archaeologists had discovered 647 mokgan, out of which 431 slips were from Silla. Mokgan are valuable primary sources because they were largely written by and reflect the concerns of low-ranking officials, unlike other texts that are dominated by the high elite. Since the majority of discovered texts are inventories of products, they also provide otherwise rare information about numerals, classifiers, and common nouns.

Modern mokgan research began in 1975. With the development of infrared imaging science in the 1990s, it became possible to read many formerly indecipherable texts, and a comprehensive catalog of hitherto discovered slips was published in 2004. Since its publication, scholars have actively relied on the mokgan data as an important primary source.

Mokgan are classified into two general categories. Most surviving slips are tag mokgan, which were attached to goods during transport and contain quantitative data about the product in question. Document mokgan, on the other hand, contain administrative reports by local officials. Document mokgan of extended length were common prior to Silla's conquest of the other kingdoms, but mokgan of the Unified period are primarily tag mokgan. A small number of texts belong to neither group; these include a fragmentary hyangga poem discovered in 2000 and what may be a ritual text associated with Dragon King worship. (Note: This mokgan is addressed to the "Great Dragon King", but Lee Seungjae 2017 also suggests that this may be a document mokgan conferring the honorific "great dragon" to a human nobleman.)

The earliest direct attestation of Old Korean comes from a mid-sixth century document mokgan first deciphered in full by Lee Seungjae in 2017. This slip, which contains a report by a village chieftain to a higher-ranking official, is composed according to Korean syntax and includes four uncontroversial examples of Old Korean functional morphemes (given below in bold), as well as several potential content words.

Mokgan No. 221	Reconstruction (Lee S. 2017)	Gloss (Lee S. 2017)	Translation (Lee S. 2017)
丨彡從**在**	*tasəm 從-**kje-n**	five hurry-HON-NMR	five planned to hurry
人**此**人鳴	*人-**i** 人 鳴	people-CONN people grieve	the people were all grieved
不行**遣乙**白	*不行-**kje-n-ul** 白	NEG go-HON-NMR-ACC report	"unable to go", [I] report

=== Hyangga literature ===
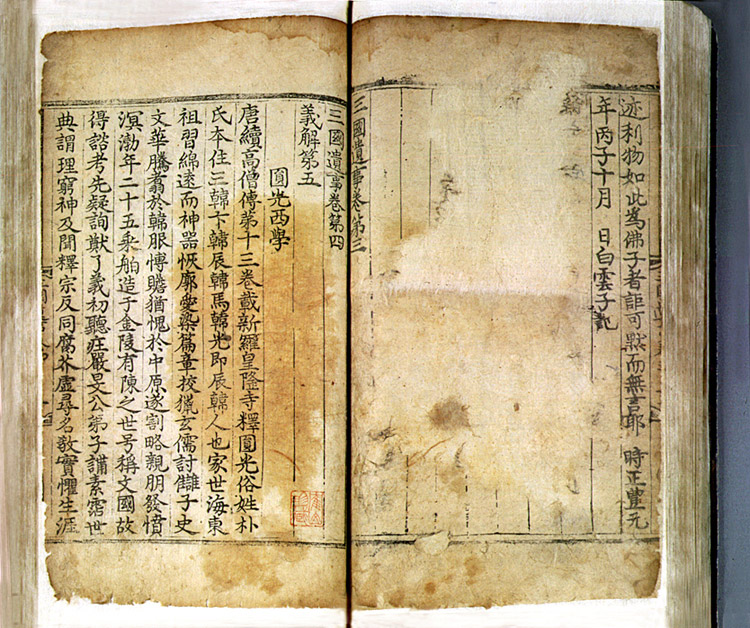
The Samguk yusa contains most surviving Silla hyangga

The only Korean-language literature that survives from Silla are vernacular poems now called hyangga (Korean: 향가; Hanja: 鄕歌), literally "local songs".

Hyangga appears to have been a flourishing genre in the Silla period, with a royally commissioned anthology published in 888. That anthology is now lost, and only twenty-five works survive. Fourteen are recorded in the Samguk yusa, a history compiled in the 1280s by the monk Iryeon, along with prose introductions that detail how the poem came to be composed. These introductions date the works to between 600 and 879. The majority of Samguk yusa poems, however, are from the eighth century. Eleven additional hyangga, composed in the 960s by the Buddhist monk Gyunyeo, are preserved in a 1075 biography of the master. Ki-Moon Lee and Ramsey consider Gyunyeo's hyangga to also represent "Silla poetry", although Nam Pung-hyun insists on significant grammatical differences between the works of the Samguk yusa and those of Gyunyeo.

Because centuries passed between the composition of hyangga works and the compilation of the works where they now survive, textual corruption may have occurred. Some poems that Iryeon attributes to the Silla period are now believed to be Goryeo-era works. Nam Pung-hyun nevertheless considers most of the Samguk yusa poems to be reliable sources for Old Korean because Iryeon would have learned the Buddhist canon through a "very conservative" dialect and thus fully understood the Silla language. Other scholars, such as Park Yongsik, point to thirteenth-century grammatical elements in the poems while acknowledging that the overall framework of the hyangga texts is Old Korean.

The hyangga could no longer be read by the Joseon period (1392–1910). The modern study of Old Korean poetry began with Japanese scholars during the Japanese colonial period (1910–1945), with Shinpei Ogura pioneering the first reconstructions of all twenty-five hyangga in 1929. The earliest reconstructions by a Korean scholar were made by Yang Chu-dong in 1942 and corrected many of Ogura's errors, for instance properly identifying 只 as a phonogram for *-k. The analyses of Kim Wan-jin in 1980 established many general principles of hyangga orthography. Interpretations of hyangga after the 1990s, such as those of Nam Pung-hyun in the 2010s, draw on new understandings of early Korean grammar provided by newly discovered Goryeo texts.

Nevertheless, many poems remain poorly understood, and their phonology is particularly unclear. Due to the opaqueness of data, it has been convention since the earliest Japanese researchers for scholars to transcribe their hyangga reconstructions using the Middle Korean lexicon, and some linguists continue to anachronistically project even non-lexical Middle Korean elements in their analyses.

=== Other textual sources ===
Old Korean glosses have been discovered on eighth-century editions of Chinese-language Buddhist works. Similar to the Japanese kanbun tradition, these glosses provide Old Korean noun case markers, inflectional suffixes, and phonograms that would have helped Korean learners read out the Classical Chinese text in their own language. Examples of these three uses of glossing found in a 740 edition of the Avatamsaka Sutra (now preserved in Tōdai-ji, Japan) are given below.

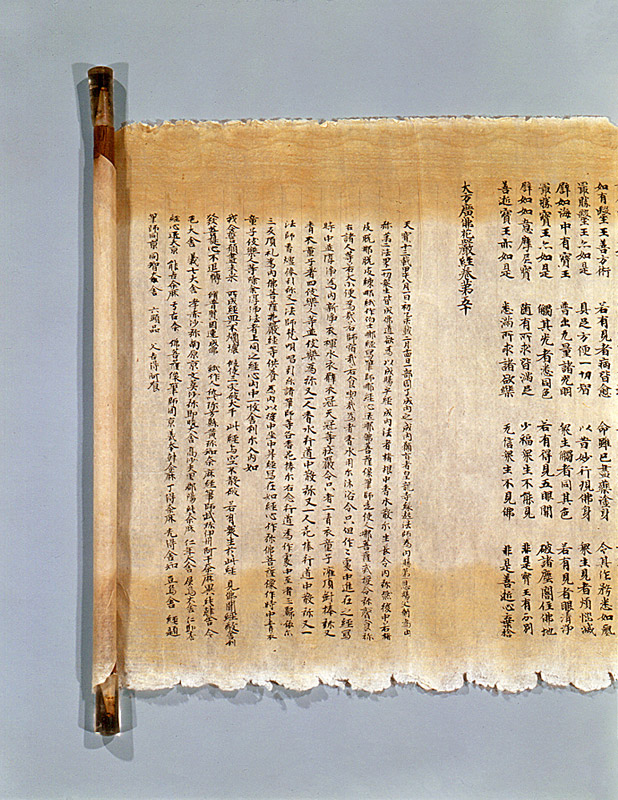
Scroll of a Silla edition of the Avatamsaka Sutra, written in 754–755

Classical Chinese original	尒時精進慧菩薩白法慧菩薩言
English gloss	that time Jingjinhui bodhisattva ask Fahui bodhisattva speech
Old Korean glossed text	尒時精**良**進慧菩薩白法慧菩薩言
English gloss	that time**-LOC** Jingjinhui bodhisattva ask Fahui bodhisattva speech
Translation	At that time, the Jingjinhui Bodhisattva asked the Fahui Bodhisattva...

Classical Chinese original	則爲不淨則爲可猒
English gloss	then be not clean then be can dislike
Old Korean glossed text	則爲不淨**厼**則爲可猒
English gloss	then be not clean**-CONN** then be can dislike
Translation	[That] it is an unclean thing and [that] it is a disliked thing...

Classical Chinese original	无邊種種境界
English gloss	not.exist edge kind kind border boundary
Old Korean glossed text	无邊種種**叱**境界
Purpose of gloss	Shows that 種種 is to be read as a native Korean word with final *-s (Note: cf. Middle Korean 갓갓 kaskas "many kind of")
Translation	The many kinds of endless boundaries...

Portions of a Silla census register with Old Korean elements, likely from 755 but possibly also 695, 815, or 875, have also been discovered at Tōdai-ji.

Though in Classical Chinese, the Korean histories Samguk sagi and Samguk yusa offer Old Korean etymologies for certain native terms. The reliability of these etymologies remains in dispute.

Non-Korean texts also provide information on Old Korean. A passage of the Book of Liang, a seventh-century Chinese history, transcribes seven Silla words: a term for "fortification", two terms for "village", and four clothing-related terms. Three of the clothing words have Middle Korean cognates, but the other four words remain "uninterpretable". The eighth-century Japanese history Nihon Shoki also preserves a single sentence in the Silla language, apparently some sort of oath, although its meaning can only be guessed from context.

=== Proper nouns ===
The Samguk sagi, the Samguk yusa, and Chinese and Japanese sources transcribe many proper nouns from Silla, including personal names, place names, and titles. These are often given in two variant forms: one that transcribes the Old Korean phonemes, using Chinese characters as phonograms, and one that translates the Old Korean morphemes, using Chinese characters as logograms. This is especially true for place names; they were standardized by royal decree in 757, but the sources preserve forms from both before and after this date. By comparing the two, linguists can infer the value of many Old Korean morphemes.

Period	Place name	Transliteration (Note: In Yale Romanization, the standard for Korean linguistics)	Gloss
Post-757	永同郡	Yengtwong County	long same county
Pre-757	吉同郡	Kiltwong County	auspicious same county
吉 is a phonogram for the Old Korean morpheme *kil- "long", represented after 757 by the logogram 永 and cognate to Middle Korean 길 kil- "id."
Post-757	密城郡	Milseng County	dense fortress county
Pre-757	推火郡	Chwuhwoa County	push fire county
推 is a logogram for the Old Korean morpheme *mil- "push", represented after 757 by the phonogram 密 mil and cognate to Middle Korean 밀 mil- "id."

=== Non-textual sources ===
The modern Korean language has its own pronunciations for Chinese characters, called Sino-Korean. Although some Sino-Korean forms reflect Old Chinese or Early Mandarin pronunciations, the majority of modern linguists believe that the dominant layer of Sino-Korean descends from the Middle Chinese prestige dialect of Chang'an during the Tang dynasty. (Note: Some scholars hold that the dominant layer comes from the somewhat earlier Middle Chinese of the Qieyun, or from the late Old Chinese of the Northern and Southern dynasties.)

As Sino-Korean originates in Old Korean speakers' perception of Middle Chinese phones, elements of Old Korean phonology may be inferred from a comparison of Sino-Korean with Middle Chinese. For instance, Middle Chinese, Middle Korean, and Modern Korean all have a phonemic distinction between the non-aspirated velar stop /k/ and its aspirated equivalent, /kʰ/. However, both are regularly reflected in Sino-Korean as /k/. This suggests that /kʰ/ was absent in Old Korean.

Old Korean phonology can also be examined via Old Korean loanwords in other languages, including Middle Mongol and especially Old Japanese.

== Orthography ==
All Old Korean was written with Sinographic systems, where Chinese characters are borrowed for both their semantic and phonetic values to represent the vernacular language. The earliest texts with Old Korean elements use only Classical Chinese words, reordered to fit Korean syntax, and do not represent native morphemes directly. Eventually, Korean scribes developed four strategies to write their language with Chinese characters:

- Directly adapted logograms (DALs or eumdokja 音讀字), used for all morphemes loaned from Classical Chinese and perceived as such. A character adapted as a DAL retains both the semantic and phonetic values of the original Chinese.
- Semantically adapted logograms (SALs or hundokja 訓讀字), where native Korean morphemes, including loanwords perceived as native words, are written with Chinese semantic equivalents. A character adapted as a SAL retains only the semantic value of the original Chinese.
- Phonetically adapted phonograms (PAPs or eumgaja 音假字), where native Korean morphemes, typically grammatical or semi-grammatical elements, are written with Chinese phonological equivalents. A character adapted as a PAP retains only the phonetic value of the original Chinese.
- Semantically adapted phonograms (SAPs or hungaja 訓假字), where native Korean morphemes are written with a Chinese character whose Korean semantic equivalent is phonologically similar to the morpheme. A SAP retains neither the semantic nor the phonetic value of the Chinese.

It is often difficult to discern which of the transcription methods a certain character in a given text is using. For example, Nam 2019 gives the following interpretation of the final line of the hyangga poem Anmin-ga (756):

Original script	國	惡	太	平	恨	音	叱	如
Meaning of characters	country	evil	great	peace	regret	sound	scold	like
Modern Sino-Korean reading	kwuk	ak	thay	phyeng	han	um	cil	ye
Korean word with same meaning	nala							ta
Phonetic adaptation		a			ho	m	s	ta
Reconstructed text	nala		thayphyeng-ho-ms-ta
Gloss	country		great.peace-do-ESSEN-DEC
Translation	'The country will deservedly be greatly peaceful.'

The text of this line uses all four strategies:

- The Sino-Korean words thay and phyeng are written with the corresponding Chinese characters (DAL).
- The native Korean word nala is written with a Chinese character having the same meaning (SAL).
- The Korean affixes -ho-ms are spelled out using characters whose Sino-Korean reading contain those sounds (PAP).
- The Korean verb ending ta is written with a Chinese character having the same meaning as *ta 'like', which is not attested but is presumably an ancestor of LMK tapta 'to be like' (SAP).

In Old Korean, most content morphemes are written with SALs, while PAPs are used for functional suffixes. In Korean scholarship, this practice is called hunju eumjong (Korean: 훈주음종; Hanja: 訓主音從), literally "logogram is principal, phonograms follow". In the eighth-century poem Heonhwa-ga given below, for instance, the inflected verb 獻乎理音如 give-INTENT-PROSP-ESSEN-DEC begins with the SAL 獻 "to give" and is followed by three PAPs and a final SAP that mark mood, aspect, and essentiality. Hunju eumjong is a defining characteristic of Silla orthography and appears not to be found in Baekje mokgan.

Another tendency of Old Korean writing is called mareum cheomgi (Korean: 말음첨기; Hanja: 末音添記), literally "final sounds transcribed in addition". A phonogram is used to mark the final syllable or coda consonant of a Korean word already represented by a logogram. Handel uses an analogy to "-st" in English 1st for "first". Because the final phonogram can represent a single consonant, Old Korean writing has alphabetic properties. Examples of mareum cheomgi are given below.

English	Old Korean	Logogram	Phonogram	Value of consonant phonogram	Modern Sino-Korean reading	Middle Korean cognate
Night	夜音 (Mojukjirang-ga)	夜	音	*-m	야음 ya um	밤 pam
Road	道尸 (Mojukjirang-ga)	道	尸	*-l	도시 two si	길 kil
Fortress	城叱 (Hyeseong-ga)	城	叱	*-s	성질 seng cil	잣 cas
Thousand	千隱 (Docheonsugwaneum-ga)	千	隱	*-n	천은 chen un	즈믄 cumun
Only	唯只 (Ujeok-ga)	唯	只	*-k	유지 ywu ci	오직 wocik
Sixty (Chinese loan)	六十𢀳 (Haman Seongsan Sanseong Mokgan No. 221)	六十	𢀳	*-p	육십읍 ywuk sip up	륙십 lywuksip
Stream	川理 (Chan'giparang-ga)	川	理	syllabic	천리 chen li	나리 nali
Rock	岩乎 (Heonhwa-ga)	岩	乎	syllabic	암호 am hwo	바회 pahwoy

Unlike modern Sino-Korean, most of which descends from Middle Chinese, Old Korean phonograms were based on the Old Chinese pronunciation of characters. For instance, characters with Middle Chinese initial *j were used to transcribe an Old Korean liquid, reflecting the fact that initial *j arose from Old Chinese *l. The characters 所 and 朔 had the same vowel in Old Korean orthography, which was true in Old Chinese where both had *a, but not in Middle Chinese, where the former had the diphthong *ɨʌ and the latter *ʌ.

Partly because of this archaism, some of the most common Old Korean phonograms are only partially connected to the Middle Chinese or Sino-Korean phonetic value of the character. Ki-Moon Lee and S. Robert Ramsey cite six notable examples of these "problematic phonograms", given below.

"Problematic phonogram"	Old Korean	Modern Sino-Korean	Middle Chinese (Baxter's transcription)	Old Chinese (Baxter-Sagart 2014) (Note: In Baxter-Sagart's reconstruction, brackets refer to uncertain phonetic identity; for instance, coda [t] may actually have been /p/, both of which were reflected in Middle Chinese as /t/.)	Explanation
良	*a~e	lyang	ljang	*[r]aŋ	May have been read as *la~le instead, although mokgan data supports *a. May also be a SAP.
旀	*mye	mye	mjie	*m-nə[r]	Lee and Ramsey consider this phonogram problematic because MC mjie had lost its diphthong by the eighth century, and so the Korean reading reflects "an especially old pronunciation".
遣	*kwo	kyen	khjienX	*[k]ʰe[n]ʔ	May have been read as *kye or *kyen instead, but evidence for *kwo is quite strong.
尸	*-l	si	syij	*l̥[ə]j	Preserves the Old Chinese lateral-initial pronunciation.
叱	*-s	cil	N/A	N/A	"Probably" preserves an older reading of 叱 with initial *s-. Alternately, may be a Korean creation independent of the Chinese glyph 叱, perhaps a simplification of 時 (MdSK si). May also be due to influence from Chinese Buddhist transcription systems for Sanskrit.
只	*ki / *-k	ci	N/A	N/A	May preserve an Old Chinese pronunciation that included velars.

Silla scribes also developed their own characters not found in China. These could be both logograms and phonograms, as seen in the examples below.

Silla-developed character	Use	Origin
太	Logogram for "bean" (Note: Unrelated to the Chinese character 太 identical in appearance and meaning "great")	Compound ideogram of 大 "big" and 豆 "bean"
椋	Logogram for "grain storehouse" (Note: Unrelated to the Chinese character 椋 identical in appearance and meaning "dogwood")	Compound ideogram of 木 "wood" and 京 "capital"
丨	Phonogram for *ta (Note: Unrelated to the very rare Chinese character 丨 meaning "to pierce")	Graphic simplification of 如, SAP for *ta
𢀳	Phonogram for *-p	Graphic simplification of 邑, PAP for *-p

Korean Sinographic writing is traditionally classified into three major systems: idu, gugyeol, and hyangchal. The first, idu, was used primarily for translation. In its completed form after the Old Korean period, it involved reordering Classical Chinese text into Korean syntax and adding Korean functional morphemes as necessary, with the result that "a highly Sinicized formal form of written Korean" was produced. The gugyeol system was created to aid the comprehension of Classical Chinese texts by providing Korean glosses. It is divided into pre-thirteenth century interpretive gugyeol, where the glosses provide enough information to read the Chinese text in the Korean vernacular, and later consecutive gugyeol, which is insufficient for a full translation. Finally, hyangchal refers to the system used to write purely Old Korean texts without a Classical Chinese reference. However, Ki-Moon Lee and S. Robert Ramsey note that in the Old Korean period, idu and hyangchal were "different in intent" but involved the "same transcription strategies". Suh Jong-hak's 2011 review of the Korean scholarship also suggests that most modern Korean linguists consider the three to involve the "same concepts" and the main differences between them to be purpose rather than any structural difference.

== Phonology ==
The phonological system of Old Korean cannot be established "with any certainty", and its study relies largely on tracing back elements of Middle Korean (MK) phonology.

=== Prosody ===
Fifteenth-century Middle Korean was a tonal or pitch-accent language whose orthography distinguished between three tones: high, rising, and low. The rising tone is analyzed as a low tone followed by a high tone within a bimoraic syllable.

Middle Chinese was also a tonal language, with four tones: level, rising, departing, and entering. The tones of fifteenth-century Sino-Korean partially correspond to Middle Chinese ones. Chinese syllables with level tone have low tone in Middle Korean; those with rising or departing tones, rising tone; and those with entering tone, high tone. These correspondences suggest that Old Korean had some form of suprasegmentals consistent with those of Middle Chinese, perhaps a tonal system similar to that of Middle Korean. Phonetic glosses in Silla Buddhist texts show that as early as the eighth century, Sino-Korean involved three tonal categories and failed to distinguish rising and departing tones.

On the other hand, linguists such as Ki-Moon Lee and S. Roberts Ramsey argue that Old Korean originally had a simpler prosody than Middle Korean, and that influence from Chinese tones was among the reasons for Korean tonogenesis. The hypothesis that Old Korean originally lacked phonemic tone is supported by the fact that most Middle Korean nouns conform to a tonal pattern, the tendency for ancient Korean scribes to transcribe Old Korean proper nouns with Chinese level-tone characters, and the accent marks on Korean proper nouns given by the Japanese history Nihon Shoki, which suggest that ancient Koreans distinguished only the entering tone among the four Chinese tones.

=== Syllable structure ===
Middle Korean had a complex syllable structure that allowed clusters of up to three consonants in initial and two consonants in terminal position, as well as vowel triphthongs. But many syllables with complex structures arose from the merger of multiple syllables, as seen below.

Attestation and source language	English	Pre-Middle Korean form	Reconstruction	Fifteenth-century form
Hyangga texts	old times	舊理	*niäri	녜 nyey
Hyangga texts	body	身萬	*muma	몸 mwom
Korean transcription of Early Middle Korean	arbor monkshood	五得浮得	*wotwokputuk	오독ᄠᅩ기 wotwokptwoki
Song transcription of Early Middle Korean	earth	轄希	*holki	ᄒᆞᆰ holk
Song transcription of Early Middle Korean	day	捻宰	*nacay	낮 nac
Japanese and Korean transcription of Baekje	front	アリヒシ	*arIpIsI	앒 alph
Japanese and Korean transcription of Baekje	stone	珍惡	*tərak	돓 twolh
Japanese and Korean transcription of Baekje	belt	シトロ	*sItOrO	ᄯᅴ stuy

Middle Korean closed syllables with bimoraic "rising tone" reflect an originally bisyllabic CVCV form in which the final vowel was reduced, and some linguists propose that Old Korean or its precursor originally had a CV syllable structure like that of Japanese, with all clusters and coda consonants forming due to vowel reduction later on. However, there is strong evidence for the existence of coda consonants in even the earliest attestations of Korean, especially in mareum cheomgi orthography.

On the other hand, Middle Korean consonant clusters are believed not to have existed in Old Korean and to have formed after the twelfth century with the loss of intervening vowels. Old Korean thus had a simpler syllable structure than Middle Korean.

=== Consonants ===
The consonant inventory of fifteenth-century Middle Korean is given here to help readers understand the following sections on Old Korean consonants. These are not the consonants of Old Korean, but of its fifteenth-century descendant.

Middle Korean consonant phonemes
		Bilabial	Alveolar		Velar	Glottal
Nasal		m ㅁ	n ㄴ		ŋ ㆁ	
Stop and affricate (Note: The consonant clusters /sk/, /sp/, and /st/ also had allophonic values [k͈], [p͈], and [t͈].)	plain	p ㅂ	t ㄷ	ts ㅈ	k ㄱ	
Stop and affricate	aspirated	pʰ ㅍ	tʰ ㅌ	tsʰ ㅊ	kʰ ㅋ	
Voiced fricative		β ㅸ	z ㅿ		ɣ ㅇ	
Voiceless fricative	plain		s ㅅ			h ㅎ
Voiceless fricative	reinforced		s͈ ㅆ			h͈ ㆅ (Note: /h͈/ only occurred in a single verb root, hhye- "to pull".)
Liquid			l~ɾ ㄹ			

Three of the nineteen Middle Korean consonants could not occur in word-initial position: /ŋ/, /β/, and /ɣ/. Only nine consonants were permitted in the syllable coda. Aspiration was lost in coda position; coda /ts/ merged with /s/; and /β/, /ɣ/, /h/, and the reinforced consonants could not occur as the coda. Coda /z/ was preserved only word-internally and when followed by another voiced fricative; otherwise it merged with /s/.

==== Nasals ====
Sino-Korean evidence suggests that there were no major differences between Old Korean and Middle Korean nasals.

Middle Chinese onset *ŋ is reflected in Sino-Korean as a null initial, while both Chinese and Korean transcriptions of Old Korean terms systematically avoid characters with onset *ŋ. Middle Korean phonotactic restrictions on /ŋ/ thus seem to have held true for Old Korean as well.

The Samguk Sagi sometimes alternates between nasal-initial and liquid-initial characters in transcribing the same syllable of the same proper noun. This suggests that Old Korean may have had a sandhi rule in which nasals could become liquids, or vice versa, under certain circumstances.

==== Aspirate consonants ====
The Middle Korean series of aspirated stops and affricates developed from mergers of consonant clusters involving /h/ or a velar obstruent, which in turn had formed from the loss of intervening vowels. To what extent this process had occurred in the Old Korean period is still debated.

Middle Chinese had a phonemic distinction between aspirated and unaspirated stops. This is reflected somewhat irregularly in Sino-Korean.

Korean reflexes of Chinese aspiration
Middle Chinese phoneme	Middle Sino-Korean reflex	Frequency of reflexes	Percentage
*kʰ	/k/	164	88.6%
*kʰ	/kʰ/	1	0.5%
*kʰ	Other	20	10.8%
*pʰ	/pʰ/	34	52.3%
*pʰ	/p/	31	47.7%
*tʰ	/tʰ/	70	73.6%
*tʰ	/t/	25	26.4%
*tsʰ	/tsʰ/	81	76.4%
*tsʰ	/ts/	23	21.7%
*tsʰ	Other	2	1.9%

Based on this variable reflection of Middle Chinese aspirates, Korean is thought to have developed the dental aspirates *tsʰ and *tʰ first, followed by *pʰ and finally *kʰ. *kʰ is often believed to have been absent when Sino-Korean was established.

Silla scribes used the aspirate-initial characters only infrequently. When they did, the aspirates were often replaced with unaspirated equivalents. For instance, the 757 standardization of place names sometimes involved changing aspirated phonograms for unaspirated ones, or vice versa. This suggests that aspiration of any sort may have been absent in Old Korean, or that aspirate stops may have existed in free variation with unaspirated ones but were not distinct phonemes. On the other hand, Ki-Moon Lee and S. Roberts Ramsey argue that Silla orthography confirms the existence in Old Korean of at least the dental aspirates as phonemes.

Meanwhile, Nam Pung-hyun believes that Old Korean had *kʰ and *tsʰ but may have lacked *pʰ and *tʰ, while noting that the functional load of the aspirates was "extremely low".

==== Origin of MK /h/ ====
Some characters with initial *k in Middle Chinese are reflected in Sino-Korean as /h/. Conversely, some instances of the Middle Chinese initial *ɣ~*ɦ, usually loaned as Sino-Korean /h/, are found as Sino-Korean /k/. This may be because Koreans mistakenly assigned the same initial consonant to characters which do share a phonetic radical but in practice had different Middle Chinese initials. On the other hand, this may reflect a velar value for the Old Korean ancestor of Middle Korean /h/. Korean scholars often propose an Old Korean velar fricative *x as ancestral to Middle Korean /h/.

Some orthographic alternations suggest that Silla writers did not distinguish between Middle Chinese initial *k and initial *ɣ~*ɦ, although linguist Marc Miyake is skeptical of the evidence, while some Middle Korean allomorphs alternate between /h/ and a velar. Linguist Wei Guofeng suggests that the Old Korean phonemes *k and *h had overlapping distributions, with allophones such as *x being shared by both phonemes. Alexander Vovin also argues via internal reconstruction that intervocalic *k in earlier Korean lenited to Middle Korean /h/.

==== Sibilants ====
In some pre-Unified Silla transcriptions of Korean proper nouns, Chinese affricate and fricative sibilants appear interchangeable. This has been interpreted as some stage of Old Korean having lacked the Middle Korean distinction between /ts/ and /s/. The hyangga poems, however, differentiate affricates and fricatives consistently, while the Chinese distinction between the two is faithfully preserved in Sino-Korean phonology. Koreans thus clearly distinguished /ts/ from /s/ by the eighth century, and Marc Miyake casts doubt on the notion that Korean ever had a stage where affricates and fricatives were not distinct.

==== Liquids ====
Middle Korean had only one liquid phoneme, which varied between [l] and [ɾ]. Old Korean, however, had two separate liquid phonemes. In Old Korean orthography, this first liquid phoneme was represented by the PAP 尸, whose Old Chinese value was *l̥[ə]j, and the second phoneme by the PAP 乙, whose Old Chinese value was *qrət. Besides this orthographic variation, the distinction between the liquid phonemes is also suggested by the tonal behavior of Middle Korean verb stems ending in /l/.

According to Alexander Vovin, Ki-Moon Lee asserts that 尸 represented /r/ and that 乙 represented /l/. Vovin considers this claim "unacceptable" and "counterintuitive", especially given the reconstructed Old Chinese pronunciations of both characters, and suggests instead that 尸 represented /l/ while 乙 stood for a rhotic. Ramsey and Nam Pung-hyun both agree with Vovin's hypothesis.

== Grammar ==
The case markers in Old Korean are the following:

Nominative case	伊/是 (-i)
Genitive case	衣/矣 (-ʌj), 叱 (-s)
Accusative case	乙 (-(u)r)
Dative case	中, 良中 (-aj/-ej, -hʌj/-ahʌj in Idu script)
Instrumental case	留 (-ro ~ -ʌro)
Comitative case	果 (-wa/-ɡwa)
Vocative case	良, 也 (-a, -ja), 下 (-ha)

Other affixes are:

Topic marker	隱 (-n ~ -nʌn ~ -ʌn)
Additive	置 (-do)
Honorific	賜 (-si-)
Humble	白 (-sʌv-)

The pronunciations written in parentheses are from Middle Korean (中世國語, 중세국어). The letter ʌ is used to represent the pronunciation of "ㆍ" (arae-a), which is obsolete in Modern Korean.

== Vocabulary ==
=== Numerals ===
Three Old Korean numerals are attested in the hyangga texts: those for one, two, and thousand. All three are found in the Docheonsugwaneum-ga, while the word for one is also attested identically in the Jemangmae-ga. The Cheoyong-ga uses a somewhat different form for "two", though it is unlikely to be authentically Silla. The mokgan data, discussed in Lee Seungjae 2017, suggests that multiples of ten may have been referred to with Chinese loanwords but that indigenous terms were used for single-digit numbers. Lee's work on mokgan yields Silla words for four of the latter: one, three, four, and five. The orthography of Old Korean numerals, in both hyangga and the mokgan texts, is marked by the hunju eumjong principle typical of Silla.

The Old Korean single-digit numerals are given with fifteenth-century and Modern Korean equivalents below. The Modern Korean terms used to refer to the ages of cattle, which Lee Seungjae considers more closely related to Old Korean forms, are also provided.

English	Old Korean	Reconstruction		Middle Korean (15th c.)	Modern Korean	Modern Korean for ages of cattle
One	一等 (hyangga data)	*hədən		ᄒᆞ낳 honah	하나 hana	하릅 halup
One	(坐)伽第𢀳 (mokgan data)	*gadəp		ᄒᆞ낳 honah	하나 hana	하릅 halup
Two	二尸 (Docheonsugwaneum-ga)	*tubər	*twuɣul	둟 twulh	둘 twul	이듭 itup
Two	二肹 (Cheoyong-ga)	*tubər	*twuɣur	둟 twulh	둘 twul	이듭 itup
Three	三[missing character]	*sadəp		셓 seyh	셋 seys	사릅 salup
Four	四刂	*neri		넿 neyh	넷 neys	나릅 nalup
Five	丨彡	*tasəm		다ᄉᆞᆺ tasos	다섯 tases	다습 tasup
Five	丨沙[missing character]	*tasap		다ᄉᆞᆺ tasos	다섯 tases	다습 tasup

== Relationship to other languages ==
Numerous attempts have been made to connect Old Korean and Koreanic languages (and by extension Middle Korean and Modern Korean) with other language families, but no genetic relationship with any other language family has ever been clearly demonstrated.

In the past, some linguists suggested that Old Korean could be a member of the theoretical Altaic language family, but the Altaic language grouping itself has been largely discredited (particularly regarding supposed shared features of languages in this group such as agglutination and SOV word order, which are common to the majority of languages around the world and not just those in the theorized Altaic group, and thus cannot be considered typological features) and is not accepted as valid by linguists today. Another hypothesis suggests that Old Korean is related to the Japonic languages, but this hypothesis is also not widely accepted. (Note: Ramsey writes that "the genetic relationship between Korean and Japanese, if it in fact exists, is probably more complex and distant than we can imagine on the basis of our present state of knowledge.")

== Sample text ==
The Heonhwa-ga is a four-line hyangga from the early eighth century, preserved in the Samguk yusa. The Samguk yusa narrative recounts that Lady Suro, the beautiful wife of a local magistrate, once came upon a cliff a thousand zhang high topped by azalea blooms. Lady Suro asked if any of her entourage would pick her some of the azaleas, but none were willing. Upon hearing her words, however, an old man who had been leading a cow beside the cliff presented the flowers to her while singing the Heonhwa-ga. Nam Pung-hyun considers the song "of relatively easy interpretation" due to its short length, the context provided, and its consistent hunju eumjong orthography.

This article's reconstruction of the Heonhwa-ga follows the work of Nam 2010, partly translated into English by Nicolas Tranter in Nam 2012b. Nam's decipherment reproduces the grammar of Old Korean, but with Middle Korean values for Old Korean morphemes. Elements in bold are phonograms. (Note: The romanization given is in a variant of Yale romanization, the standard system of Korean linguistics, but with <o> and <ó> instead of conventional <wo> and <o> for Middle Korean vowels /o/ and /ʌ/.)

Heonhwa-ga
Old Korean original

紫**布**岩**乎**邊**希**

執**音乎**手母牛放**敎遣**

吾**肸**不**喩**慚**肸伊賜等**

花**肸**折**叱可**獻**乎理音如**

Modern Sino-Korean reading

ca **pho** am **ho** pyen **huy**

cip **um ho** su mo wu pang **kyo kyen**

o **hil** pwul **ywu** cham **hil i sa tung**

hoa **hil** cel **cil ka** hen **ho li um ye**

Reconstruction (Nam 2010)

ᄃᆞᆯ뵈 바희 ᄀᆞᆺᄋᆡ

잡ᄋᆞᆷ 혼 손 암쇼 놓이시고

나ᄅᆞᆯ 안디 븟그리ᄉᆞᆫ ᄃᆞᆫ

곶ᄋᆞᆯ 것거 받오리ᇝ다

Heonhwa-ga Analysis
Romanization

tól**poy** pah**uy** kós-**óy**

cap-**óm** [ho]-**n** son amsyo noh-**kisi-ko**

na-**lól** an**ti** pusk**uli-só-n tó-n**

koc-**ól** ke**sk-e** pat-**o-li-ms-ta**

Interlinear gloss

purple rock edge-LOC

hold-DUR [do]-NMR hand cow-ACC let.go-HON-CONJ

I-ACC NEG be.ashamed-HON-NMR fact-TOP

flower-ACC pick-INF give-INTENT-PROSP-ESSEN-DEC

Translation (Nam 2012b)

Beside the purple rock [of azaleas]

You made me let loose the cows [because of your beauty]

And if you do not feel ashamed of me

I shall pick a flower and give it to you. (Note: In Nam 2010's analysis, the Modern Korean translation of the Heonhwa-ga is given as "진달래꽃(또는 철쭉꽃)이 흐드러지게 피어 붉게 뒤덮은 바위 가에 / (부인의 아름다움이 나로 하여금) 잡고 있던 손이 암소를 놓게 하시고 / 나를 안 부끄러워 하시는 것, 바로 그것이라면 / 꽃을 꺾어 반드시 바치겠습니다." A more literal translation than Nam 2012 of the Korean is "At the edge of the rock where azaleas have bloomed splendidly and mantled with red / [The lady's beauty] makes the hand that was holding let loose the cow / Not being ashamed of me, if indeed it is such / I will pick a flower and present it without fail.")
