= Tripitaka Koreana =

13th-century Korean Buddhist scriptures

Coordinates: 35°48′6″N 128°5′55″E

Tripiṭaka Koreana
- Haeinsa, South Korea
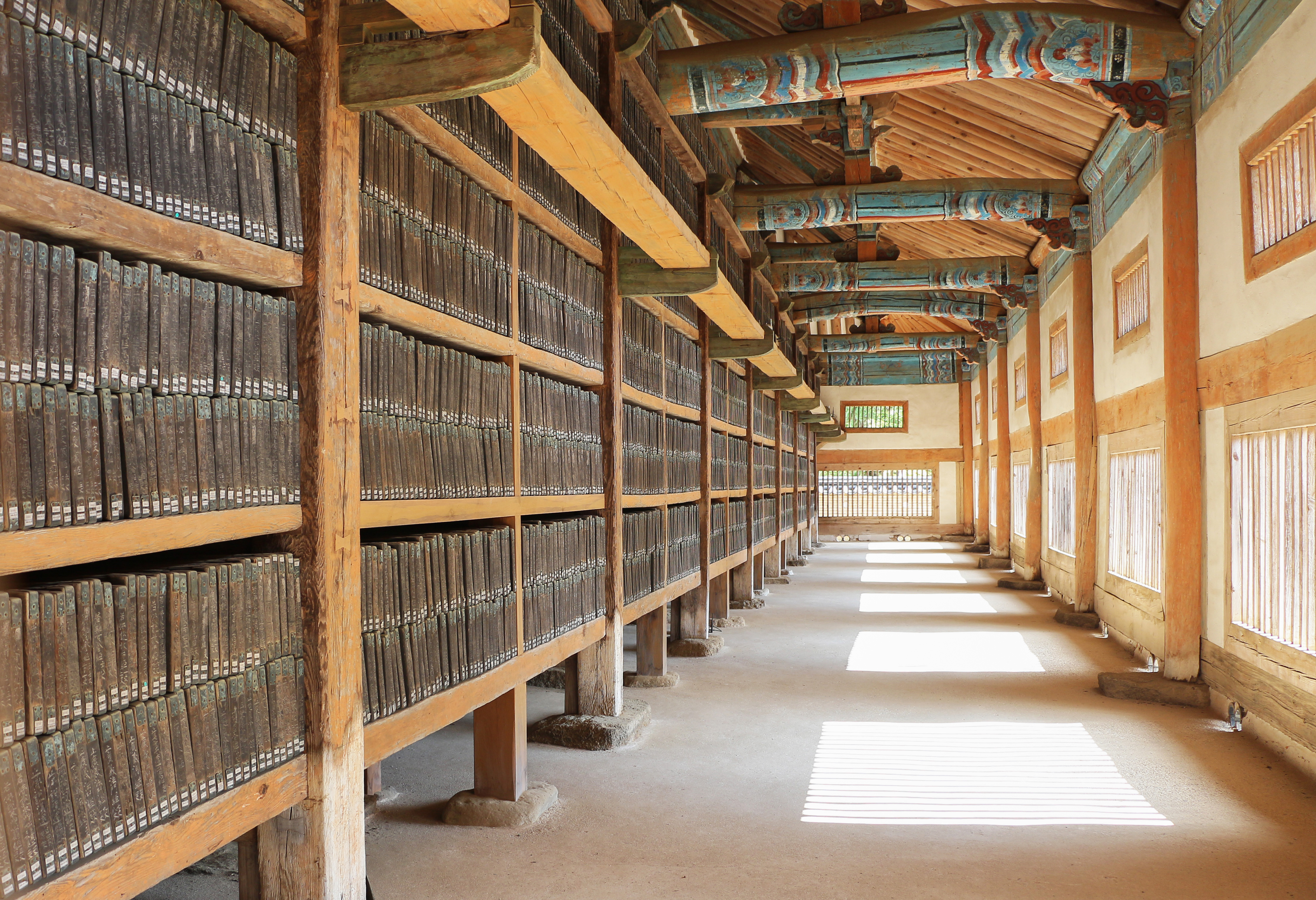
- The Tripiṭaka Koreana in storage at Haeinsa (2022)
- Type: Woodblocks for printing
- Language: Classical Chinese
- Material: Birch wood
- Size: 1,496 texts; 6,568 books
- Contents: Buddhist canon

National Treasure (South Korea)
- Official name: Printing Woodblocks of the Tripitaka Koreana in Haeinsa Temple, Hapcheon
- Designated: 20 December 1962
- Reference no.: 32

Korean name
- Hangul: 팔만 대장경; 고려 대장경
- Hanja: 八萬大藏經; 高麗大藏經
- RR: Palman daejanggyeong; Goryeo daejanggyeong
- MR: P'alman taejanggyŏng; Koryŏ taejanggyŏng

The Tripiṭaka Koreana (naming controversial, see below) refers to a Korean collection of Tripiṭaka scriptures carved onto 81,352 wooden printing blocks in the 13th century of the Goryeo period (hence also: The Goryeo Tripiṭaka (Note: Korean: 고려대장경; RR: Goryeo Daejanggyeong)). They are currently located at the Buddhist temple Haeinsa, in South Gyeongsang Province, South Korea. It is the oldest intact version of the Chinese Buddhist canon, the shared canonical collection of East Asian Buddhism written in Buddhist Chinese. It contains 1,496 titles divided into 6,568 books, spanning 81,258 pages, for a total 52,330,152 characters. It is often called the Palman Daejanggyeong ("Eighty-thousand Tripitaka") (Note: Korean: 팔만 대장경, alternate name: 합천 해인사 대장경판; lit. 'Hapcheon Haeansa Tripiṭaka') due to the number of the printing plates that comprise it.

Each wood block (page) measures 24 centimetres in height and 70 centimetres (9.4 in × 27.6 in) in length. The thickness of the blocks ranges from 2.6 to 4 centimetres (1.0–1.6 in) and each weighs about three to four kilograms (6.61 - 8.81 lbs). The woodblocks would be almost as tall as Paektu Mountain at 2.74 km (1.70 mi) if stacked and would measure 60 km (37 mi) long if lined up, and weigh 280 tons in total. The woodblocks are in pristine condition without warping or deformation despite being created more than 750 years ago.

The Tripiṭaka was designated a National Treasure of South Korea in 1962, and inscribed in the UNESCO Memory of the World international register in 2007. Historically, the Tripiṭaka was closed except for Buddhist events and scholars; it was finally opened to members of the public who preregister in advance in 2021.

== Naming ==
In 2013 Robert Buswell Jr., a scholar of Korean Buddhism, called for the English name Tripiṭaka Koreana to be changed to Korean Buddhist Canon, indicating that the current nomenclature is misleading because the Tripiṭaka Koreana is much greater in scale than the actual Tripiṭaka, and includes much additional content such as travelogues, Sanskrit and Chinese dictionaries, and biographies of monks and nuns.

== History ==
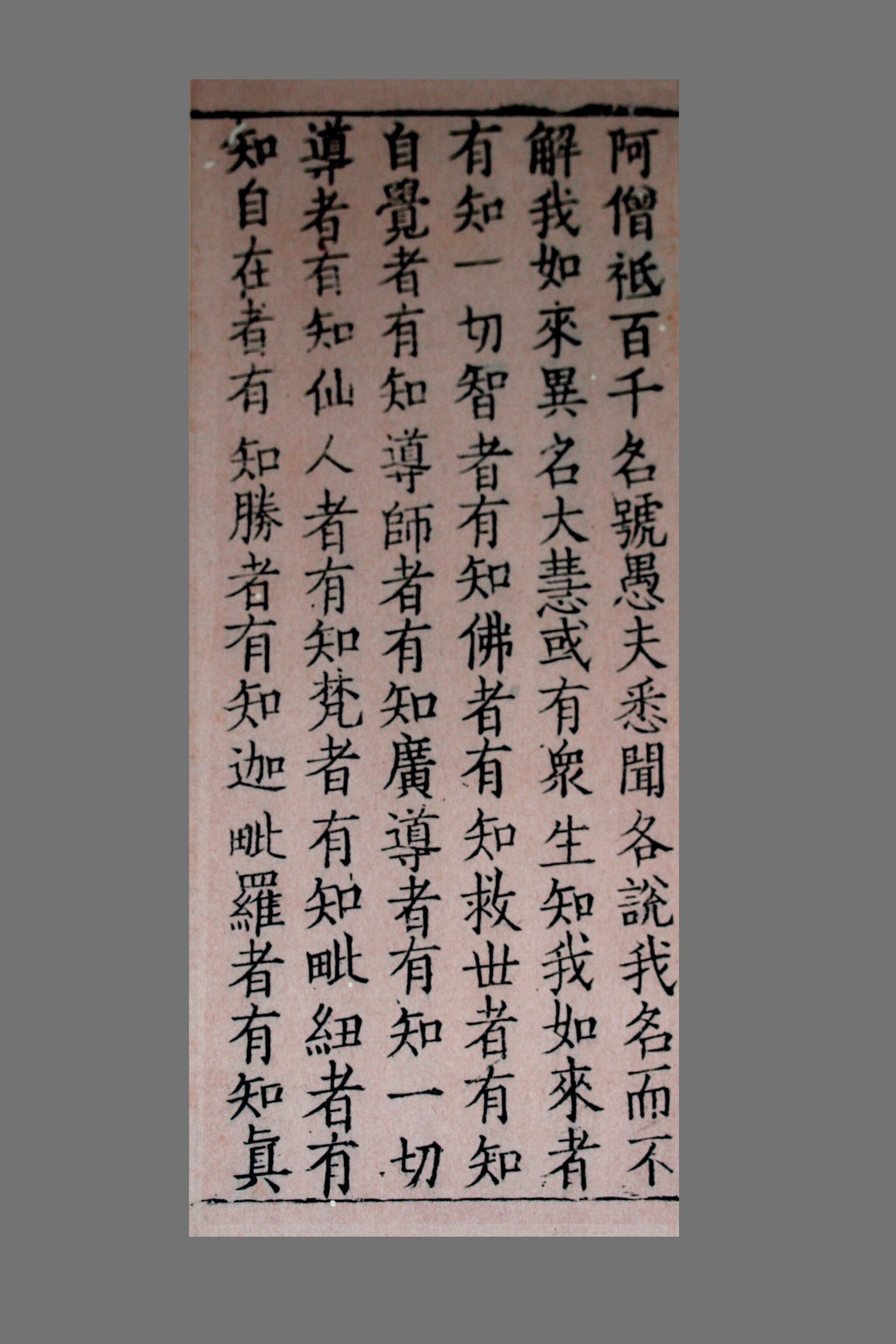
Tripiṭaka Koreana sutra page in 1371

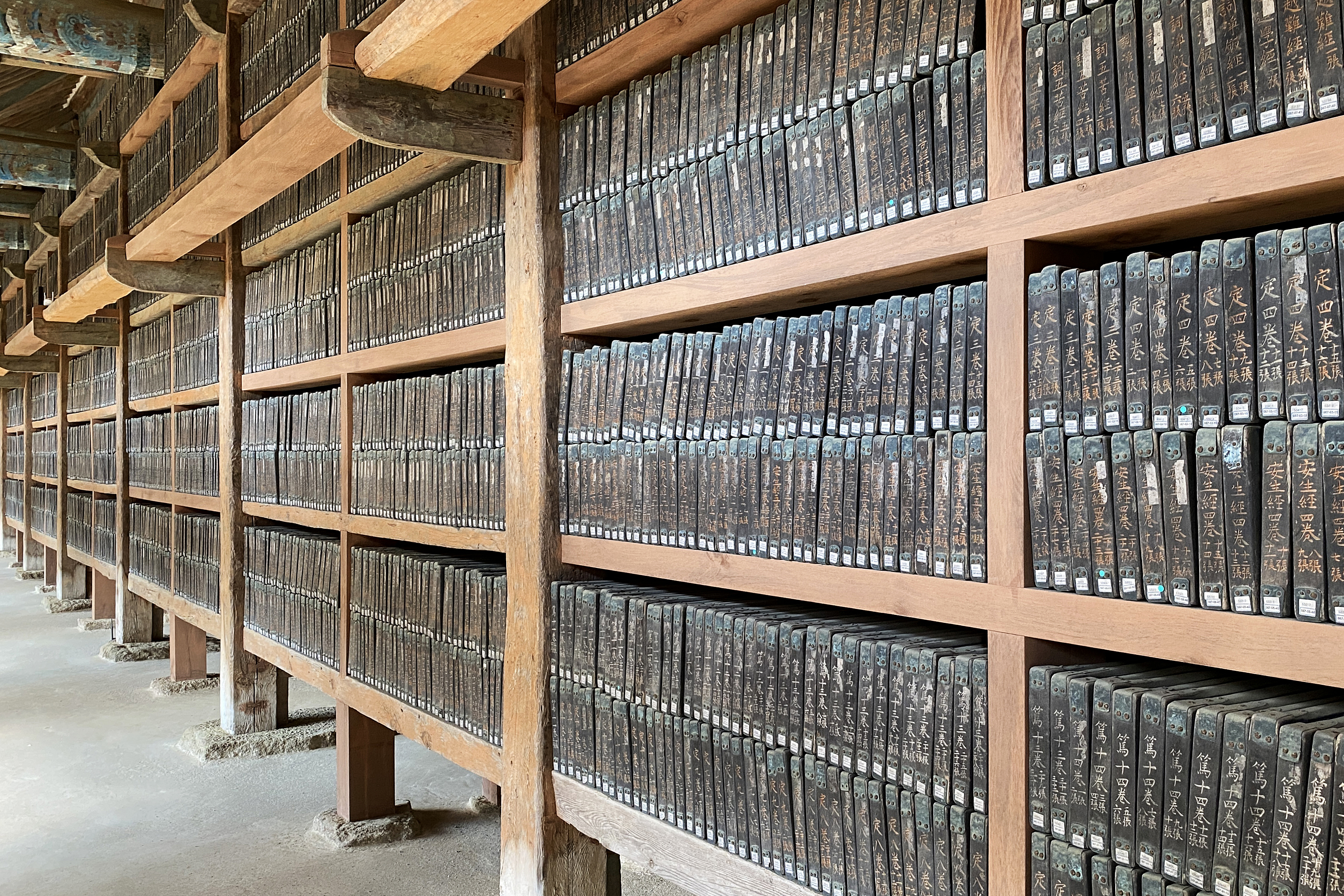
Tripitaka storage

Work on the first Tripiṭaka Koreana began in 1011 during the Goryeo–Khitan War and was completed in 1087. Choi's Goryeo Military Regime, which moved the capital to Ganghwa Island due to Mongol invasions, set up a temporary organization called "Daejang Dogam".

The act of carving the woodblocks was considered to be a way of bringing about a change in fortune by invoking the Buddha's help. The first Tripiṭaka Koreana was based primarily on the Kaibao Canon completed in the 10th century, but other scriptures published until then, such as the Khitan Tripiṭaka, were also consulted in order to identify items in need of revision and adjustment. The first Tripiṭaka Koreana contained around 6,000 volumes.

The original set of woodblocks was destroyed by fire during the Mongol invasions of Korea in 1232, when Goryeo's capital was moved to Ganghwa Island during nearly three decades of Mongol incursions, although scattered parts of its prints still remain. To once again implore divine assistance with combating the Mongol threat, King Gojong thereafter ordered the revision and re-creation of the Tripiṭaka; the carving began in 1237 and was completed in 12 years, with support from Ch'oe U and his son Ch'oe Hang, and involving monks from both the Seon and Gyo schools. This second version is usually what is meant by the Tripiṭaka Koreana. In 1398, it was moved to Haeinsa, where it has remained housed in four buildings.

The production of the Tripiṭaka Koreana was an enormous national commitment of money and manpower, according to Robert Buswell Jr., perhaps comparable to the US 1960s Apollo program Moon landings. Thousands of scholars and craftsmen were employed in this massive project.

== Evaluation and significance ==
The Tripiṭaka Koreana is the 32nd National Treasure of South Korea, and Haeinsa, the depository for the Tripiṭaka Koreana, has been designated as a UNESCO World Heritage Site. The UNESCO committee describes the Tripiṭaka Koreana as "one of the most important and most complete corpus of Buddhist doctrinal texts in the world". Not only is the work invaluable, it is also aesthetically valuable and shows a high quality of workmanship. Currently, the Palman Daejanggyeong is one of the three woodblocks in the world that are registered on UNESCO.

The Tripiṭaka Koreana is stored in Haeinsa temple. While most of the wood blocks have remained in pristine condition for more than 750 years, a few were damaged when a new depository was built in the early 1970s (by the Park Chung Hee regime) and few blocks were transplanted to the new building on a trial basis. Those blocks were damaged almost immediately. They were subsequently moved back to their initial spots and the new building was shut down. That building is now the 'Zen Center'. Currently there are ongoing debates as to the quality of the current storage area.

The historical value of the Tripiṭaka Koreana comes in part from the fact it is comprehensive: it is used as a compilation of the Chinese Buddhist Canon. It is a popular misconception that the Tripitaka Koreana does not contain a single error; a survey found that the text does indeed have missing characters and errors. The compilers of the Korean version incorporated older Northern Song Chinese, Khitan, and Goryeo versions, and added content written by respected Korean monks. Contemporary scholars are able to conduct research about the older Chinese and Khitan versions of the Tripiṭaka using the Korean version. The quality of the wood blocks is attributed to the National Preceptor Sugi, the Buddhist monk in charge of the project, who carefully checked the Korean version for errors. Upon completing the Tripiṭaka Koreana, Sugi published 30 volumes of Additional Records which recorded errors, redundancies, and omissions he found during his comparisons of the different versions of the Tripiṭaka. Because of the relative completion of the Korea edition of the Chinese Buddhist Tripitaka, the Japanese Taisho edition of the Tripiṭaka was said also to have been based on the Korean edition. Some of the Tripiṭaka Koreana's texts were even used in the Chinese edition of Zhonghua dazangjing which was based on the Jin edition which in turn was a sister edition sent to Korea.

The Tripiṭaka Koreana was one of the most coveted items among Japanese Buddhists in the Edo period. Japan never managed to create a woodblock Tripiṭaka, and made constant requests and attempts to acquire the Tripiṭaka Koreana from Korea since 1388. 45 complete printings of the Tripiṭaka Koreana were gifted to Japan since the Muromachi period. The Tripiṭaka Koreana was used as the basis for the modern Japanese Taishō Tripiṭaka.

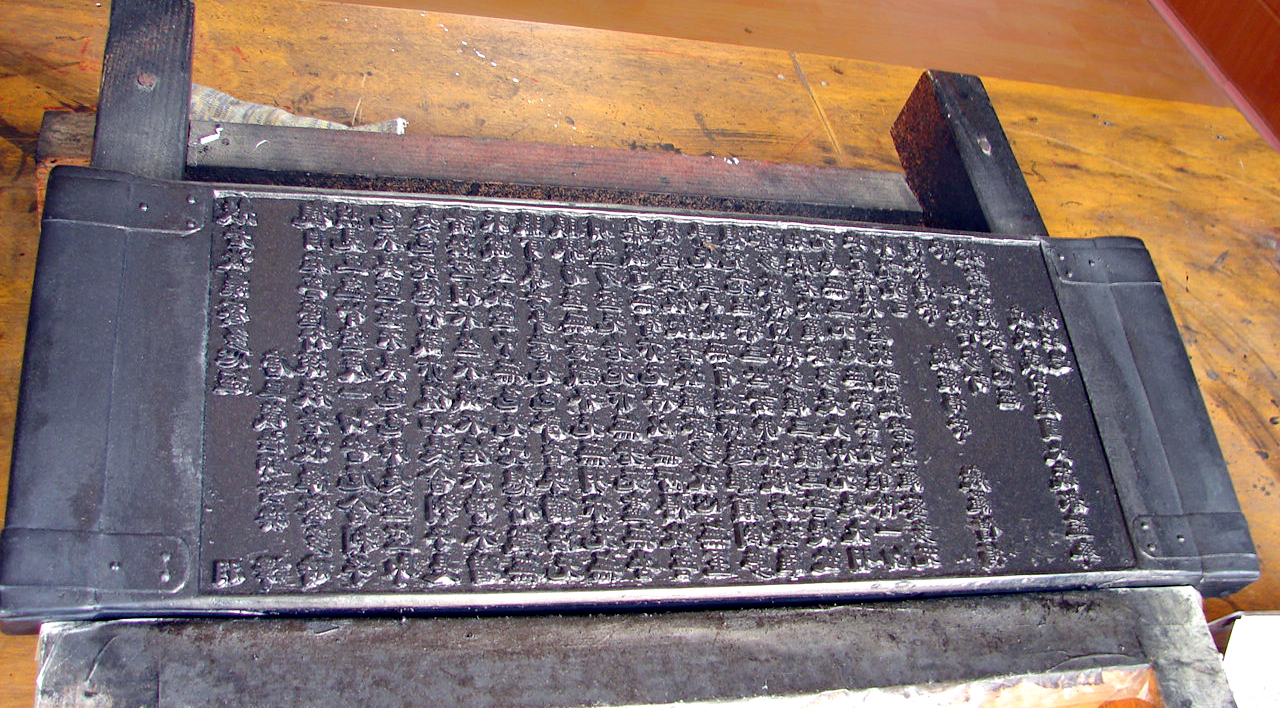
Copy of a Tripiṭaka Koreana woodblock at Haeinsa complex grounds used to allow visitors to make an inked print of the Heart Sutra while at the temple. See: for image of woodblock print.

Each block was made of birch wood from the southern islands of Korea and treated to prevent the decay of the wood. The blocks were soaked in sea water for three years, then cut and boiled in salt water. Next, the blocks were placed in the shade and exposed to the wind for three years, at which point they were ready to be carved. After each block was carved, it was coated in a poisonous lacquer to keep insects away and then framed with metal to prevent warping.

Every block was inscribed with 23 lines of text with 14 characters per line. Therefore, each block, counting both sides, contained a total of 644 characters. The consistency of the style - and some external sources - led people to believe that a single man carved the entire collection, but it is now estimated that a team of 30 men carved the Tripiṭaka.

== Digitization ==
As of 2024, the Cultural Heritage Administration expects to have digitization files publicly available by 2027.

== Modern edition ==
The modern edition has 1514 texts in 47 volumes.

Volume	Text	Author or compiler	Chinese title	Korean title	Period
32	1064	Huiyuan (慧苑)	新譯大方廣佛華嚴經音義 xin1 yi4 da4 fang1 guang3 fo2 hua1 yan2 jing1 yin1 yi4	Shin Yeok Dae Bang Gwang Bul Hwa Eom Gyeong Eum Ui	
34	1257	Ke Hong (可洪)	新集藏經音義隨函錄 xin1 ji2 zang4 jing1 yin1 yi4 sui2		Later Jin
35	1258	Emperor Taizong (太宗)	御製蓮華心輪回文偈頌 yu4 zhi4 lian2 hua1 xin1 lun2 hui2 wen2 ji4 song4		Northern Song (北宋, 976–997)
35	1259	Emperor Taizong (太宗)	御製秘藏詮 yu4 zhi4 mi4 zang4 quan2		Northern Song (北宋, 976–997)
35	1260	Emperor Taizong (太宗)	御製逍遙詠 yu4 zhi4 xiao1 yao2 yong3		Northern Song (北宋, 976–997)
35	1261	Emperor Taizong (太宗)	御製緣識 yu4 zhi4 yuan2 shi4		Northern Song (北宋, 976–997)
38	1402	Sugi (守其)	高麗國新雕大藏校正別錄 gao1 li4 guo2 xin1 diao1 da4 zang4 jiao4 zheng4 bie2 lu4)		1251 CE or 38 Anno Gojong (高宗) Coreae (高麗)
39	1405		大藏目錄 Da4 zang4 mu4 lu4		
45	1500	Yŏn Sŏnsa (連禪師), appendix by Chŏn Kwangjae (全光宰) in Jinan (晉安), Gyeongsang Province (慶尚道)	南明泉和尚頌證道歌事實 nan2 ming2 quan2 he2 shang4 song4 zheng4 dao4 ge1 shi4 shi2		compiled during Gojong period (1214–1259), appendiced on 9th month of 35 AGC (1248 CE)
45	1503	Qingxiu with disciples Ching (靜) and Yun (筠)	祖堂集 zu3 tang2 ji2		in 10th year of Emperor Li Jing (保大) of Tang (952)
45	1504	Chen Shi	大藏一覽集 da4 zang4 yi1 lan3 ji2		Ming
46	1505	Hyesim	禪門拈頌集 chan2 men2 nian1 song4 ji2		13 AGC (1226 CE)
47	1507	Kyunyŏ (均如)	十句章圓通記 shi2 ju4 zhang1 yuan2 tong1 ji4		(found by Cheon-gi 天其 in Gap Temple (岬寺) spring of 1226)
47	1508	Kyunyŏ (均如)	釋華嚴旨歸章圓通鈔 shi4 hua1 yan2 zhi3 gui1 zhang1 yuan2 tong1 chao1	Sŏk hwa ŏm ji kwi jang wŏn t'ong ch'o	
47	1509	Kyunyŏ (均如)	華嚴經三寶章圓通記 hua1 yan2 jing1 san1 bao3 zhang1 yuan2 tong1 ji4	Hwa ŏm gyŏng sam bo jang wŏn t'ong gi,	
47	1510a	Kyunyŏ (均如)	釋華嚴旨歸章圓通鈔 shi4 hua1 yan2 jing1 jiao4 fen1 ji4 yuan2 tong1 chao1	Sŏk hwa ŏm gyo pun gi wŏn t'ong ch'o	
47	1510b	Hyŏngnyŏn Chŏng (赫連挺)	大華嚴首座圓通兩重大師均如傳幷序		1st month of 29 Anno Munjong Coreae (1075 CE)
47	1511	Wang Tzu-ch'eng of Yuan (1280–1368) with foreword by Yi Sunbo (李純甫)	禮念彌陀道場懺法 Li3 nian4 mi2 tuo2 dao4 chang3 chan4 fa3		2 Anno Kangjong Coreae (1213 CE)
47	1514		高麗大藏經補遺目錄gao1 li4 da4 zang4 jing1 bu3 yi2 mu4 lu4	Ko-ryŏ taejanggyŏng poyu mongnok	

== See also ==
- Woodblock printing in Korea
- Early Buddhist Texts
- Pali Canon
- Taishō Tripiṭaka
- Jingo-ji Tripiṭaka
- Tripiṭaka tablets at Kuthodaw Pagoda
- Gandhāran Buddhist texts
- Buddhist texts
- Buddhism in Korea
- National treasures of South Korea

== Cited works ==
- Keown, Damien; Prebish, Charles S., eds. (2010). Encyclopedia of Buddhism. New York: Routledge. ISBN 978-0-203-49875-0.
- Turnbull, Stephen (2003). Genghis Khan & the Mongol Conquests 1190–1400. Oxford: Osprey Publishing. ISBN 1-84176-523-6.
