= Hyangga =

Early Korean poetry

- Hangul: 향가
- Hanja: 鄕歌
- RR: hyangga
- MR: hyangga

Hyangga (Korean: 향가; Hanja: 鄕歌) were poems written using Chinese characters in a system known as hyangchal during the Unified Silla and early Goryeo periods of Korean history. Only a few have survived: 14 in the Samguk yusa (late 6th to 9th centuries) and 11 by the monk Kyunyeo (10th century).

== Features ==
Written using Hanja in a system known as hyangchal the hyangga are believed to have been first written in the Goryeo period, as the style was already beginning to fade. A collection of hyangga known as the Samdaemok (삼대목; 三代目) was compiled in the late 9th century by Wihong, the prime minister of Queen Jinseong of Silla, and the monk Taegu-Hwasang, but was since lost. The surviving hyangga consist of 14 recorded in the Samguk Yusa and 11 in the Gyunyeojeon by Kyunyeo.

The name hyangga is formed from the character for "back-country" or "rural village" (鄕) – which was often used by the Silla people to describe their nation, specifically to distinguish these distinctly Silla poems from "pure" Chinese literature – and the character for "song" (歌). These poems are accordingly sometimes known as "Silla songs."

Eighteen of the 25 surviving hyangga reflect Buddhist themes. Another dominant theme was death. Many of the poems are eulogies to monks, to warriors, and to family members — in one case, a sister. The Silla period, especially before unification in 668, was a time of warfare; the hyangga capture the sorrow of mourning for the dead while Buddhism provided answers about where the dead go and the afterlife.

== Structure ==
The structure of hyangga is not completely understood. The only contemporaneous reference is a comment by Hyŏngnyŏn Chŏng, the compiler of Gyunyeo's biography that "their poetry is written in Chinese in penta- and heptasyllabic lines, [while] our songs are written in the vernacular in three gu and six myeong". What is meant by "three gu and six myeong" remains unresolved; Peter H. Lee interprets it as "three-line stanzas of six phrases each", while Alexander Vovin translates it more literally as "three stanzas, six names".

Since the work of linguist Shinpei Ogura in the 1920s, surviving hyangga have traditionally been classified into one of three forms: a single-quatrain form used in folk songs; an intermediate two-quatrain form; and a ten-line form of two quatrains and a concluding couplet, the most fully developed form of hyangga. This classification has been questioned in Korean scholarship since the 1980s, and a new hypothesis, proposed by Kim Sung-kyu in 2016, suggests that there were really only two forms of hyangga: a single-quatrain form and a two-tercet form. Kim interprets two consecutive lines of the ten-line form as one long line with a caesura, and the so-called "concluding" couplet of the ten-line hyangga to be a refrain for each of the stanzas, thus forming two tercets with shared final lines. Kim further argues that apparently eight-line forms are the result of a line being lost during transmission.

The two hypotheses are illustrated below with the ten-line work Jemangmaega, written for the funeral of the poet's sister.

Jemangmae-ga-10

(1)

(2)

(3)

(4)

(5)

(6)

(7)

(8)

(9)

(10)

Ten-line reading

生死路隱

此矣有阿米次肹伊遣

吾隱去內如辭叱都

毛如云遣去內尼叱古

於內秋察早隱風未

此矣彼矣浮良落尸葉如

一等隱枝良出古

去奴隱處毛冬乎丁

阿也 彌陀刹良逢乎吾

道修良待是古如

Translation
The path of life and death

Were [you] so afraid when it was here

(4) That [you] went and could not say

(3) Even the words, "I'm going"?

(6) Like leaves that float and fall hither-thither

(5) By unripe autumn's early winds,

Stemming from one branch

Knowing not where [we] go.

(10) Ah, [you] will clear the road and wait

(9) For me, to meet in the pure land.

Jemangmae-ga-6

(1)

(2)

(3)

(4)

(5)

(6)

Six-line reading

生死路隱此矣有阿米次肹伊遣

吾隱去內如辭叱都毛如云遣去內尼叱古

阿也彌陀刹良逢乎吾道修良待是古如

於內秋察早隱風未此矣彼矣浮良落尸葉如

一等隱枝良出古去奴隱處毛冬乎丁

阿也彌陀刹良逢乎吾道修良待是古如

Translation
Were [you] so afraid when the path of life and death was here

That [you] went and could not say even the words, "I'm going"?

Ah, [you] will clear the road and wait for me, to meet in the pure land.

Like leaves that float and fall hither-thither by unripe autumn's early winds,

Stemming from one branch, knowing not where [we] go.

Ah, [you] will clear the road and wait for me, to meet in the pure land.

== Example ==
A typical hyangga is "The Ode for Life Eternal" (or, perhaps, "The Ode for Nirvana"), a song that calls upon the Moon to convey the supplicant's prayer to the Western paradise, the home of Amita (or Amitabha, the Buddha of the Western Pure Land Sukhavati). The poem's authorship is somewhat unclear; it was either written by a monk named Gwangdeok (광덕; 廣德) or, one source says, the monk's wife.

Idu	Middle Korean	Modern Korean	Translation
願往生歌	원와ᇰᄉᆡᇰ가	왕생을 기원하는 노래	Ode to Eternal Life (translation by Mark Peterson, 2006)
月下伊低赤	ᄃᆞᆯ하 이뎨	달이여 이제	Oh Moon!
西方念丁去賜里遣	셔바ᇰᄭᆞ자ᇰ 가샤리고	서방(西方) 넘어 가시려는고	As you go to the west this night,
無量壽佛前乃	무랴ᇰ슈불 젼에	무량수불전(無量壽佛前)에	I pray thee, go before the eternal Buddha,
惱叱古音多可支白遣賜立	닏곰다가 ᄉᆞᆲ고샤셔	일러서 사뢰옵소서	And tell him that there is one here
誓音深史隱尊衣希仰支	다딤 기프샨 존어ᄒᆡ 울워러	다짐 깊으신 아미타불을 우러러	Who adores Him of the deep oaths,
兩手集刀花乎白良	두 손 모도호ᄉᆞᆯᄫᅡ	두 손을 모두어	And chants daily with hands together, saying
願往生願往生	원와ᇰᄉᆡᇰ 원와ᇰᄉᆡᇰ	왕생(往生)을 원하며	Oh grant me eternal life,
慕人有如白遣賜立	그릴 사ᄅᆞᆷ 잇다 ᄉᆞᆲ고샤셔	그리워하는 사람 있다 사뢰소서	Oh grant me eternal life,
阿耶 此身遣也置古	아으 이 몸 기텨 두고	아아 이 몸을 남겨 놓고	But alas, can any of the 48 vows be kept
四十八大願成遣賜去	ᄉᆞ십팔대원 일고샬가	사십 팔 대원(大願) 이루실까	While still trapped in this mortal frame?

== List ==
Hyangga in the Samguk yusa
Title	English	Author	Date	Graphs	Lines	Location	Text
Hyeseong ga	Song of a Comet	Master Yungcheon	594	83	10	2:228	혜성가
Seodong yo	Song of Seodong	King Mu of Baekje	c. 600	25	4	2:98	서동요
Pung yo	Ode to Yangji	anonymous	c. 635	26	4	4:187–188	풍요
Won wangsaeng ga	Prayer to Amitāyus / Ode for Life Eternal	Gwangdeok or his wife	c. 661–681	77	10	5:220	원왕생가
Mo Jukjilang ga	Ode to Knight Jukji	Deugo	c. 692–702	60	8	2:76–78	모죽지랑가
Heonhwa ga	Dedication of the Flower	an old herdsman	c. 702–737	34	4	2:79	헌화가
Won ga	Regret	Sinchung	737	56	8	5:232–233	원가
Chan Gipalang ga	Ode to Knight Gipa	Master Chungdam	c. 742–765	71	10	2:80–81	찬기파랑가
Dosol ga	Song of Tuṣita Heaven	Master Weolmyeong	760	37	4	5:222	도솔가
Je mangmae ga	Requiem for the Dead Sister	Master Weolmyeong	c. 762–765	75	10	2:79–80	제망매가
Do Cheonsu Gwaneum ga (Note: Also called Cheonsudaebiga (천수대비가; 千手大悲歌).)	Hymn to the Thousand-Eyed Sound Observer	Huimyeong (Note: A woman who lived in Hangi-ri, Gyeongju. The woman composed the hyangga while praying to Cheonsugwaneum, a Guanyin with a thousand hands and eyes, at Bunhwangsa temple on behalf of her blind five-year old son; it is said that, as a result of this endeavour, her son eventually regained his sight.)	c. 762–765	81	10	3:158–159	도천수관음가
Anmin ga	Statesmanship	Master Chungdam	765	98	10	2:79–80	안민가
Ujeog ga	Meeting with Bandits	Master Yeonghae	c. 785–798	75	10	5:235	우적가
Cheoyong ga	Song of Cheoyong	Cheoyong	879	61	8	2:88–89	처용가

The 11 hyangga composed by Kyunyeo (923–973) are:

1. Yekyeong Jebul ga [Veneration of Buddhas] 예경제불가
2. Chingchan Yorae ga [In Praise of Tathagata/Buddha] 칭찬여래가
3. Gwangsu Gongyang ga [Abundant Offerings to Buddha] 광수공양가
4. Chamhoe Opjang ga [Repentance of Sins and Retribution] 참회업장가
5. Suhui Kongdeok ga [Rejoice in the Rewards of Virtue] 수희공덕가
6. Cheongjeon Beopyun ga [The Revolving Wheel of Law] 청전법륜가
7. Cheongbul Juse ga [Entreaty to the Coming of Buddha] 청불왕생가
8. Sangsun Bulhak ga [Faithful Observance of Buddha's Teachings] 상수불학가
9. Hangsun Jungsaeng ga [Constant Harmony with Other Beings] 항순중생가
10. Bogae Hoehyang ga [Salvation of All Living Beings] 보현회향가
11. Chonggyeol Mujin ga [The Everlasting Conclusion] 총결무진가

== See also ==
- Sijo
- Gasa (poetry)
- Korean literature
