= Yang Ju-dong =

South Korean writer (1903–1977)

- Born: 24 June 1903; Kaesong, Gyeonggi Province, Korean Empire
- Died: 4 February 1977 (aged 73)
- Resting place: Yongin Memorial Park, Yongin, South Korea
- Education: Waseda University
- Occupations: Professor, Literary Scholar
- Writing career
- Language: Korean

Korean name
- Hangul: 양주동
- Hanja: 梁柱東
- RR: Yang Judong
- MR: Yang Chudong

Art name
- Hangul: 무애
- Hanja: 无涯
- RR: Muae
- MR: Muae

Yang Ju-dong (Korean: 양주동; 24 June 1903 – 4 February 1977) was a South Korean poet, professor, literary scholar, and academic. He published on both English and Korean literature. He is also known by his art name Mu-ae (무애).

== Life ==
=== Personal life ===
Yang was born on June 24, 1903, in Gaeseong, Gyeonggi-do as the only son in the family. They moved to Jangyeon, Hwanghae-do a year after his birth. However, Yang's father died soon when Yang was only six, and he also lost his mother when he was twelve. "Mother's Love [어머니 마음]," a song of national fame in Korea, is a poem written by Yang in 1939 to commemorate the early death of his mother. In 1920, he went to Seoul to receive advanced education at Joongdong School, and in 1921, he enrolled in Waseda University in Tokyo, Japan, where he received a BA in English literature. Upon graduating, Yang was hired as a professor at Pyongyang Soongsil School (숭실전문학교; 崇實專門學校) but had to leave when it closed during the Japanese colonial period. He worked as a teacher at Kyungsin School (경신학교; 儆新學校) from 1940 until 1945. After Korea's emancipation in 1945, Yang became a professor at Dongguk University in 1947. In 1958, he went to Yonsei University and taught there for three years. He returned to teach at Dongguk University in 1962 until he left education in 1973. He was awarded an honorary doctorate of literature by Yonsei University in 1957.

=== Career ===
In his early days, Yang focused on delivering the Western literature to Korea. In 1923, he issued the journal Geum-Seong (금성) with Yoo Yeop (유엽), Baek Giman (백기만), and Lee Janghui(이장희) and introduced the literary movements from other countries. Some exemplary poets presented in Geum-Seong include French Symbolists Charles Baudelaire, Paul Verlaine, and Arthur Rimbaud. Geumseong also published a number of original poems by Korean poets, which aided in the development of modern poetry in 1920s' Korea. Yang's research interest during this period was on forming the theoretical basis for national literature. In the turbulence of dispute between nationalism and proletarianism, Yang asserted for moving beyond the dichotomy of the two prevalent literary perspectives. This eclectic perspective first emerges in his article "The Attitude of a Literary Critic " (문예비평가의 태도 기타), and evolves into a structural perspective in "Regarding the Attitude of Literary Critics Once More (다시 문예비평의 태도에 취하야)." Yang's turned his eyes to traditional Korean literature in the 1930s. In 1932, Yang published a collection of his poems called Joseon's Pulse (조선의 맥박). This collection contains 53 poems divided into three sections, including the titular work, "Joseon's Pulse". He published interpretations of Hyangga (향가; a genre of old Korean folk songs) and Korean classical poetry. His most noted work is his publication of "Interpretation of Hyanggas: On 'Wonwangsaengga' (향가의 해독, 특히 '원왕생가'에 취하여)," which was the first translation and analysis of all 25 Hyanggas conducted by a Korean scholar. This interpretation is the archetype of later research works on Hyanggas.

== Works ==
=== Debate on Translation Methods ===
Yang was in the center of critical discourse about translation in the 1920s. In the journal Geumseong, he debated Kim Uk (김억) about effective translation methods for foreign literature. Several years later, he debated about similar issues with the Society for Research in Foreign Literature. These debates influenced the development of translations off foreign texts by academic scholars and writers.

The debate with Kim Uk began when Kim criticized Yang's literal translations in Geumseoung. Kim claimed that they were mere transference of words. Yang, in response to this, argued that the idea of creative liberty in translations evoked the danger of distorting the original meaning of the text. Yang's criticisms display that he regarded the major function of translation to be an accurate mediator between the author and the readers. Although exact deliverance of the original text into another language was an impracticable feat, he believed that the role of a translator was to work toward such goal in pursuit of introducing foreign texts to the new audience. Kim interpreted translation from a different approach. Kim believed in reaching the ideal state of translation by regarding the translated work as another independent text. To Kim, the crux of translators work lay in achieving the state of art more than the deliverance of the text.

Another critical debate that influenced Korean academic discourse was Yang's criticism of the journal Foreign Literature (해외문학) that was published in 1927 by members of the Society for Research in Foreign Literature (외국문학연구회). Foreign Literature's creators aimed to procure foreign texts and thereby expand Korea's literary landscape. Yang agreed with the journal's purpose, but he heavily criticized the journal's method of translation. Yang listed three requirements for translations in this criticism. The first was that the translated language must be domesticated in the target language. The second was that the translations should eschew the use of Hanja. The last was to refrain from the hasty import of foreign lexicons. In contrast to Yang, Lee Hayun (이하윤) and Kim Jinseop (김진섭), the representative members of the Society for Research in Foreign Literature, claimed that the use of foreign words was inevitable in perspicuous deliverance of the text. Yang's adherence to his position is interpreted as a desire to preserve the Korean language despite the influences of Japanese, Chinese, and European languages. These debates over translations are historically significant in two main ways: first, they marked progress toward setting the independent agenda for translations, and second, they cautioned against the dangers of arbitrary modifications on foreign works. Yang's critical debates reveal Korea's early interest in translations and are considered an epoch of the period that set the agenda for translations of equivocal texts.

=== Research on Hyanggas ===
Yang focused on the study of Korean classical poetry (고려가요) and Hyangga in his 30s and 40s. When the Japanese linguist Shinpei Ogura published A Study of Hyangga and Idu in 1929, Yang felt the need for a Korean to research this canonical text. In 1937, he published "Interpretation of Hyanggas: On 'Wonwangsaengga'" with criticisms towards Ogura's interpretations. Yang's main point in his criticisms was that Ogura dismissed the importance of meter and rhythm when interpreting Hyanggas.Yang believed that preserving the rhythmic element of the verses was crucial to delivering the poetic form of the original works. While "Interpretation" was highly regarded by the academic community as the first attempt by a Korean to analyze Korean heritage, it also received criticisms that Yang's research did not provide sufficient linguistic evidence in several parts. Nevertheless, his work was a dominant achievement in Korea's initial study on Hyanggas, and his exceptional use of poetic forms was seldom challenged by those in the field. His continued interest in Hyanggas resulted in the publication of Study on Joseon Classical Poetry (조선고가연구) (1942). After Korea's emancipation, Yang wrote Yeoyojeonju (여요전주) (1947), which was a fully annotated work on Goryeogayo (고려가요; old songs during the Goryeo period), and Study on Classical Poetry (고가연구) (1954), a revised version of Study on Joseon Classical Poetry.

== Criticism ==
=== A Representative of Eclecticism ===
Yang is a representative of the eclectic perspective between nationalism and proletarianism in 1920s Korea. The 1920s were a time of intense debate between those who held nationalist and proletarianist perspectives. With Korea subject to Japanese colonial rule, scholars of both perspectives deemed the main objective of literature to be a restoration of national authority, but they diverged in their views on how to achieve this goal. While nationalists opted for emphasis on the text itself, preferring works that reflected national spirit, proletarianists asserted that literature must inspire a political message. The proponents of proletarianism founded KAPF and actively criticized nationalist literature. Resolving the conflict between these two perspectives emerged as the major task of the age. Yang's works published in this era criticized the radicality of both sides and created a compromising perspective between the two. In 1927, Singanhoe was founded with the objective of discovering a way to develop and study literature in a manner that embraced both nationalist and proletarian values. Yang, who was a member of Singanhoe, claimed that to recover the nation's subjectivity, both perspectives had to be modified to tackle their deficiencies. This outlook can be observed in Yang's article "Pure and Mean, Joseon's Literature Goals " (철저와 중용—조선이 가지고 싶은 문학) in The Chosun Ilbo (1926.1.10–12), where he demonstrated that literature is formulated under the various conditions of a historical period and, therefore, cannot be separated from the political aspect of the environment. His idea that literature reflects historical problems and responsibilities criticized the nationalist scholars who underestimated the influence of the social elements. Yang asserted that the nationalist approach was an ideal that could only be reached after the turbulent age of Japanese colonialism. In this way, he proclaimed that nationalism called for a change that suited the needs of the nation. He also disapproved of the way proletarianism downplayed the importance of nationalist literature. Yang pointed out that texts with cultural significance were vital in restoring long-term independence and thus must not be neglected in favor of political texts. Today, Yang's perspective is viewed as instrumental in detecting and modifying the then-current ideologies' limitations to suit modern needs. However, Yang's approach is also often criticized for its insufficient provision of a specific blueprint to substitute for the two ideologies he criticized.

== Publications ==
=== Selected books ===
Joseon's Pulse (조선의 맥박, 1932)

Study on Joseon Classical Poetry (조선고가연구, 1942)

Yeoyojeonju (여요전주, 1947)

Study on Classical Poetry (고가연구, 1954)

Yeoyojeonju - A Sequel (여요전주—속편, 1954)

A Study on Korean Studies (국학연구논고, 1962)

A Revised Version of Study on Classical Poetry (증정 고가연구, 1965)
