= Shin'yaku Kegonkyō Ongi Shiki =

Japanese annotation of the Avatamsaka Sūtra

The Shin'yaku Kegonkyō Ongi Shiki (新訳華厳経音義私記) is a Japanese annotation of the Avatamsaka Sūtra. Dated to 794, it is the oldest Japanese ongi, or collection of difficult to interpret words showing their pronunciation and meaning, and is a National Treasure of Japan.

== Background ==
The text is two fascicles in length. The compiler is unknown but is presumed to have related to Tōdai-ji. It is an annotation of the 80-volume Avatamsaka Sūtra. As the original was written in Chinese, the annotation contains a list of words and expressions from the original and glosses them with Japanese readings and meanings. The orthography of the Japanese suggests that it is a late Nara period text. However, the manuscript contains a number of errors and is judged to be a copy of an earlier original. There is only one known existing manuscript.

== Linguistics ==
The text is viewed as a valuable reference for Old Japanese linguistics. The Japanese annotations are written in Man'yōgana and, with the exception of /to1, to2/, distinguishes between Jōdai Tokushu Kanazukai. It contains a total of 162 Japanese words, many of which are the oldest extant citations. In addition, it also contains the oldest example of a long vowel as well as a number of Japanese-specific Kan'yō-on readings of kanji.
