= Jemangmaega =

8th-century Korean poem

- Hangul: 제망매가
- Hanja: 祭亡妹歌
- RR: Jemangmaega
- MR: Chemangmaega

Jemangmaega (Korean: 제망매가; Hanja: 祭亡妹歌) is an 8th-century hyangga written by a Buddhist monk named “Wolmyeongsa” in the ancient Korean kingdom of Silla. The poem was included in Samguk Yusa, a collection of folklore from the Three Kingdoms period. The poem still remains one of the most popular Korean works of literature today.

The poem's title “Jemangmaega” roughly translates to “A Requiem for a Dead Sister.” Consequently, the poem is about the author mourning his sister's death in a regretful and sad tone. A variety of figurative expressions such as similes, metaphors, and philosophical statements related to death are present in the work.

== Legend ==
It is believed that the poem was written during the deceased sister's jesa, a traditional Korean funeral. Legend states that upon writing the poem on a piece of paper, a strong gust of wind flew the paper westwards. In Korean and Buddhist folklore, a paper flying towards the west means that the wish on the paper has been granted.

== Original text ==
生死路隠
此矣有阿米次肹伊遣
吾隐去内如辝叱都
毛如云遣去内尼叱古
於內秋察早隠風未
此矣彼矣浮良落尸葉如 / 一等隠枝良出古
去奴隠處毛冬乎丁
阿也
彌陁刹良逢乎吾 / 道修良待是古如

== Translation ==
Original (Hyangchal)	Mixed Script Korean	Modern Korean	English
生死路隠	生死 길흔	삶과 죽음의 길은	Was it because it was here that the paths of life and death crossed that you hesitated,
此矣有阿米次肹伊遣	이에 이샤매 머믓그리고	여기에 있음에 머뭇거리고	Was it because it was here that the paths of life and death crossed that you hesitated,
吾隐去内如辝叱都	나ᄂᆞᆫ 가ᄂᆞ다 말ᄯᅩ	'나는 간다'는 말도	and then passed away without even saying "I must go?"
毛如云遣去内尼叱古	몯다 니르고 가ᄂᆞ닛고	못 다 하고 가는가	and then passed away without even saying "I must go?"
於內秋察早隠風未	어느 ᄀᆞᅀᆞᆯ 이른 ᄇᆞᄅᆞ매	어느 가을 이른 바람에	Like leaves that will be blown hither and thither in an untimely autumn wind, though we come from the same branch,
此矣彼矣浮良落尸葉如 / 一等隠枝良出古	이ᅌᅦ 뎌ᅌᅦ ᄠᅳ러딜 닙ᄀᆞᆮ / ᄒᆞᄃᆞᆫ 가지라 나고	이리저리 떨어질 잎처럼 / 한 가지에 나고도	Like leaves that will be blown hither and thither in an untimely autumn wind, though we come from the same branch,
去奴隠處毛冬乎丁	가논 곧 모ᄃᆞ론뎌	가는 곳을 모르겠구나	we know not where we go.
阿也	아야	아아,	Oh! (Interjection)
彌陁刹良逢乎吾 / 道修良待是古如	彌陀刹아 맛보올 나 / 道 닷가 기드리고다	극락세계에서 만날 나 / 도를 닦아 기다리겠노라	As for me, whom you shall meet in Paradise, I shall wait, seeking truth profound.
