= Shinpei Ogura =

Japanese linguist (1882–1944)

- 小倉進平
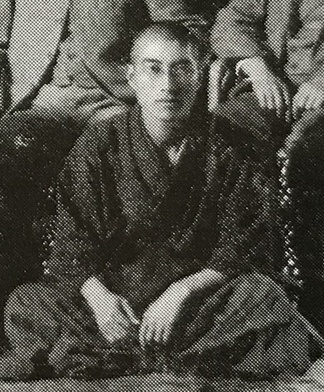
- Ogura as a graduate student at Tokyo Imperial University
- Born: June 4, 1882; Sendai, Empire of Japan
- Died: February 8, 1944 (aged 61); Tokyo, Empire of Japan
- Known for: decipherment of hyangga, survey of Korean dialects
- Awards: Imperial Prize of the Japan Academy

Academic background
- Education: Tokyo Imperial University

Academic work
- Discipline: Linguistics
- Sub-discipline: Korean language
- Institutions: Keijō Imperial University, Tokyo Imperial University

Shinpei Ogura (小倉進平, Ogura Shinpei; June 4, 1882 – February 8, 1944) was a Japanese linguist who studied the Korean language.

Ogura is well-known in Korea for his contributions to Korean linguistics, with much of his field work and studies considered invaluable resources even in recent years. Ogura made a number of landmark firsts in the field; he was the first person to decipher hyangga poetry documents. He is also considered the first modern researcher of Korean dialects, and traveled throughout the peninsula doing field research. The data he collected on dialects are still widely referred to, especially because the division of Korea in 1945 has made it difficult to study dialects on opposite ends of the peninsula.

In Korean, he is sometimes called Soch'ang Chinp'yŏng (Korean: 소창진평), the Korean Hanja reading of his name.

== Biography ==
Ogura was born in Sendai, Miyagi Prefecture, Empire of Japan into a family of scholars. After graduating from the Second Tertiary School (predecessor to the modern Tohoku University), he entered Tokyo Imperial University, where he majored in linguistics. He graduated in 1906, with a thesis on the phonology of Japanese during the Heian period. After graduating, he performed research under the guidance of notable Japanese linguist Ueda Kazutoshi. During this period, he planned to continue studying Japanese, but in 1911, ended up moving to Korea at the age of 29 to serve as an official under the Japanese Governor-General of Korea. He would end up spending 20 years on the peninsula.

=== Researching Korean ===
During this time, he held a number of academic and teaching positions, including at the Keijō Medical School (a predecessor to Seoul National University). He also taught Japanese to students and edited textbooks. By June 1919, his rank in the government was Vice-Chancellor. While working in the colonial government, Ogura contributed to the development of a Korean dictionary, which was eventually published in 1920.

==== Researching dialects ====
Ogura travelled the peninsula and performed extensive research on the various Korean dialects, making him the first modern researcher to do so. While his interest in dialects was initially more of a hobby (he even used his own vacation time to make these trips), he eventually devoted more attention in it, as he saw studying texts alone as insufficient for deciphering hyangga. He visited Jeju Island in 1912, Hwanghae Province in 1913, South Gyeongsang Province in 1915, North Gyeongsang Province in 1916, South Chungcheong and South Jeolla Province in 1918, South Hamgyong Province in 1920, North Jeolla and North Chungcheong Province in 1921, North Gyeongsang Province in 1922, and Gangwon Province in 1923.

Ogura conducted dialect surveys at 259 points throughout the peninsula. He began at each regional county office and branched out from there. For much of this work, he traveled on horseback, as there was a significant lack of infrastructure in rural areas. The colonial government actively supported his research; he was assigned a police officer for protection when he worked in Jeju. The result of this work was around 40 papers on Korean dialects.

==== Hyangga and idu ====
During this time, he also studied old Korean books and documents. This includes his now famous research on hyangga in the 1920s, which he eventually published in 1929. In 1927, he received a doctorate in literature, with his thesis on hyangga and idu. His work in this area inspired the Korean academic Yang Ju-dong to research hyangga as well.

=== Later career ===
From August 1924 to April 1926, he studied abroad in Europe as an overseas researcher and professor at an overseas branch of Keijō Imperial University. Following this, he returned to Korea and was made a professor of linguistics at Keijō. There, he trained a number of Korean linguists. He also opened the first university library in Korea in 1926. A significant number of the notable Korean linguists and librarians from around this period were his former students.

In 1933, he was appointed professor of linguistics at Tokyo Imperial University, although he visited Korea annually to lecture. During this time, he continued publishing on Korean dialects. In 1935, he received an Imperial Prize of the Japan Academy for his contributions to East Asian linguistics and his exploration of the relationship between the Korean and Japanese languages. In 1938, he served as the first vice president of the Linguistic Society of Japan.

He retired in 1943 due to poor health, although he continued his research on Korean. He died on February 8, 1944. At the time of his death, he had been in the final stages of preparing a book of his life's research. The book was subsequently posthumously published that May by one of his students, Shibata Takeshi (柴田武; 1918–2007). Many of the old books that he collected throughout his research are now held in the Ogura Collection at Tokyo University.

== Legacy ==
Amongst Korean linguists, Ogura is well-known but has a mixed legacy. While he made significant contributions to the study of Korean and was sympathetic to the plight of the peninsula under the Japanese Empire, he also considered the Korean culture and civilization to be inferior to those of Japan, and saw their subjugation as a natural outcome of that.

== Selected works ==
- Chōsengo gakushi 朝鮮語学史 [History of the Study of Korean]. Osaka: Tōkō Shoin. 1920. doi:10.11501/1870268. Revised edition, 1940: doi:10.11501/1869842.
- Kyōka oyobi rito no kenkyū 鄉歌及び吏讀の研究 [A study of hyangga and idu] (in Japanese). Seoul: Keijō Imperial University. 1929. doi:10.11501/1119562.
- "The outline of the Korean dialects". Memoirs of the Research Department of the Tōyō Bunko. 12: 1–143. 1940.
- Chōsengo hōgen no kenkyū 朝鮮語方言の研 [A Study of the Korean Dialects] (in Japanese). Tokyo: Iwanami Bunko. 1944. Volume 1: doi:10.11501/1869828. Volume 2: doi:10.11501/1869845.
