= Jinamitra =

Jinamitra was an Indian pandita who travelled to Samye in the Tibetan Empire to engage in translation, at the time of Trisong Detsen, in the eighth century CE. Jinamitra worked with Jñānagarbha and Devacandra to translate the Mahāyāna Mahāparinirvāṇa Sūtra and was a famous lotsawa (translator). He is also known for his translation of the Avatamsaka Sutra from Sanskrit to Tibetan.
