= Hyŏngnyŏn Chŏng =

Goryeo scholar-bureaucrat (fl. 11th–12th c.)

- Hangul: 혁련정
- Hanja: 赫連挺
- RR: Hyeongnyeon Jeong
- MR: Hyŏngnyŏn Chŏng

Hyŏngnyŏn Chŏng (Korean: 혁련정; Hanja: 赫連挺) was a Goryeo scholar and court official who is known for writing the Kyunyŏ-jŏn, a biography on the Goryeo monk Kyunyŏ.

== Biography ==
Due to Hyŏngnyŏn Chŏng's non-Korean family name, Hyŏngnyŏn, it is thought that his ancestors were originally nomads, originating from either China or from the Khitans, who later naturalized as Koreans. The Hyŏngnyŏn family name traced back to the Xiongnu family name Helian, first adopted by Helian Bobo, the founder of Helian Xia.

Sometime prior to 1075, Hyŏngnyŏn Chŏng passed the civil service examination and held the title of chinsa. In 1074, after being dissatisfied with an earlier biography on Kyunyŏ written by a scholar named Kang Yu-hyŏn (강유현; 康惟顯), Hyongnyon began work on his own biography on Kyunyŏ. The following year in 1075, he finished his biography of Kyunyŏ, known as the Taehwaŏm sujwa wŏnt'ong yangjung taesa Kyunyŏ-jŏn, often commonly known by the shortened form of Kyunyŏ-jŏn. In 1100, Hyŏngnyŏn was sent to the Liao court as a Goryeo envoy bearing gifts. In November 1105, Hyŏngnyŏn was appointed as the Superintendent Examiner of the Scholars of Chang-ak Pavilion (장락전학사; 長樂殿學士; changnakchŏn haksa).
