= Kyunyŏ =

Korean monk and poet (923–973)

Gyunyeo 균여

Personal life
- Born: Byeon Gyunyeo; 923 (8th days, 8th months in lunar) Hwangju, Hwanghae Province, Goryeo
- Died: 973 (aged about 50/1) (6th months in lunar) Goryeo
- Parents: Byeon Hwan-seong (변환성, 邊煥性) (father); Lady Jeom-myeong (점명, 占命) (mother)
- Notable work: Songs of the Ten Vows Samantabhara

Religious life
- Religion: Buddhism
- Profession: Goryeo Buddhist monk

Senior posting
- Teacher: Sikhyeon; Tanmun
- Period in office: 937–973?

Korean name
- Hangul: 균여
- Hanja: 均如
- RR: Gyunyeo
- MR: Kyunyŏ

Alternate name
- Hangul: 변균여
- Hanja: 邊均如
- RR: Byeon Gyunyeo
- MR: Pyŏn Kyunyŏ

Kyunyŏ (or Kyunyeo, Korean: 균여; Hanja: 均如; 923–973) was a Korean Buddhist monk and poet. He came from the Hwangju Byeon clan and his hometown was Hwangju. Among his works are the first extant collection of poetry in Korean, Songs of the Ten Vows Samantabhara, which can be found in The Life of Kuehne (c. 1075).

Gyunyeo played an important role in the spread of the Hwaeom (Korean Huayan) school of Buddhism.

== Overview ==
Gyunyeo was born in a village named Dundaeyeopchon in the northern region of Hwangju, Goryeo. Gyunyeo's mother was a diviner and according to a traditional story, Gyunyeo had an unattractive appearance and was abandoned by his parents, but then two crows covered him with their wings, prompting his parents to reconsider. By the age of 7 he already enjoyed reading verse. From a young age, he was immersed in the teachings of the Huayan sutras, particularly the Avatamsaka Sutra. At the age of 15, he studied under the monk Sikhyeon Hwasang (識賢和尙) at Buphingsa Temple (復興寺) and later devoted himself to Buddhist practice at Yeongtongsa Temple (靈通寺).

Gyunyeo made efforts to popularize Buddhism, composing the hymn "Bohyeon Shipwonga" (Songs of the Ten Vows Samantabhara) to convey Buddhist teachings in an accessible way. He worked towards unifying different Buddhist factions and traveled the country preaching Buddhism.

In 958 (King Gwangjong's 9th year), he held the position of "sigwan" (試官) and selected many accomplished monks. He attained the rank of "Dae Hwaeom Suja Won Tong Jung Daesa" (大華嚴首座圓通兩重大師) in the Buddhist hierarchy. He resided at Mahagapsa Temple (摩詞岬寺) for a period and later became the abbot of Guibeopsa Temple (歸法寺), which was established in his honor by King Gwangjong in 963.

Gyunyeo efforts united the Korean Huayan school, which had split into the Southern and Northern branches. Gyunyeo's teachings emphasized integration and harmonization of these differing viewpoints. Gyunyeo's teachings focused on a syncretic approach that included elements of indigenous beliefs and practical faith. His philosophy of "integrating nature and form (성상융회) aimed to harmonize the conceptual and phenomenal aspects of reality as well as to promote the unity of other dualities like the sacred and the mundane, as well as male and female.

Gyunyeo died in 973 CE. His main works include Suhyeonbanggyegi (搜玄方軌記) in 10 volumes, Gongmokjanggi (孔目章記) in 8 volumes, and Osipyo Mondapgi (五十余問答記).

The Songs of the Ten Vows Samantabhara (Bohyeon Shipjongwonwangga 普賢十種願往歌) is his most famous work. This hymn consists of eleven verses based on the ten vows of Bodhisattva Samantabhadra in the Avatamsaka Sutra. Each verse of the hymn is written in a ten-character format. The hymn is an expression of the Bodhisattva's commitment to benefiting all sentient beings and guiding them towards enlightenment.

Gyunyeo faced opposition from figures like Uicheon, who excluded Gyunyeo's writings from certain records due to their differing philosophical views. However, Gyunyeo's teachings regained prominence during the later spread of the Jogye Order of Korean Buddhism, and his writings were eventually included in the Goryeo Tripitaka.

== In popular culture ==
- Portrayed by Jung Seung-ho in the 2002–2003 KBS1 TV series The Dawn of the Empire.

== Further references ==
- Kyunyo-Jon: The Life, Times and Songs of a Tenth Century Korean Monk (University of Sydney East Asian Series)
- Lee, Peter H., 1961, "The Importance of the Kyunyŏ Chŏn (1075) in Korean Buddhism and Literature-Bhadra-Cari-Pranidhạna in Tenth Century Korea," Journal of the American Oriental Society 81 (4):409–414, JSTOR 595687
