= Buddhāvataṃsaka Sūtra =

Sutra of Mahāyāna Buddhism

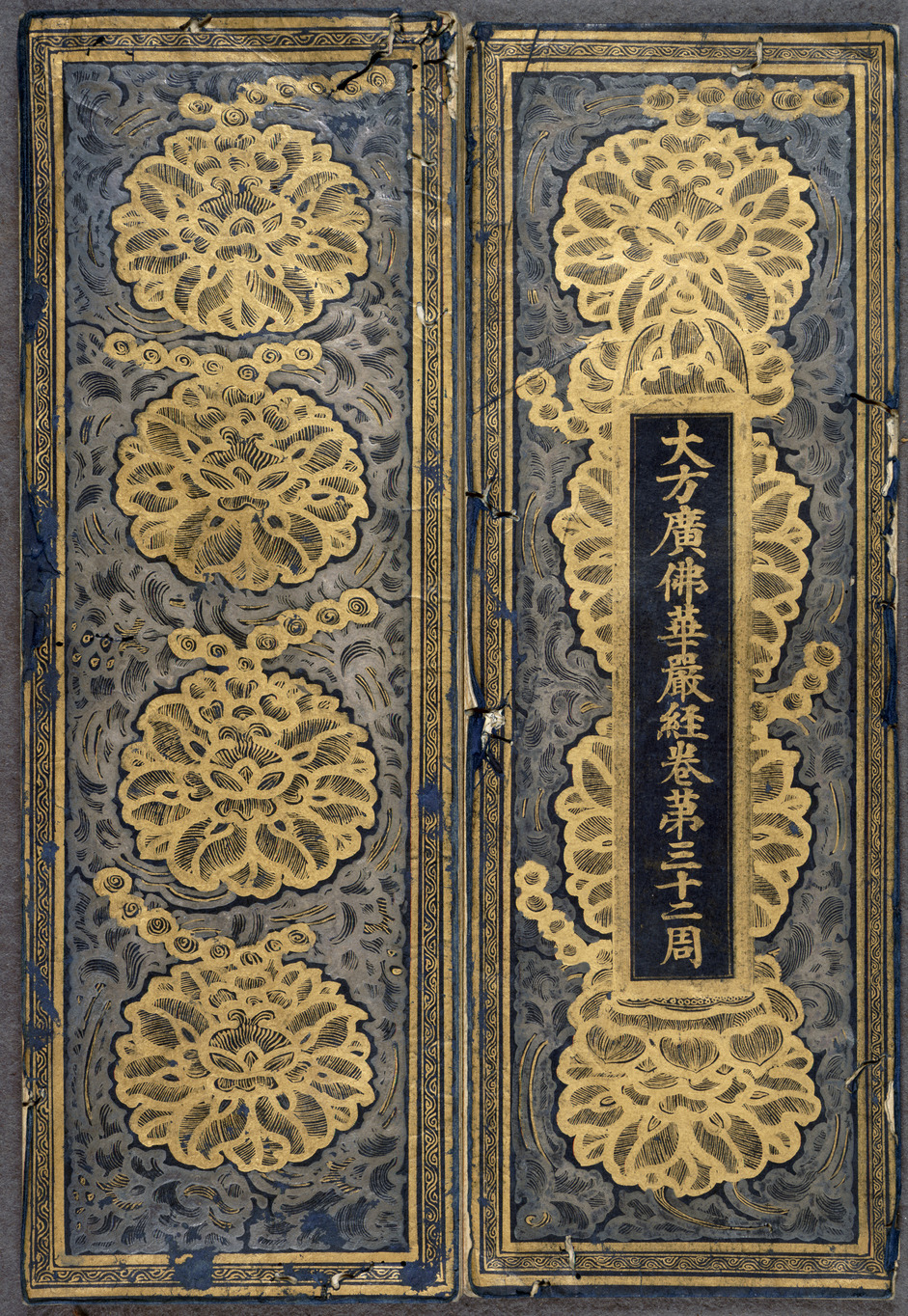
Covers of a Korean golden pigment sutra chapter. Indigo dyed paper, with rows of golden flower blossoms, and a title cartouche, c. 1400.

The Buddhāvataṃsaka-nāma-mahāvaipulya-sūtra (The Mahāvaipulya Sūtra named "Buddhāvataṃsaka") is one of the most influential Mahāyāna sutras of East Asian Buddhism. It is often referred to in short as the Avataṃsaka Sūtra. In Classical Sanskrit, avataṃsa, vataṃsa and uttaṃsa (from stem taṃs, meaning "to decorate") all mean garland, wreath, or any circular ornament, such as an earring; suffix -ka often functions either as a diminutive or plural. Thus, the title may be rendered in English as A Garland of Buddhas, Buddha Ornaments, or Buddha's Fine Garland. In Buddhist Hybrid Sanskrit, the term avataṃsaka means "a great number," "a multitude," or "a collection." This is matched by the Tibetan title of the sutra, which is A Multitude of Buddhas (Tibetan: sangs rgyas phal po che).

Modern scholars consider the Buddhāvataṃsaka to be a compilation of numerous smaller sutras, many of which originally circulated independently and then were later brought together into the larger mature Buddhāvataṃsaka. Many of these independent Buddhāvataṃsaka sutras survive in Chinese translation.

The text has been described by the translator Thomas Cleary "the most grandiose, the most comprehensive, and the most beautifully arrayed of the Buddhist scriptures." The Buddhāvataṃsaka describes a cosmos of infinite realms upon realms filled with an immeasurable number of Buddhas. This sutra was especially influential in East Asian Buddhism. The vision expressed in this work was the foundation for the creation of the Huayan school of Chinese Buddhism, which was characterized by a philosophy of interpenetration. The Huayan school is known as Hwaeom in Korea, Kegon in Japan and Hoa Nghiêm in Vietnam. The sutra is also influential in Chan Buddhism.

== Title ==
This work has been used in a variety of countries. Some major traditional titles include the following:

- Sanskrit: Buddhāvataṃsaka-nāma-mahāvaipulya-sūtra, The Mahāvaipulya Sūtra named "Buddhāvataṃsaka". Vaipulya ("extensive") refers to key Mahayana sutras. "Garland/wreath/adornment" refers to a manifestation of the beauty of Buddha's virtues or his inspiring glory. (Note: The Divyavadana also calls a Śrāvastī miracle Buddhāvataṃsaka, namely, he created countless emanations of himself seated on lotus blossoms.) The term avataṃsaka also means "a great number," "a multitude," or "a collection." This matches the content of the sutra, in which numerous Buddhas are depicted as manifestations of the cosmic Buddha Vairocana.
- Chinese: Dàfāngguǎng Fóhuāyán Jīng 大方廣佛華嚴經, commonly known as the Huāyán Jīng (華嚴經), meaning "Flower-adorned (Splendid & Solemn) Sūtra." Vaipulya here is translated as "corrective and expansive", fāngguǎng (方廣). Huā (華) means at once "flower" (archaic; namely 花) and "magnificence." Yán (嚴), short for zhuàngyán (莊嚴), means "to decorate (so that it is solemn, dignified)."
- Japanese: Daihōkō Butsu-kegon Kyō (大方広仏華厳経), usually known as the Kegon Kyō (華厳経). This title is identical to Chinese above, just in Shinjitai characters.
- Korean: 대방광불화엄경 Daebanggwang Bulhwaeom Gyeong or Hwaeom Gyeong (화엄경), the Sino-Korean pronunciation of the Chinese name.
- Vietnamese: Đại phương quảng Phật hoa nghiêm kinh, shortened to the Hoa nghiêm kinh, the Sino-Vietnamese pronunciation of the Chinese name.
- Tibetan: མདོ་ཕལ་པོ་ཆེ།, Wylie: mdo phal po che, Standard Tibetan Do phelpoche
- Tangut (romanized): Tha cha wa tha fa sho ldwi rye

According to a Dunhuang manuscript, this text was also known as the Bodhisattvapiṭaka Buddhāvataṃsaka Sūtra.

== History ==
The Buddhāvataṃsakasūtra was written in stages, beginning from at least 500 years after the death of the Buddha. One source claims that it is "a very long text composed of a number of originally independent scriptures of diverse provenance, all of which were combined, probably in Central Asia, in the late third or the fourth century CE." Japanese scholars such as Akira Hirakawa and Otake Susumu meanwhile argue that the Sanskrit original was compiled in India from sutras already in circulation which also bore the name "Buddhavatamsaka".

The Ten Stages sutra (Daśabhūmika) and the Flower Array sutra (Gaṇḍavyūha) have both survived in Sanskrit. There are two other parts of the Avatamsaka which have survived in Sanskrit, the Bhadracaryāpraṇidhāna (The Aspiration Prayer for Good Conduct), and the Anantabuddhakṣetraguṇodbhāvana-nāma-mahāyāna-sūtra (Cultivating the Qualities of Infinite Buddhafields). Apart from these four texts and some fragments, the rest of the sutra only survives in Chinese and Tibetan translations.

Two full Chinese translations of the Buddhāvataṃsakasūtra were made. Fragmentary translation probably began in the 2nd century CE, and the famous Ten Stages Sutra, often treated as an individual scripture, was first translated in the 3rd century. The first complete Chinese version was translated by Buddhabhadra around 420 in 60 scrolls with 34 chapters, and the second by Śikṣānanda, assisted by Bodhiruci around 699 in 80 scrolls with 40 chapters. There is also a translation of the Gaṇḍavyūha section by Prajñā around 798. The second translation includes more sutras than the first, and the Tibetan translation, which is still later, includes many differences with the 80 scrolls version. Scholars conclude that sutras were being added to the collection.

The single extant Tibetan version was translated from the original Sanskrit by Jinamitra et al. at the end of ninth century.

According to Paramārtha, a 6th-century monk from Ujjain in central India, the Buddhāvataṃsakasūtra is also called the "Bodhisattva Piṭaka." In his translation of the Mahāyānasaṃgrahabhāṣya, there is a reference to the Bodhisattva Piṭaka, which Paramārtha notes is the same as the Avataṃsaka Sūtra in 100,000 lines. Identification of the Buddhāvataṃsakasūtra as a "Bodhisattva Piṭaka" was also recorded in the colophon of a Chinese manuscript at the Mogao Caves: "Explication of the Ten Stages, entitled Creator of the Wisdom of an Omniscient Being by Degrees, a chapter of the Mahāyāna sūtra Bodhisattvapiṭaka Buddhāvataṃsaka, has ended."

== Overview ==
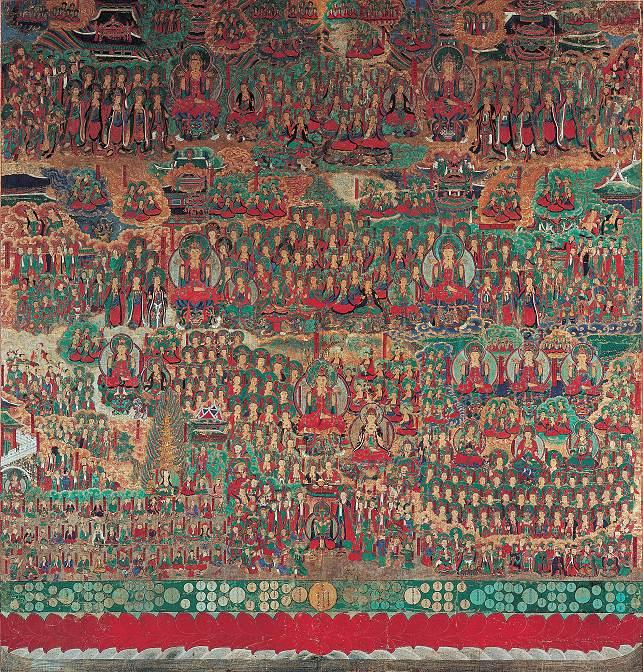
Illustration of the Avatamsaka Sutra at Songgwangsa in Suncheon, Korea. Joseon dynasty, 1644.

The sutra, among the longest Buddhist sutras, is a compilation of disparate texts on various topics such as the Bodhisattva path, the interpenetration of phenomena (dharmas), the omnipresence of Buddhahood, the miraculous powers of the Buddhas and bodhisattvas, the visionary powers of meditation, and the equality of things in emptiness.

According to Paul Demiéville, the Buddhāvataṃsaka collection is "characterized by overflowing visionary images, which multiply everything to infinity, by a type of monadology that teaches the interpenetration of the one whole and the particularized many, of spirit and matter" and by "the notion of a gradual progress towards liberation through successive stages and an obsessive preference for images of light and radiance." Likewise, Alan Fox has described the sutra's worldview as "fractal", "holographic", and "psychedelic".

=== Holistic cosmos ===
The East Asian Buddhist view of the text is that it expresses the infinite universe as seen by a Buddha (the Dharmadhatu), who sees all phenomena as empty and thus infinitely interpenetrating, from the point of view of enlightenment. This interpenetration is described in the Buddhāvataṃsakasūtra as the perception "that the fields full of assemblies, the beings and aeons which are as many as all the dust particles, are all present in every particle of dust." Thus, a Buddha's view of reality is also said to be "inconceivable; no sentient being can fathom it".

The following passage from the Buddhāvataṃsaka describes this holistic idea of universal interpenetration or interfusion which sees the total sum of all things as being contained in each individual phenomena:

Children of the Buddha, just as if there was a great sūtra, as extensive as the great universe, in which are written down all phenomena in the great universe. That is to say, in it is written about the phenomena in the great enclosing iron mountains, as extensively as the great enclosing iron mountains; it is written about the phenomena on earth, as extensively as the earth; it is written about the phenomena in the medium universe, as extensively as the medium universe; it is written about the phenomena in the small universe, as extensively as the small universe. In the same vein, all phenomena – be they of the four continents, or the great oceans, Sumeru mountains, the palaces of the gods in the heavens of the realm of desire, the palaces in the realm of form, and the palaces of the formless realm – are written down to an equal length. Even though this sūtra is as extensive as the great universe, it can be fully comprised within a single particle of dust. As it is with one particle, so it is with all particles of dust.

This idea would later become central in East Asian Buddhist traditions like the Huayan school and Zen.

=== Mind-only and emptiness ===
Paul Williams notes that the sutra contains both the "mind-only" (cittamatra, Yogacara) teachings and the emptiness teachings (associated with Prajñaparamita and Madhyamaka). The sutra thus teaches that all things are empty of inherent existence and also speaks of "pure untainted awareness or consciousness (amala-citta) as the ground of all phenomena".

Teachings about emptiness and mind-only can be found throughout the sutra, especially in chapters 10, 1 6, and 22 of the 60 fascicle version (T 278). The sutra contains various statements affirming the mind-only teaching. For example, it states: "The triple world is only mind", and "Everything is created by the mind alone." It also affirms emptiness when it states: "The triple world is completely empty. That is the vision of the Buddhas;" and "all dharmas lack intrinsic nature; to understand the nature of dharmas like this is to see Vairocana."

=== The power of the Buddhas ===
The Buddhāvataṃsakasūtra also highlights the visionary and mystical power of attaining the spiritual wisdom which sees the nature of the world:

Endless action arises from the mind; from action arises the multifarious world. Having understood that the world's true nature is mind, you display bodies of your own in harmony with the world. Having realized that this world is like a dream, and that all Buddhas are like mere reflections, that all principles [dharma] are like an echo, you move unimpeded in the world (Trans in Gomez, 1967: lxxxi)

As a result of their infinite power and omnipotence, Buddhas have the magical ability to create and manifest infinite number of forms all over the universe, and they do this effortlessly and without any calculation, through an infinite number of skillful means (upaya), out of great compassion for all beings. As the sutra states:

In all atoms of all lands, Buddha enters, each and every one,
Producing miracle displays for sentient beings:
Such is the way of Vairocana....
The techniques of the Buddhas are inconceivable,
All appearing in accord with beings' minds....
In each atom the Buddhas of all times
Appear, according to inclinations;
While their essential nature neither comes nor goes,
By their vow power they pervade the worlds. (Cleary 1984–7: I, Bk 4)

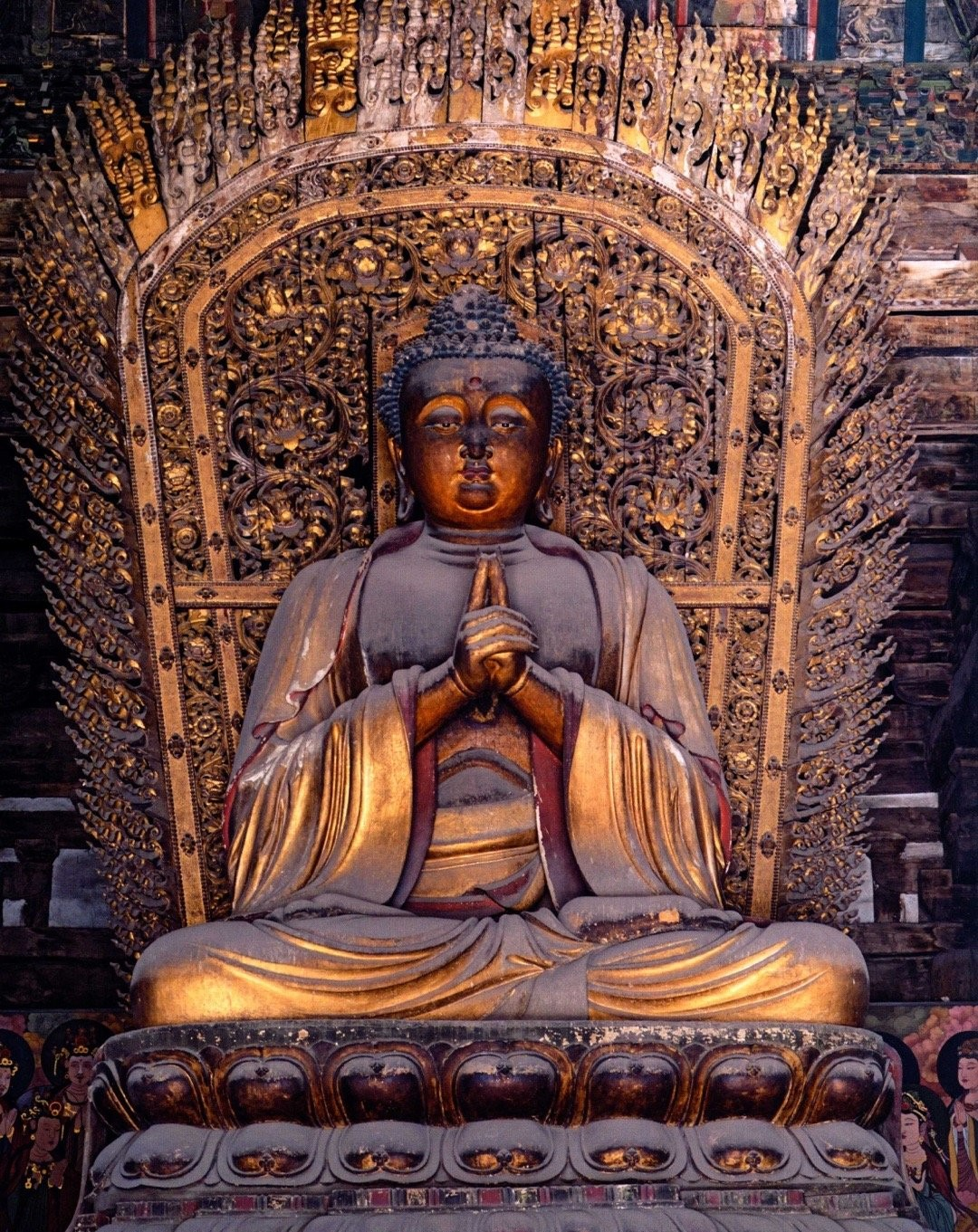
Jin Dynasty (1115–1234) statue of Vairocana (Chinese: 大日如来; pinyin: Dàrì Rúlái), Shanhua Temple, Datong, Shanxi, China.

=== Vairocana Buddha ===
The sutra also discusses how there are an immeasurable number of Buddhas and their buddha-fields which are said to be infinite, representing a vast cosmic view of reality. One key Buddha in this sutra is the Buddha Vairocana ("Radiance" or "The Illuminator"). Vairocana is a supreme cosmic Buddha who is the source of light and enlightenment of the 'Lotus universe', and who is said to contain all world systems within his entire cosmic body.

The Avatamsaka sutra also states that the wisdom of the Buddha (the Tathagata) is present everywhere in the universe, indeed, it is present within every living being. Thus, the sutra states (in chapter 32, Manifestation of the Tathagata):

Son of Buddha, the wisdom of Tathagata is present everywhere. Why? Son of Buddha, in the class of living beings there is no place where the wisdom of Tathagata is not present. Why is it that? The wisdom of Tathagata is not established due to grasping the discrimination/consciousness, because the omniscient wisdom, the self-existent wisdom and the non-obstructed wisdom perfectly appear in total disconnection with discrimination.

According to Paul Williams, the Buddha "is said or implied at various places in this vast and heterogeneous sutra to be the universe itself, to be the same as 'absence of intrinsic existence' or emptiness, and to be the Buddha's all-pervading omniscient awareness." The very body of Vairocana is also seen as a reflection of the whole universe:

The body of [Vairocana] Buddha is inconceivable. In his body are all sorts of lands of sentient beings. Even in a single pore are countless, immeasurable vast oceans.

Also, for the Buddhāvataṃsakasūtra, the historical Buddha Sakyamuni is simply a magical emanation of the cosmic Buddha Vairocana.

=== Bodhisattva stages ===
The point of all the skillful teachings of the Buddha is to lead all living beings through the bodhisattva stages (Bhūmis) and to final Buddhahood. These stages of spiritual attainment are also widely discussed in various parts of the sutra (book 15, book 26). Indeed, according to a detailed study of the sutra by Itō Zuiei, some of the most important teachings in the sutra are related to the bodhisattva path, its primary cause (bodhicitta) and bodhisattva activity (bodhisattva-caryā). The Daśabhūmika Sūtra chapter describes ten bhūmis in detail.

== Sutra overview ==
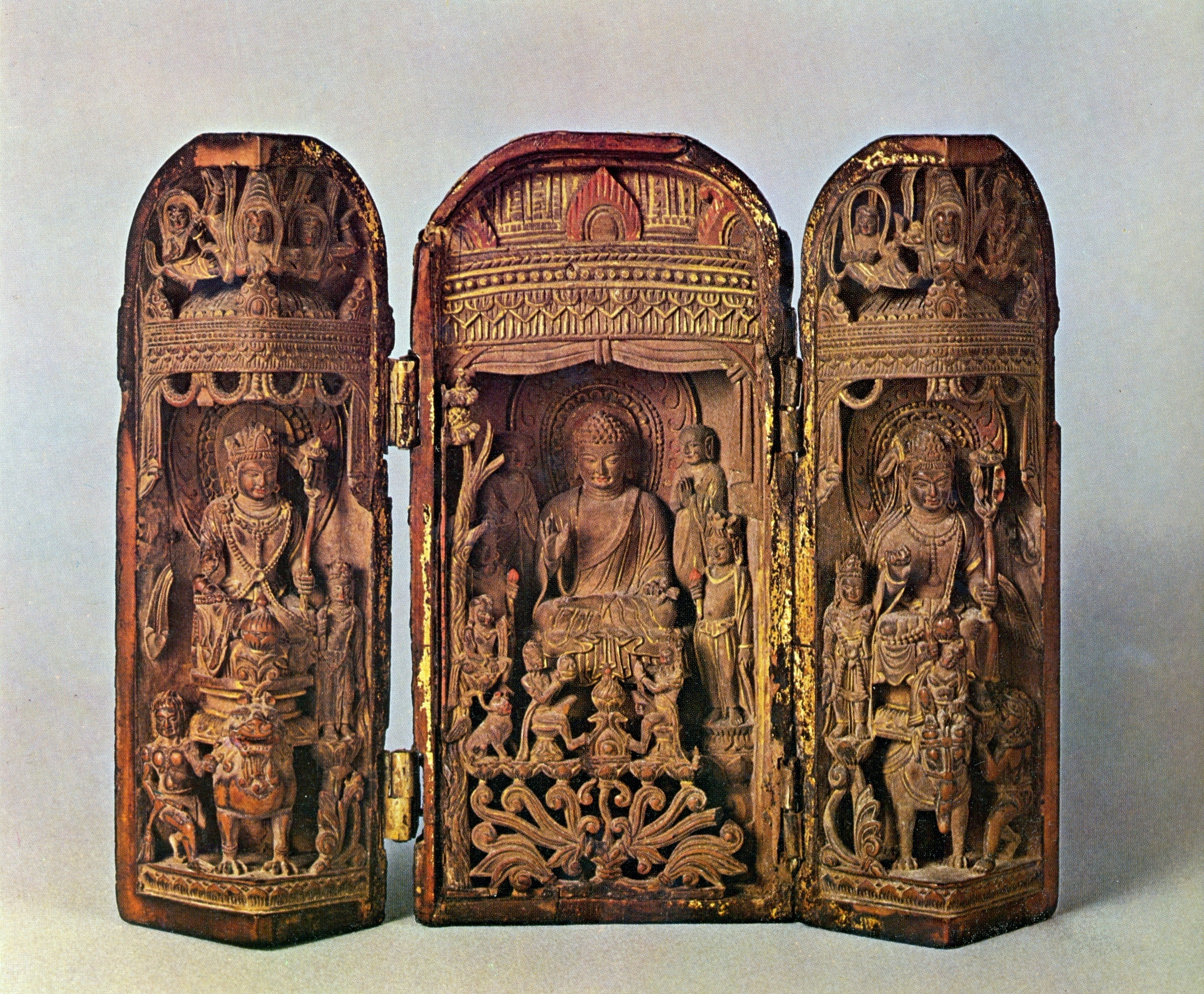
A Korean wooden depiction of the "three holy ones" (Vairocana Buddha, Samantabhadra and Manjushri), a triad associated with the Avatamsaka sutra, Songgwangsa temple in Suncheon.

Luis O. Gómez notes that there is an underlying order to the Avatamsaka collection. The discourses in the sutra version with thirty nine books (or chapters) are delivered to eight different audiences or "assemblies" in seven locations such as Bodh Gaya and Tusita Heaven. Each "assembly" includes various locales, doctrinal topics and characters.

The following list of assemblies is based on the exegesis of the Chinese Huayan school. In Huayan commentaries, the main "assemblies" which the collection is traditionally divided into are:

=== 1. The Bodhimaṇḍa (Books 1–6) ===
This assembly of bodhisattvas and other beings is gathered at the Bodhimaṇḍa (the seat of awakening under the bodhi tree in Bodh Gaya, Magadha), where the Buddha is seated. It is depicted as both the historical place as well as a transcendent palace filled with multicolored jewels and lights. In these chapters, various bodhisattvas, including Samantabhadra, and the Buddha, discuss the nature of reality, the infinity of the universe, how Buddhahood is omnipresent throughout the universe (which is really one vast Buddhafield) and how bodhisattvas fill the countless worlds in the universe. Chapter six discusses the Buddha Vairocana, his vow to reach Buddhahood long ago, and his path of practice.

=== 2. The Hall of Universal Light (Books 7–12) ===
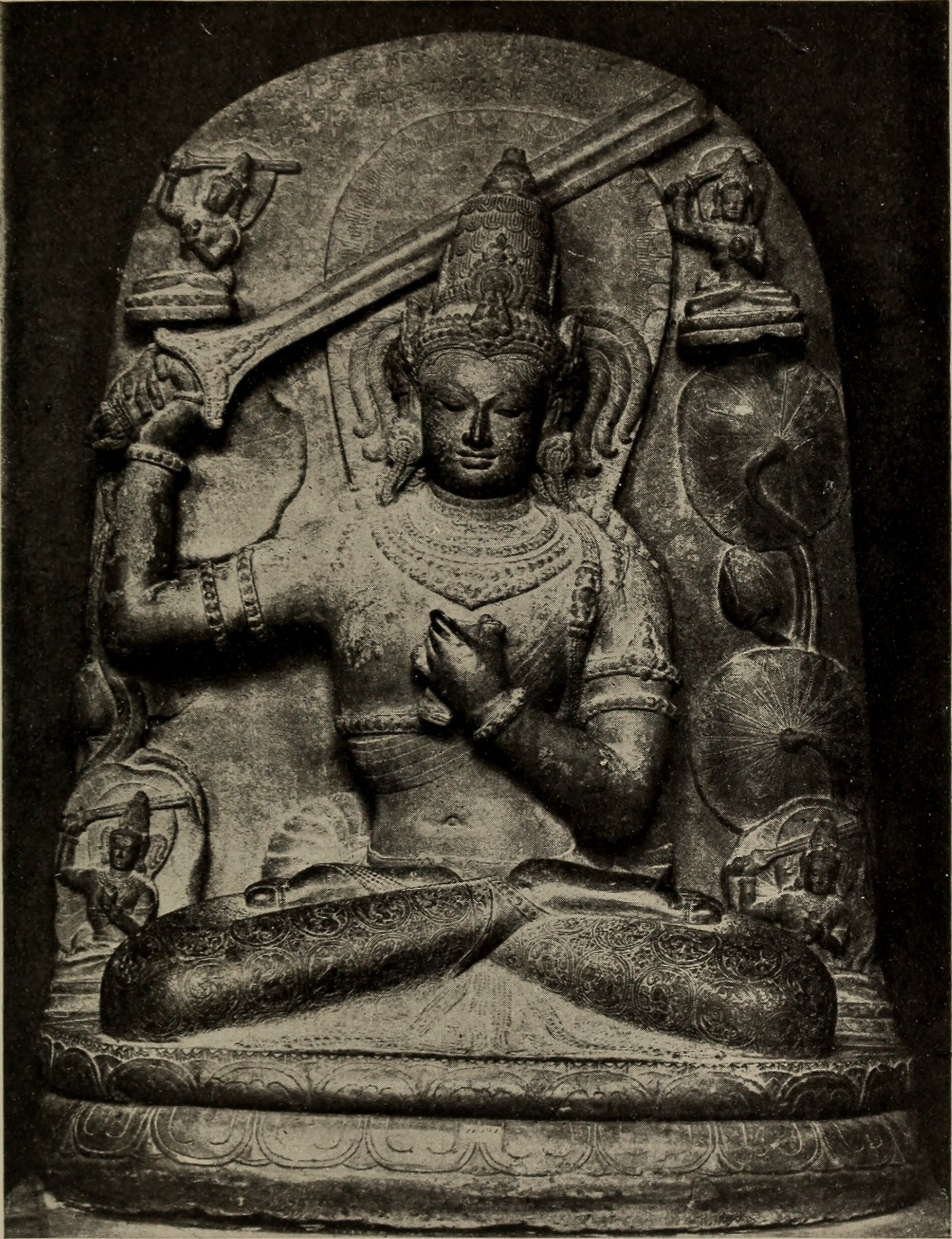
Indian statue of bodhisattva Mañjuśrī, holding the sword of wisdom (which symbolizes prajñaparamita).

This assembly is located in the "Hall of Universal Light", a grand palace which is coextensive with the Bodhimaṇḍa. In this set of books, the bodhisattva Mañjuśrī arrives, and empowered by the Buddha's power, gives various teachings on the path. Mañjuśrī teaches on the four noble truths and the Buddha sends a light from his feet that illuminates the ten directions (symbolizing the all-pervading quality of the Buddha's wisdom). Mañjuśrī then gives further teachings on bodhisattvas, and on pure conduct. The 11th chapter is a popular text, widely known as the "pure practices chapter".

In chapter 12, the bodhisattva Bhadraśrī also teaches the Bodhisattva Path, discussing bodhicitta, faith, and merit, and recites a set of verses which were seen as a dharani in India, the Dharani of the Jewelled Comet (Ratnolkadhāraṇī).

=== 3. Indra's Palace (Books 13–18) ===
Without leaving his seat at the bodhi tree, the Buddha ascends to Indra's (Sakra) palace in Trāyastriṃśa Heaven at the summit of Mount Sumeru and he is praised by Sakra in verse. Many bodhisattvas arrive from other realms and recite verses on the nature of reality, praising the Buddha and bodhisattvas.

In book 15, a bodhisattva named Dharmamati teaches on how the bodhisattva path progresses through ten abodes (viharas):

1. Awakening the Aspiration to Enlightenment
2. Preparing the Ground
3. Cultivating the Practices
4. Noble Birth (i.e. into the family of the buddhas)
5. Perfection of Skilful Means
6. Rectification of the Mind
7. Nonregression
8. Childlike Simplicity
9. Crown Prince of the Dharma
10. Consecration

Dharmamati then teaches on spiritual conduct and the importance of analytical inquiry for beginners on the path (book 16). In book 17, Dharmamati teaches about the arousing of the mind of awakening (bodhicittotpāda) and how its merit is greater than any kind of act of worship, no matter how vast. In book 18, Dharmamati discusses the main practices of bodhisattvas: heedfulness (apramāda), the perfections (pāramitās), the ten "inexhaustible treasuries" and others.

=== 4. Yama's Palace (Books 19–22) ===
The Buddha ascends to Yama's palace (Yama is the god of death), is welcomed with verses of praise. Ten more bodhisattvas arrive and sing verses on the nature of reality, emptiness and the mind. These verses also discuss how the world is a mental creation, it includes the famous simile which compares the mind to a painter and the world to a painting.

In book 21, one of the bodhisattvas, Guṇavana, teaches the ten practices (carya) of bodhisattvas (which also roughly correspond to the Pāramitā):

1. Giving Delight (corresponding to dāna)
2. Bestowing Benefits (śīla)
3. Nonresentment (kṣānti)
4. Inexhaustible Practice (vīrya)
5. Transcending Ignorance and Confusion (dhyāna)
6. Skilful Manifestation (upāya)
7. Great Vows (Mahapranidhana)
8. Using Power & Veneration (Bala)
9. Cultivation of Good Qualities (Praṇidhāna)
10. Cultivation of Truth (jñāna)

In book 22, Guṇavana teaches the "Ten Inexhaustible Treasuries" (which summarize the bodhisattva path in from a different point of view). They are:

1. Faith
2. Ethical conduct
3. Repentance
4. Shame (with regard to past wrongdoing)
5. Acquiring Knowledge (of the Dharma)
6. Generosity
7. Wisdom
8. Mindfulness
9. Retention (of what has been learnt)
10. Eloquence (in teaching the Dharma)

=== 5. Tushita Heaven (Books 23–25) ===
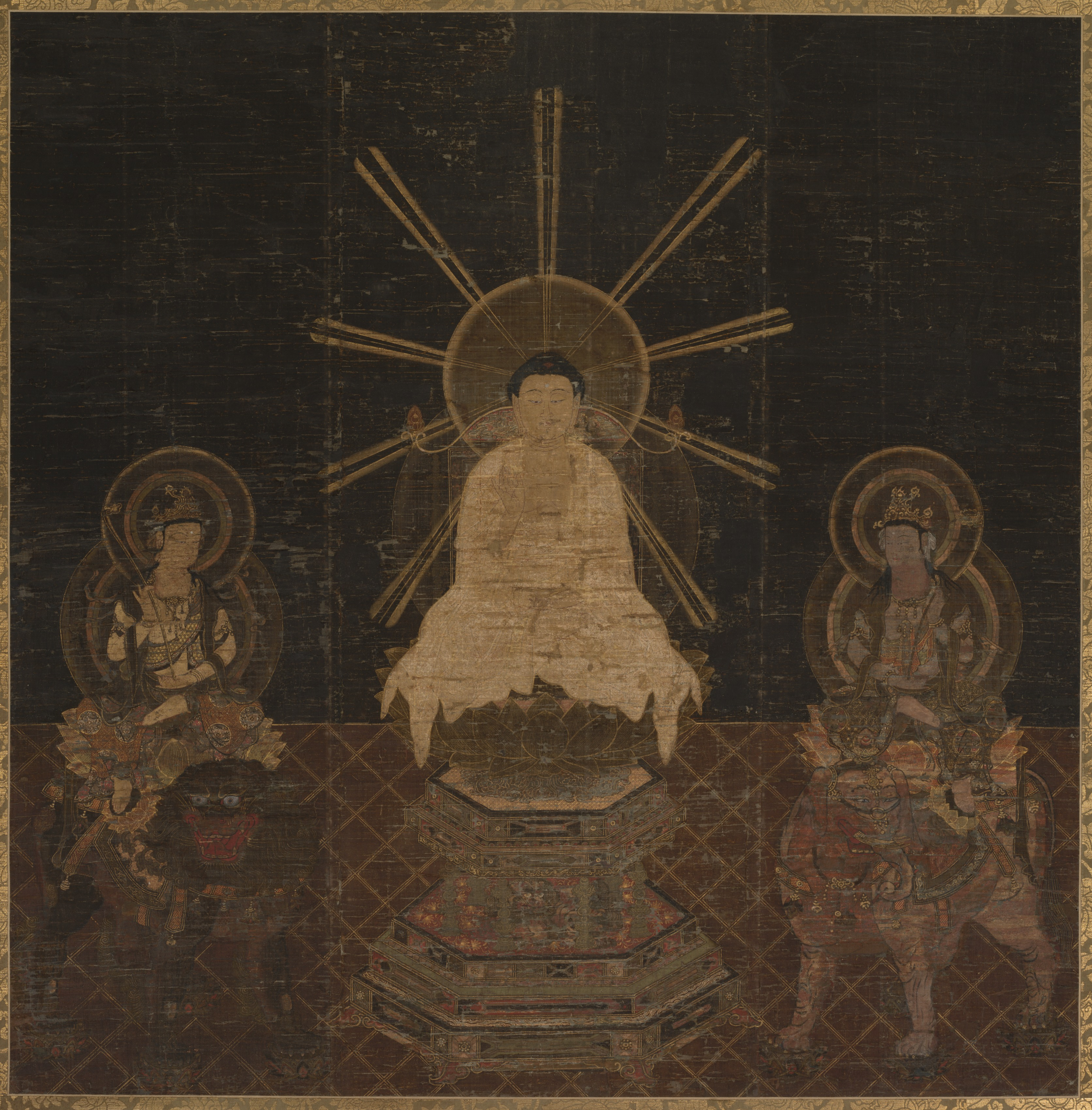
Shakyamuni Buddha attended by Manjushri (left) and Samantabhadra (right), Japan, Kamakura period.

Paralleling the last two books, the Buddha arrives as Tushita heaven without leaving from his past abodes as well. He radiates light in the ten directions and ten more bodhisattvas arrive, singing verses to the Buddha. In book 25, the bodhisattva Vajradhvaja enters samadhi and is blessed by 100,000 Buddhas. Then Vajradhvaja teaches the ten aspects of the bodhisattvas' transfer (pariṇāmana) of merit.

This is the second longest book in the Avatamsaka and it was known as the Vajradhvaja Sūtra or Vajradhvaja Dhāraṇī to the Indian scholar Shantideva.

=== 6. Paranirmitavaśavartin Heaven (Book 26) ===
This is the Ten Stages Sutra (Daśabhūmika sutra), which focuses on explaining the ten bhūmis (levels or stages) of the bodhisattva path. It was well known in India as the main source for the bodhisattva stages and was widely cited by Shantideva. Vasubandhu wrote an influential commentary on this sutra, the Dasabhūmikabhāsya. Another commentary survives in Chinese translation, the Daśabhūmikavibhāṣā (十住毘婆沙論, Shi zhu piposha lun, Taisho # 1521). It is attributed to Nagarjuna and was translated by Kumārajīva's translation team.

=== 7. The Hall of Universal Light (Books 27–38) ===
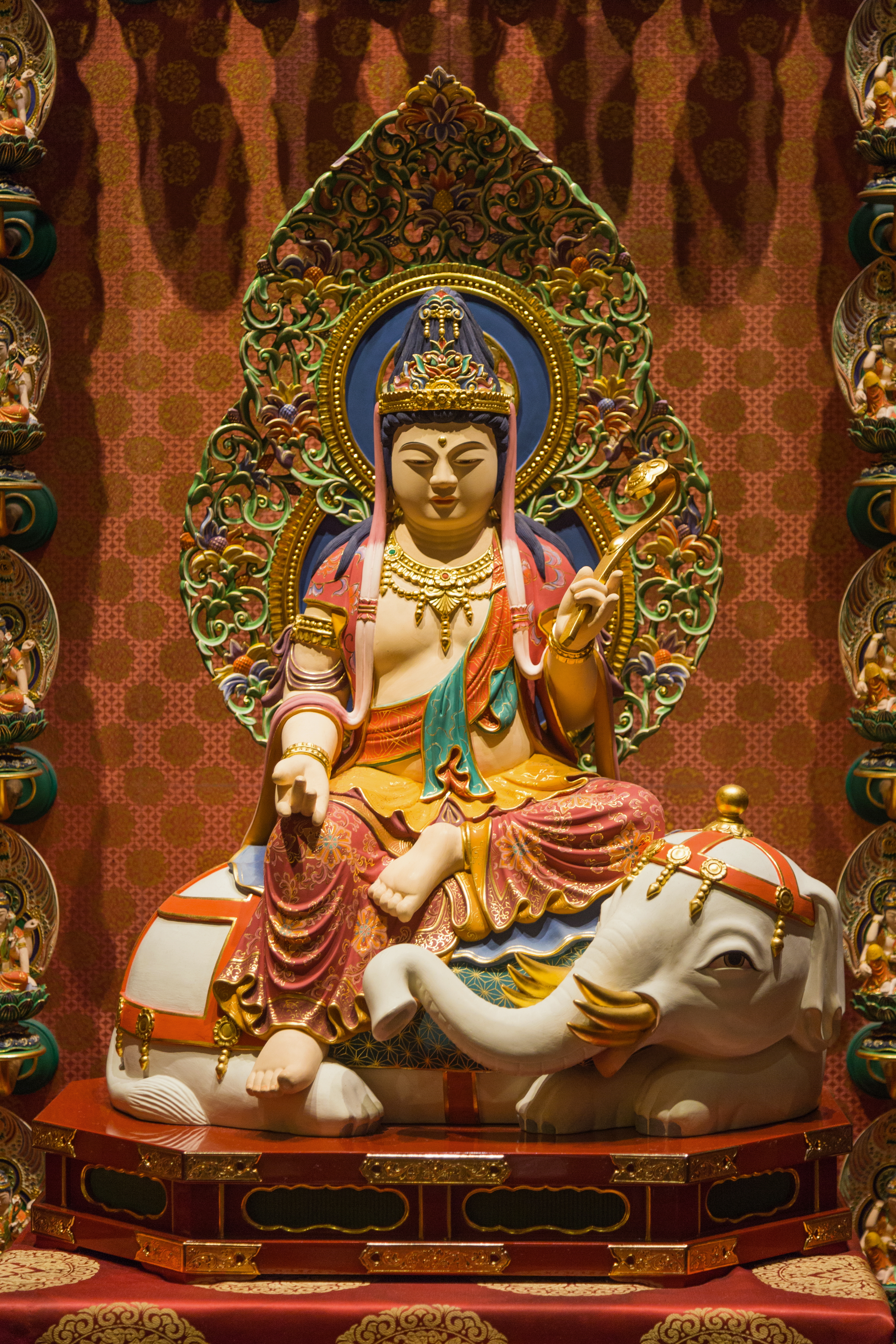
A Chinese style statue of the bodhisattva Samantabhadra, mounted on an elephant (which symbolizes his steadfast vows).

The Buddha returns to the hall of universal light and Samantabhadra re-appears, becoming the main teacher of this assembly. In book 27, Samantabhadra teaches on ten types of meditative absorption (samadhi) and the various powers that they bestow on those who master them (such as being able to travel freely to all realms in the universe). In book 28, Samantabhadra similarly discusses ten supernormal powers (abhijñā) mastered by bodhisattvas (such as telepathy etc.), and in book 29, he discusses ten types of patience (kṣānti), which mainly refers to an acceptance of the illusory and unarisen nature of reality (i.e. anutpattikadharmakṣānti).

Book 30 is taught by the Buddha himself, and it discusses the incalculable (asaṅkhyeya) and infinite nature of the universe and the number of beings contained in it. Books 31 and 32 are taught by the bodhisattva Cittaraja and discuss time and space respectively. Cittaraja states that time is relative, and that in some worlds, an entire aeon (kalpa) is but a day in other worlds. Books 33 discusses the various qualities of the Buddhas and in book 34, Samantabhadra teaches the attributes of the ten bodies of the Buddha.

Book 35 discusses the manifestation of the Buddha in the world. Shakyamuni discusses his birth in Tushita, where he was a bodhisattva named Vairocana ('Shakyamuni' and 'Vairocana' are often used interchangeably in the Avatamsaka). In book 36, Samantabhadra discusses the bodhisattva path in brief, including fifty qualities that must be cultivated.

Book 37 is an influential text titled The Manifestation of the Tathagata (Tathāgatotpattisaṃbhava) which also once circulated as an independent sutra. This book discusses the nature of Buddhahood and its manifestation in the world. Samantabhadra describes ten aspects of Buddhahood in detail and affirms that Buddhahood is present in every particle in the physical universe, as well as in the body and mind of every living being.

In book 38 (the third longest book in the sutra), titled Disengagement from the World, Samantabhadra teaches on the Buddhist path to awakening. He is asked two hundred questions on the bodhisattva's career and provides ten answers to each one, providing a comprehensive set of guidelines and practices for bodhisattvas. These answers include: "ten types of spiritual teachers, ten kinds of effort, ten sources of contentment, ten ways of bringing sentient beings to maturity, ten kinds of moral discipline and so on."

=== 8. Jetavana Pavilion (Book 39) ===
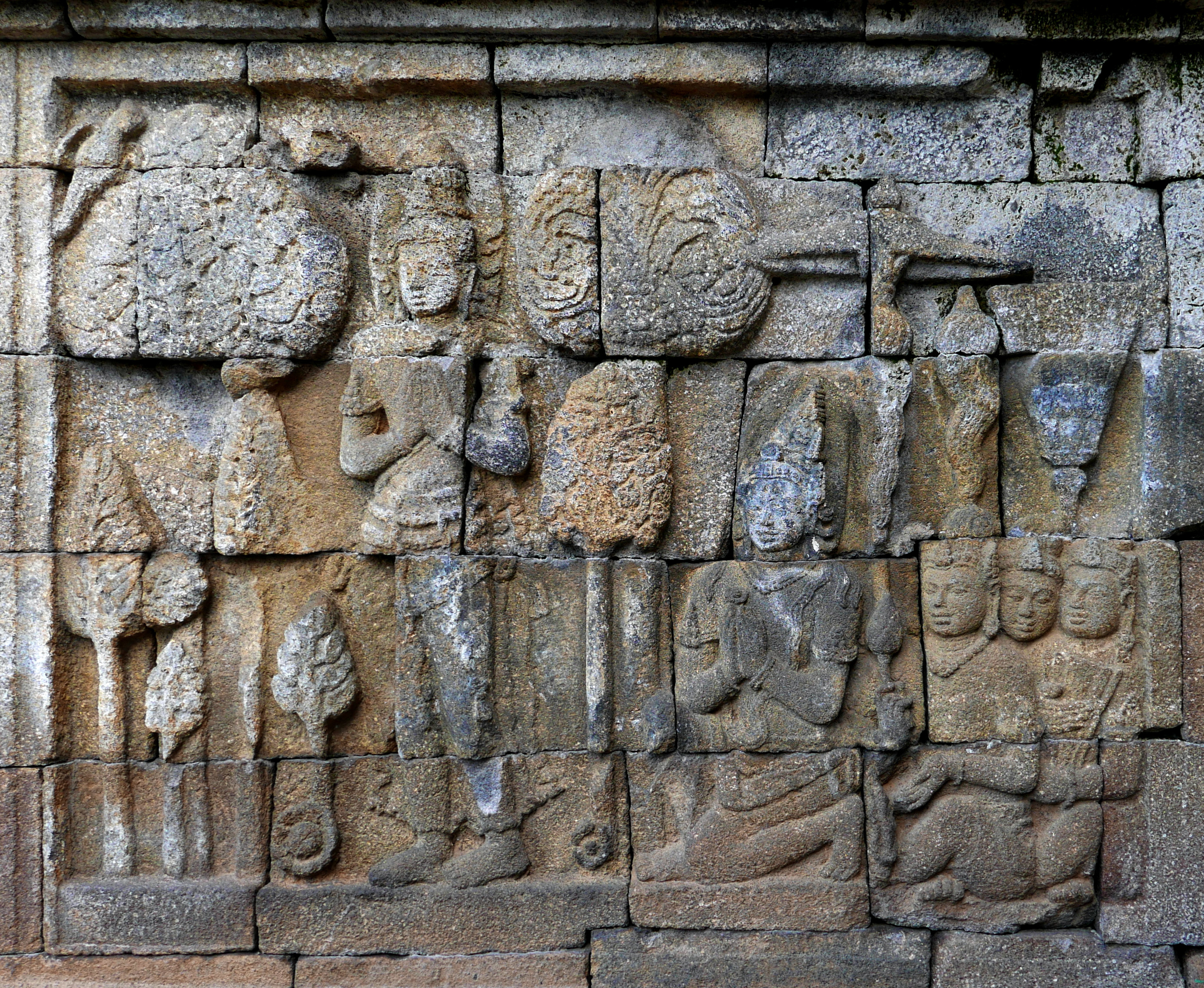
Sudhana worships Maitreya, from Borobudur

Book thirty nine, entitled Entering the Dharmarealm (入法界品) in the Chinese, is also known as the Gaṇḍavyūha Sūtra (Stem Array, or Supreme Array Sutra). It is the longest book in the Avatamsaka. It contains the story of the bodhisattva Sudhana's spiritual career. Sudhana is a young man who hears Manjushri teaching and is inspired to seek awakening. Manjushri sends him to his first teacher, and this begins Sudhana's quest, which leads him to study under a series of teachers of all types (monastic, and lay, male and female, from all social and economic classes), including great bodhisattvas like Avalokiteshvara.

Each teacher imparts to Sudhana their own special bodhisattva practice which helps Sudhana deepen his wisdom. The book's climax comes when Sudhana meets the bodhisattva Maitreya, who guides him to enter a great tower called "Matrix Adorned with the Splendours of Vairocana" (vairocana-vyūhālāṅkāra-garbha). Within the tower, Sudhana has a grand vision of infinite worlds, each of which contains forms of Maitreya guiding beings to awakening. He also sees countless assemblies of beings with Buddhas teaching them and with Sudhana present in each one.

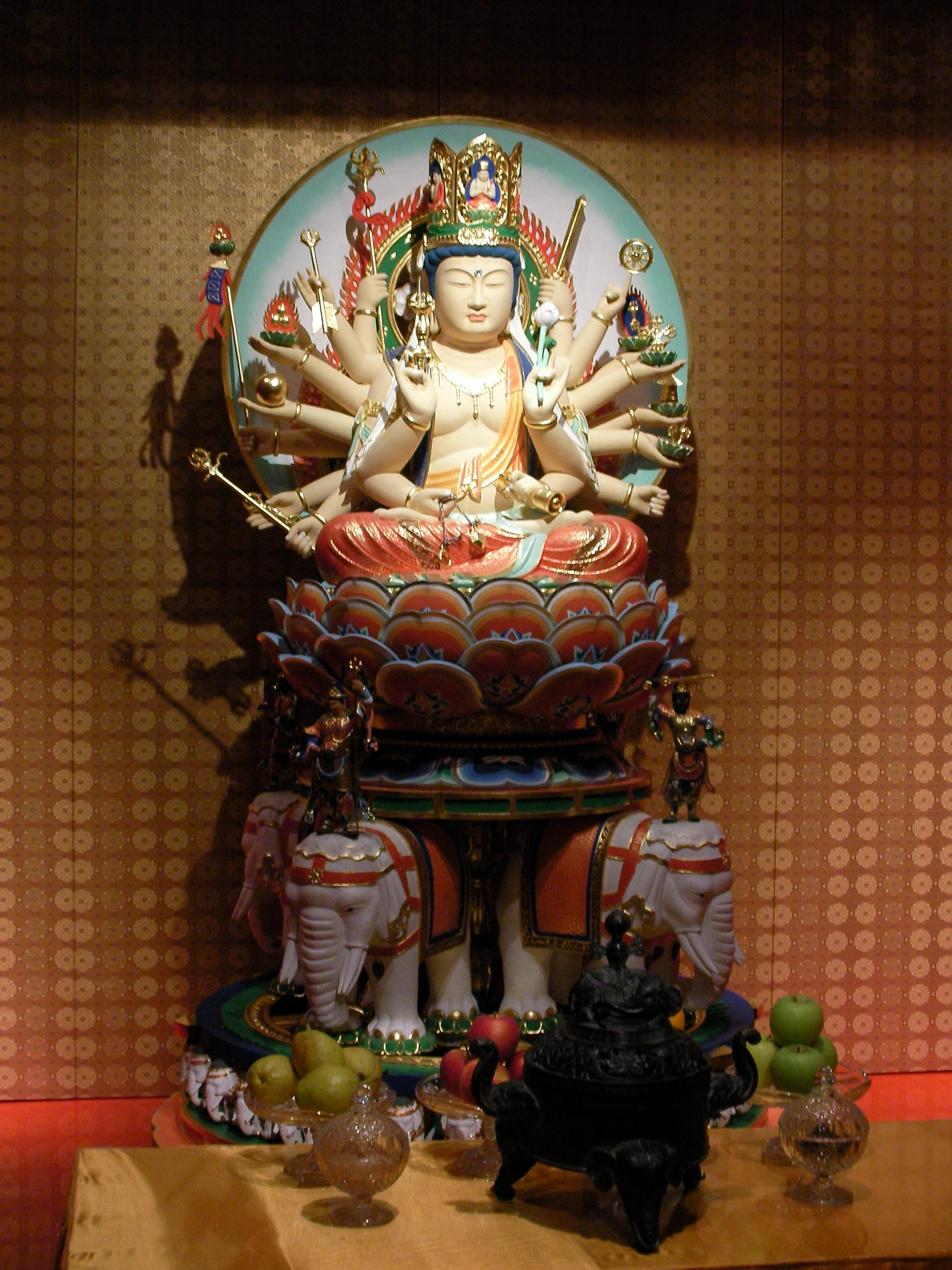
Eighteen armed Samantabhadra statue from Malaysia

Sudhana then meets Manjushri and Samantabhadra which confirm his attainment with further visions, including his final merging into the body of Samantabhadra (which contains the entire universe).

Following Sudhana's mystic union with Samantabhadra, Samantabhadra recites a popular series of verses which describe the bodhisattva path, the aspiration for enlightenment and various bodhisattva vows. The core of these aspirations are the ten great vows of Samantabhadra, which are: "(1) to pay homage to all the buddhas; (2) to glorify the qualities of all the tathāgatas; (3) to make ample offerings to all the buddhas; (4) to confess and repent of all one's sins; (5) to rejoice in the merits of others; (6) always to request the preaching of the dharma; (7) to entreat enlightened beings to remain in the world; (8) always to study the teachings of the buddha; (9) always to respond to sentient beings according to their various needs; and (10) to dedicate all merits to sentient beings that they may achieve buddhahood."

These verses are known as the Bhadracaripraṇidhāna (Vows of Good Conduct) or Ārya-samantabhadra-caryā-praṇidhāna-rāja (The Royal Vow to follow the Noble Course of Conduct of Samantabhadra). This text which concludes the entire Avatamsaka was very popular in India, East Asia and in Himalayan Buddhism, and it is cited in numerous sources. It was considered to be a dhāraṇī and recited individually as a meritorious text.

The text was known to Indian authors like Bhavya, Śantideva, and Kamalaśīla. The Tibetan canon also contains five commentaries on the individual verses, attributed to figures like Nāgārjuna, Diṅnāga, Śākyamitra, Bhadrāpaṇa, and Vasubandhu.

== Individual sutras ==
Various "chapters" of the Buddhāvataṃsaka collection also circulated as individual sutras. These include the Ten Stages (Daśabhūmika), the Flower Array (Gaṇḍavyūha), the Manifestation of the Tathagatha, the Bhadracaryāpraṇidhāna, and the Anantabuddhakṣetraguṇodbhāvana-nāma-mahāyāna-sūtra.

=== Ten Stages Sutra ===
The sutra is also well known for its detailed description of the course of the bodhisattva's practice through ten stages where the Ten Stages Sutra, or Daśabhūmika Sūtra (十地經, Wylie: 'phags pa sa bcu pa'i mdo), is the name given to this chapter of the Avataṃsaka Sūtra. This sutra gives details on the ten stages (bhūmis) of development a bodhisattva must undergo to attain supreme enlightenment. The ten stages are also depicted in the Laṅkāvatāra Sūtra and the Śūraṅgama Sūtra. The sutra also touches on the subject of the development of the "aspiration for Enlightenment" (bodhicitta) to attain supreme buddhahood.

=== The Flower Array Sutra ===
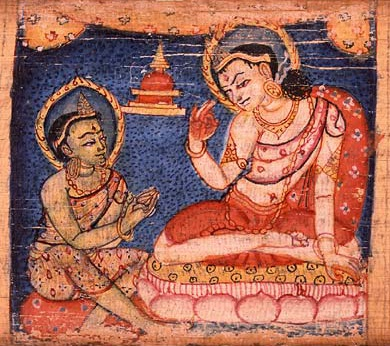
Sudhana learning from one of the fifty-two teachers along his journey toward enlightenment. Sanskrit manuscript, 11-12th century.

The last chapter of the Avatamsaka circulates as a separate and important text known as the Gaṇḍavyūha Sutra ("flower-array", or "bouquet"; 入法界品 'Entering the Dharma Realm'). Considered the "climax" of the larger text, this section details the pilgrimage of the layman Sudhana to various lands (worldly and supra-mundane) at the behest of the bodhisattva Mañjuśrī to find a spiritual friend who will instruct him in the ways of a bodhisattva. According to Luis Gomez, this sutra can also be "regarded as emblematic of the whole collection."

Despite the former being at the end of the Avataṃsaka, the Gaṇḍavyūha and the Ten Stages are generally believed to be the oldest written chapters of the sutra.

=== The Aspiration Prayer for Good Conduct ===
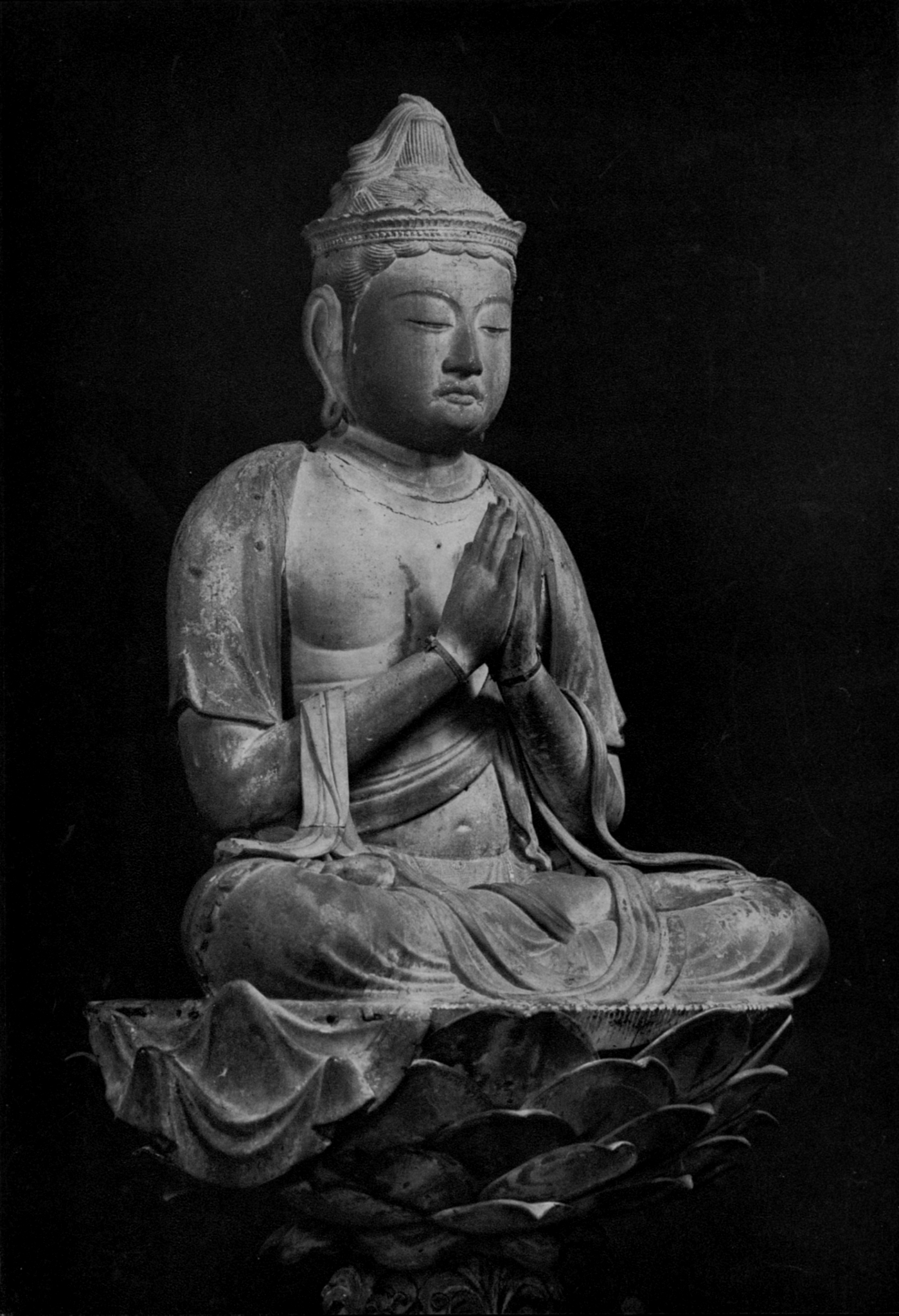
Japanese sculpture of Samantabhadra (Fugen), Heian period (794–1185).

The Bhadracaryā-praṇidhāna (or Samantabhadra-caryā-praṇidhāna) was often added to the end of the Avataṃsaka-sūtra, at the very end of the Gaṇḍavyūha. The prayer contains the ten vows of Samantabhadra which encapsulate the core essence of the commitments and actions of all past and future buddhas. However, not all translations of the Gaṇḍavyūha contain this prayer (Śikṣānanda's Chinese Gaṇḍavyūha does not include it, for example), and some translators translated the prayer independently, like Buddhabhadra.

The Bhadracaryā was influential in India, and has been influential on Nepalese Newar Buddhism, Tibetan Buddhism and Chinese Buddhism. It is cited in numerous sources as well as in numerous Buddhist inscriptions. It was also considered a dharani with magical powers.

Furthermore, there is an Indian commentary to the Bhadracaryā-praṇidhāna, which was translated into Tibetan in various editions attributed to various authors, including Nagarjuna - which is unlikely, since the commentary knows of Aryadeva's and Mātr̥ceṭa's work. According to Dr. Maria Vasylieva, the most likely author is a certain *Bhadrapana. A Sanskrit manuscript of one edition of this commentary is held by a collection in China.

=== The Manifestation of the Tathagatha sutra ===
The Tathāgatotpattisaṃbhava sūtra (The Manifestation of the Tathagatha sutra), which corresponds to chapter 32 of the full Buddhāvataṃsaka translation of Buddhabhadra (Taisho Tripitaka no. 278), focuses on the nature of the Buddha (Tathāgata) and his activities. According to Imre Hamar, this sutra "is a precursor to the tathāgatagarbha theory, the idea of universal access to buddhahood, as it stresses that all living beings have the wisdom of the Buddha, but due to their defilements, they are not able to see it. The Buddha's mission is to reveal this fact to living beings."

A version of this text was also translated into Chinese by Dharmarakṣa in 292 CE as an independent sutra, the Fo shuo rulai xingxian jing (佛說如來興顯經; The Appearance of Tathāgata as Related by the Buddha; *Tathāgatotapattisaṃbhavanirdeśa). The Tathāgatotpattisaṃbhava is quoted in numerous Indian Mahayana sources, including by the Sūtrasamuccaya, the Ratnagotravibhāgavyākhyā, Vasubandhu's Vyākhyāyukti.

=== The Vajradhvaja sūtra and the Ratnolkādhāraṇī ===
Both the Vajra-flag sutra (Vajradhvaja sūtra, also known as the Vajradhvaja-pariṇāmanā) and the Ratnolkādhāraṇī (The Dhāraṇī of the Jewel Torch) seem to have been important sutras in India. The Vajradhvaja sūtra is cited five times by Shantideva in his Śikṣāsamuccaya and it is one of the few texts explicitly recommended in his Bodhisatvacaryāvatāra (chapter 7, verse 46). It is Chapter 30 in the Tibetan Avatamsaka. Two manuscripts of an independent Vajradhvaja are preserved in the Dunhuang texts.

Meanwhile, the Ratnolkādhāraṇī is also widely cited by Shantideva (four times in the Śikṣāsamuccaya). The relationship between the Ratnolkādhāraṇī and the Buddhāvataṃsaka is complex. Parts of the Ratnolkādhāraṇī can be found in different chapters of the Buddhāvataṃsaka (in the Tibetan Avatamsaka's chapter 17 and in chapter 20). The Ratnolkādhāraṇī also exists as independent Tibetan and Chinese sutras.

== English translations ==
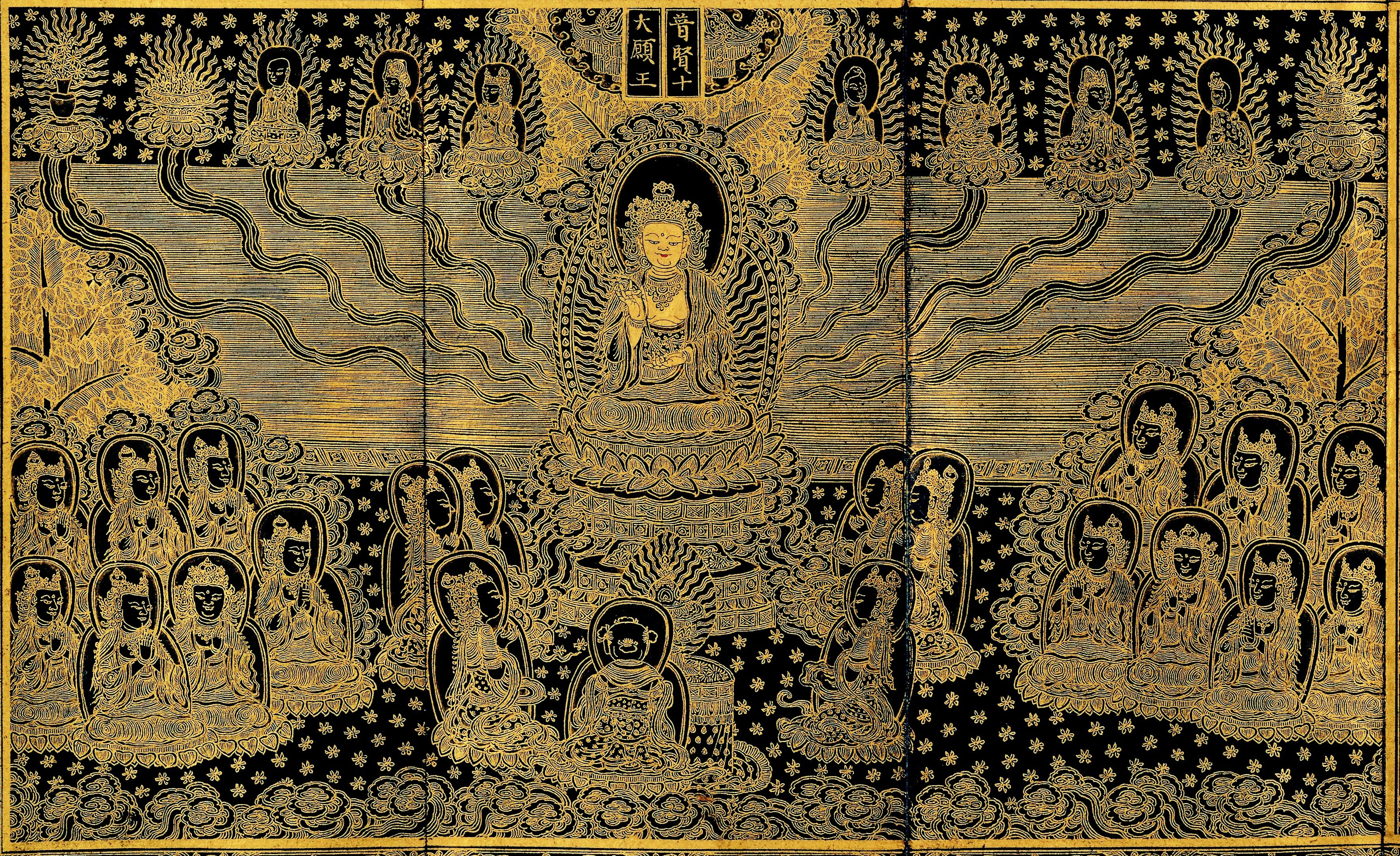
Korean illustrated Avatamsaka, Goryeo Dynasty

The first relatively complete English translation of the contents of the Buddhāvataṃsakasūtra was authored by the late Thomas Cleary and published by Shambhala Publications in 1984 as The Flower Ornament Scripture: A Translation of the Avatamsaka Sūtra. Cleary's translation was actually only partially translated from Śikṣānanda's most complete and now standard Tang Dynasty edition. Cleary chose instead to translate fully a third of this scripture (the very long and detailed Chapter 26 and the immense 53-part Chapter 39) from the much later P.L. Vaidya Sanskrit editions, even though he claimed on page two of his introduction to have made his translation from the Śikṣānanda edition. This is clearly not true, for Cleary's translations of Chapters 26 and 39 do not follow Śikṣānanda's Chinese at all, whereas they do follow the often very different P.L. Vaidya Sanskrit edition fairly closely from beginning to end.

Bhiksu Dharmamitra has recently produced from Tripitaka Master Śikṣānanda's 699 ce Sanskrit-to-Chinese edition (T0279) the first and so far only complete English translation of any edition of the Buddhāvataṃsakasūtra. It is published by Kalavinka Press in three volumes (totaling 2,500 pages) as The Flower Adornment Sutra: An Annotated Translation of the Avataṃsaka Sutra with A Commentarial Synopsis of the Flower Adornment Sutra (October 1, 2022 / ISBNS: Volume One - 9781935413356; Volume Two - 9781935413363; Volume Three - 9781935413370). (His complete translation of Chapter 39 which corresponds precisely to the Gaṇḍavyūha is contained in Volume Three of this work. It includes the traditionally appended conclusion to Chapter 39, "The Conduct and Vows of Samantabhadra" which was originally translated into Chinese in 798 ce by Tripitaka Master Prajñā).

The publisher Bukkyo Dendo Kyokai (BDK) has finished editing and is currently (as of July, 2022) in the process of preparing for publication an unannotated multi-volume edition of Bhikshu Dharmamitra's Flower Adornment Sutra which also includes Bhikshu Dharmamitra's translation of the traditionally appended conclusion to Chapter 39, "The Conduct and Vows of Samantabhadra" originally translated by Tripitaka Master Prajñā.

Both the Gaṇḍavyūha and the Daśabhūmika (which together constitute approximately one third of the Avataṃsaka Sūtra) have been independently translated from the Tibetan version by Peter Alan Roberts along with 84000.co as:

- The Ten Bhūmis Chapter from the Mahāvaipulya Sūtra "A Multitude of Buddhas"
- "The Stem Array" Chapter from the Mahāvaipulya Sūtra "A Multitude of Buddhas"

These translations are freely available on the 84000 website.

The City of Ten Thousand Buddhas is also producing a translation of the Avataṃsaka Sūtra (which they title The Great Means Expansive Buddha Flower Adornment Sutra) along with a lengthy commentary by Venerable Hsuan Hua. Currently over twenty volumes are available, and it is estimated that there may be 75-100 volumes in the complete edition.

== See also ==
- Indra's net
- List of sutras
- Mahayana sutras
- Shin'yaku Kegonkyō Ongi Shiki, an early Japanese annotation
- Huayan school, Chinese Buddhist tradition named after this sutra
- Kegon school, Japanese Huayan
- Multiverse
