= Hundok =

Korean vernacular reading of Chinese characters

- Hangul: 훈독
- Hanja: 訓讀
- RR: hundok
- MR: hundok

Hundok (Korean: 훈독; Hanja: 訓讀), or Korean vernacular reading, broadly refers to reading Chinese characters as native Korean words corresponding to their meanings rather than with their Sino-Korean pronunciations. It occurs chiefly in systems that used Chinese characters to write Korean before the creation of Hangul, including hyangchal and idu. It is also associated with the interpretive-reading form of gugyeol, which renders Literary Sinitic in Korean word order and grammar.

In modern South Korean Hanja education, each character is still assigned a Korean semantic gloss called a hun (훈) or saegim (새김), but ordinary Hanja text is generally read with Sino-Korean pronunciations. Modern pedagogical labels called huneum (훈음; "gloss and sound") serve a different purpose from the native-word readings used in historical borrowed-character texts.

== Borrowed-character writing ==
Before Hangul, Korean was recorded partly through chaja (차자), the borrowing of Chinese graphs. One analysis used in Korean philology classifies a borrowed graph along two axes: whether its Chinese-derived sound or its Korean gloss was used, and whether the graph retained its semantic function. Their intersection produces four categories: sound-reading (음독), sound-borrowing (음가), gloss-reading (훈독), and gloss-borrowing (훈가).

A hundokja (훈독자; 訓讀字) retains the meaning of the graph and is read as the corresponding Korean word. A hungaja (훈가자; 訓假字), by contrast, borrows the sound of a graph's Korean gloss without retaining the graph's original meaning. Semantic-reading graphs often represent lexical words such as nouns, verbs, and adjectives, while phonographic graphs frequently represent endings, particles, or the final sound of a lexical word. The pronunciation intended by a semantic graph cannot always be recovered from the graph alone. Writers sometimes added another borrowed graph to indicate the final consonant or syllable of the Korean word, a convention known as mareum cheomgi (말음첨기; 末音添記). In 夜音, for example, 夜 supplies the meaning "night" and is read as 밤 (bam), while 音 indicates the final ㅁ.

=== Examples ===
The following forms are cited in analyses of hyangchal material. They include Middle Korean forms and scholarly reconstructions based partly on final-sound notation rather than the ordinary readings of the corresponding characters in modern Korean prose.

Written form	Vernacular reading or gloss	Meaning or explanation
春	봄 (bom)	spring
夜音	밤 (bam)	night; 音 indicates final ㅁ
道尸	길 (gil)	road or path; 尸 indicates final ㄹ
憂音	시름 (sireum)	worry or sorrow; 音 participates in final-sound notation
母牛	암쇼 (amsyo)	cow; modern Korean 암소 (amso)
岩乎	바회 (bahoe)	rock; modern Korean 바위 (bawi)

== Writing and reading traditions ==
Hyangchal used Chinese graphs to record complete Korean sentences. It generally combined semantically used reading graphs with phonographically used borrowing graphs for grammatical elements and the ends of words. Most surviving examples occur in the notation of hyangga, vernacular poems from the Silla and early Goryeo periods.

Idu likewise combined Sinitic elements with Korean grammatical elements and was used especially in administrative and other practical writing. Gugyeol added symbols or borrowed graphs to a Literary Sinitic text to guide its interpretation in Korean. Seokdok gugyeol (석독구결; 釋讀口訣, "interpretive-reading gugyeol") rearranged and supplemented a text so that it could be understood in a form approaching a complete Korean sentence. Sundok gugyeol (순독구결; 順讀口訣, "sequential-reading gugyeol") largely followed the original Sinitic order and pronunciation while inserting Korean function words.

After the creation of Hangul in the fifteenth century, the need to write entire Korean sentences through borrowed Chinese graphs declined. Borrowed-character systems were gradually displaced by Hangul, although some uses of idu and gugyeol continued into later periods.

== Huneum in modern Hanja education ==
Modern South Korean dictionaries, textbooks, and Hanja proficiency tests often identify a character with a semantic gloss followed by its Sino-Korean reading, jointly called its huneum. The Hanja Proficiency Test administered by the Korean Association for Hanja Education Promotion lists recognition of huneum alongside reading and writing among the skills tested at successive levels. A South Korean high-school textbook gives examples such as the following:

Hanja	Hun (semantic gloss)	Eum (Sino-Korean reading)	Full label
水	물 ("water")	수 (su)	물 수 (mul su)
家	집 ("house")	가 (ga)	집 가 (jip ga)
國	나라 ("country")	국 (guk)	나라 국 (nara guk)

The hun, also called a character gloss (자훈) or representative gloss (대표훈), links a graph to a Korean word that cues its meaning. Researchers have noted that a single standardized gloss cannot necessarily cover all of a character's meanings across different words and contexts, creating pedagogical problems when learners use it to interpret Sino-Korean vocabulary.

In a label such as 물 수, 물 is normally a cue to the character's meaning, while 수 is its pronunciation in ordinary Hanja text and Sino-Korean vocabulary. Modern huneum uses the traditional concept of a gloss for lexicography and teaching, but differs from historical hundokja that were actually read as native Korean words.

== Comparison with Japanese kun readings ==
In Japanese terminology, text-level vernacular reading of Literary Sinitic is called kundoku, whereas native Japanese readings assigned to individual kanji are called kun'yomi. Japanese kun'yomi are used in everyday reading and writing alongside on'yomi, the Chinese-derived readings of kanji. Japan's official List of jōyō kanji specifies principal on and kun readings for commonly used characters.

In historical Korean borrowed-character writing, some characters were read as the corresponding native Korean words. In Sino-Korean vocabulary and Literary Sinitic, characters are generally read with their Sino-Korean pronunciations. The native Korean hun listed in modern dictionaries and Hanja teaching materials explains a character's meaning rather than indicating how it is pronounced in running text.

== See also ==
- Hanja
- Sino-Korean vocabulary
- Hyangch'al
- Idu script
- Gugyeol
- Kanbun
