= Korean mixed script =

Writing using Hangul and Hanja

- Script type: Alternative – uses both logographic (Hanja) and alphabetic (Hangul) characters
- Period: 1443 CE – present
- Direction: Up-to-down, right-to-left (historical); Left-to-right (modern)
- Languages: Korean language

ISO 15924
- ISO 15924: Kore (287), Korean (alias for Hangul + Han)

Unicode

Korean name
- Hangul: 국한문 혼용
- Hanja: 國漢文混用
- RR: gukhanmun honyong
- MR: kukhanmun honyong

National Sinic mixed script
- Hangul: 한자 혼용
- Hanja: 漢字混用
- RR: hanja honyong
- MR: hancha honyong

Korean mixed script (Korean: 국한문 혼용체; Hanja: 國漢文混用體) is a form of writing the Korean language that uses a mixture of the Korean alphabet or hangul (한글) and hanja (漢字, 한자), the Korean name for Chinese characters. The distribution on how to write words usually follows that all native Korean words, including suffixes, particles, and honorific markers are generally written in hangul and never in hanja. Sino-Korean vocabulary or hanja-eo (한자어; 漢字語), either words borrowed from Chinese or created from Sino-Korean roots, were generally always written in hanja, although very rare or complex characters were often substituted with hangul. Although the Korean alphabet was introduced and taught to people beginning in 1446, most literature until the early twentieth century was written in literary Chinese known as hanmun (한문; 漢文).

Although examples of mixed-script writing are as old as hangul itself, the mixing of hangul and hanja together in sentences became the official writing system of the Korean language at the end of the nineteenth century, when reforms ended the primacy of literary Chinese in literature, science, and government. This style of writing, in competition with hangul-only writing, continued as the formal written version of Korean for most of the twentieth century. The script slowly gave way to hangul-only usage in North Korea by 1949, while it continued in South Korea to a limited extent. However, with the decrease in hanja education, the number of hanja in use has slowly dwindled, and in the twenty-first century, very few hanja are used at all. In Yanbian Korean Autonomous Prefecture in China, local newspaper Northeast Korean People's Daily published the "workers and peasants version" which used all-hangul in text, in addition to the existing "cadre version" that had mixed script, for the convenience of grassroots Korean people. Starting on April 20, 1952, the newspaper abolished the "cadre version" and published in hangul only. Soon, the entire publishing industry adopted the hangul-only style.

== History and development ==
The development of hanja-honyong required two major developments in orthographic traditions of the Korean Peninsula. The first was the adoption of hanja, around the beginning of the Three Kingdom period of Korea. The second was the introduction of hangul in 1446.

=== Promulgation of Hunminjeongeum ===
==== Introduction ====
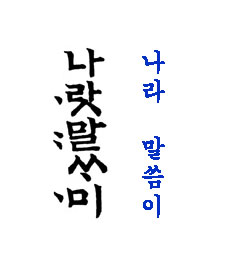
Example of hangul written in the traditional vertical manner. On the left is the original text in Hunminjeongeum Haerye and on the right is modern orthography.

Despite the advent of vernacular writing in Korean using hanja, these publications remained the dominion of the literate class, comprising royalty and nobility, Buddhist monks, Confucian scholars, civil servants and members of the upper classes as the ability to read these texts required proficient ability to understand the meaning of the Chinese characters, with both their adopted Sino-Korean pronunciation and their native gloss. To rectify this, King Sejong the Great (조선 세종대왕; 朝鮮 世宗大王) summoned a team of scholars to devise a new script for the Korean language, leading to the 1446 promulgation of the Hunminjeongeum (훈민정음; 訓民正音, 'correct pronunciation for teaching the people') which is later critiqued in Hunminjeongeum Haerye. The problems surrounding literacy in Literary Chinese to the common populace was summarized in the Sejong's preface, written in Literary Chinese:

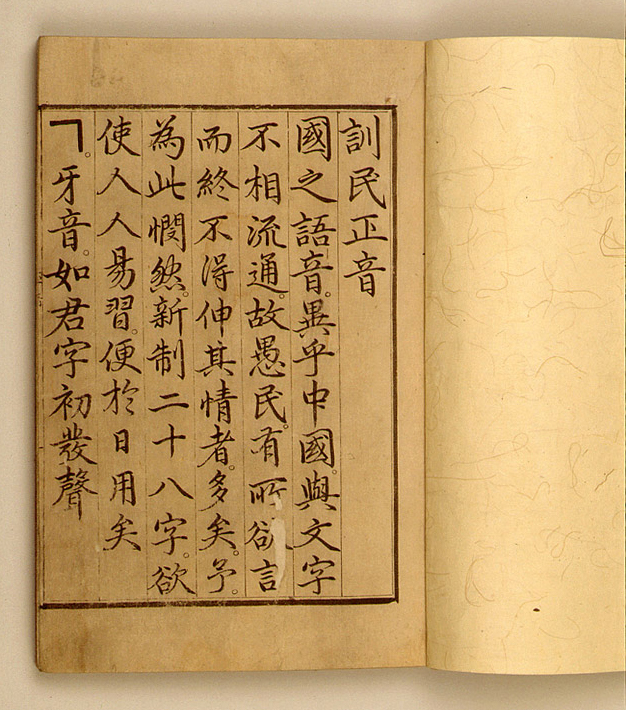
The opening page of Hunminjeongeum Haeryebon written in Literary Chinese, reading from top to bottom and right to left. The second to fifth columns are transcribed in this article. The final column depicts the letter ㄱ, and that its sound is the initial of the Sino-Korean pronunciation of 君 (Korean: 군; RR: gun; MR: kun).

國之語音。異乎中國。與文字不相流通。故愚民。有所欲言而終不得伸其情者。多矣。予。爲此憫然。新制二十八字。欲使人人易習。便於日用矣。 (Note: In this last line, some digital transcriptions including the one by the Academy of Korean Studies replaces 矣 with 耳.)
[Because] the spoken language of this country is different from that of China, it does not flow well with [Chinese] characters. Therefore, even if the ignorant want to communicate, many of them in the end cannot state their concerns. Saddened by this, I have [had] 28 letters newly made. It is my wish that all the people may easily learn these letters and that [they] be convenient for daily use.

==== Spread ====
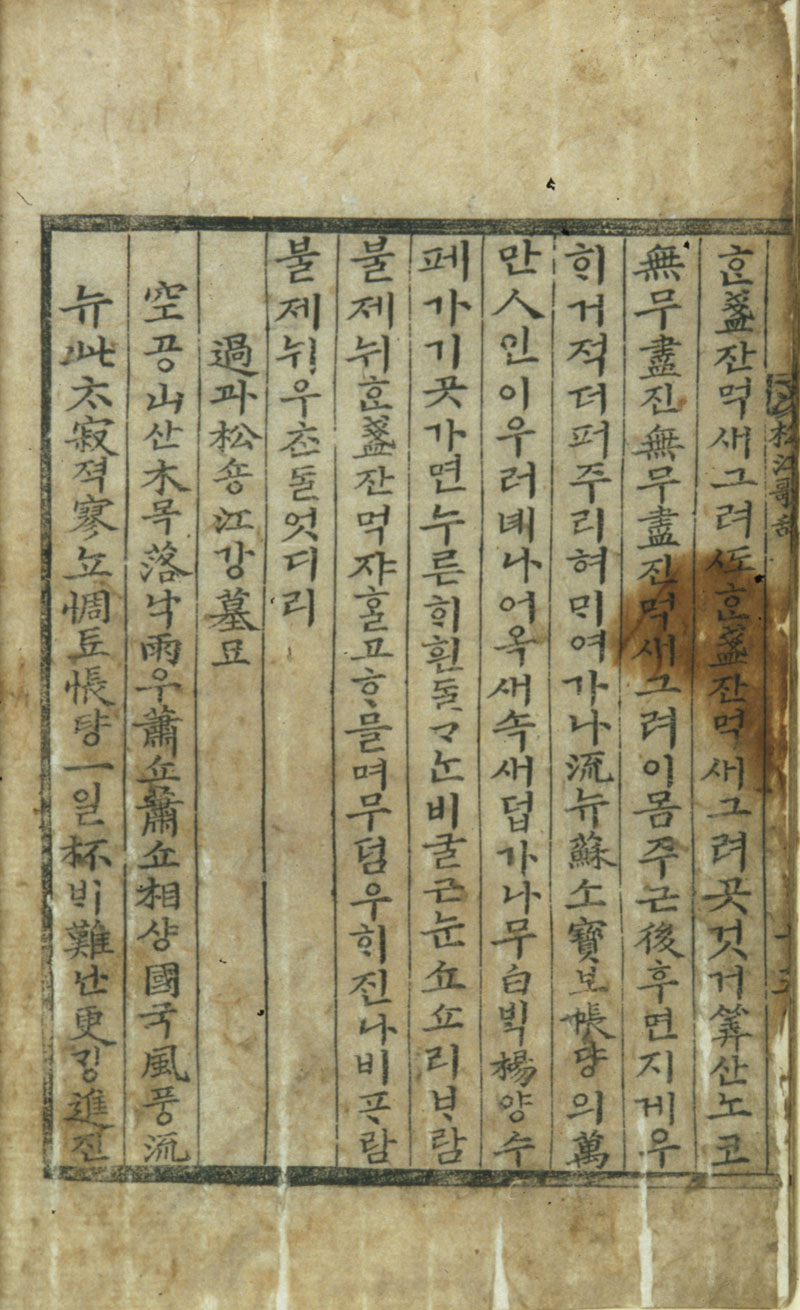
Songangasa, a collection of poems in mixed script by Jeong Cheol, printed in 1768

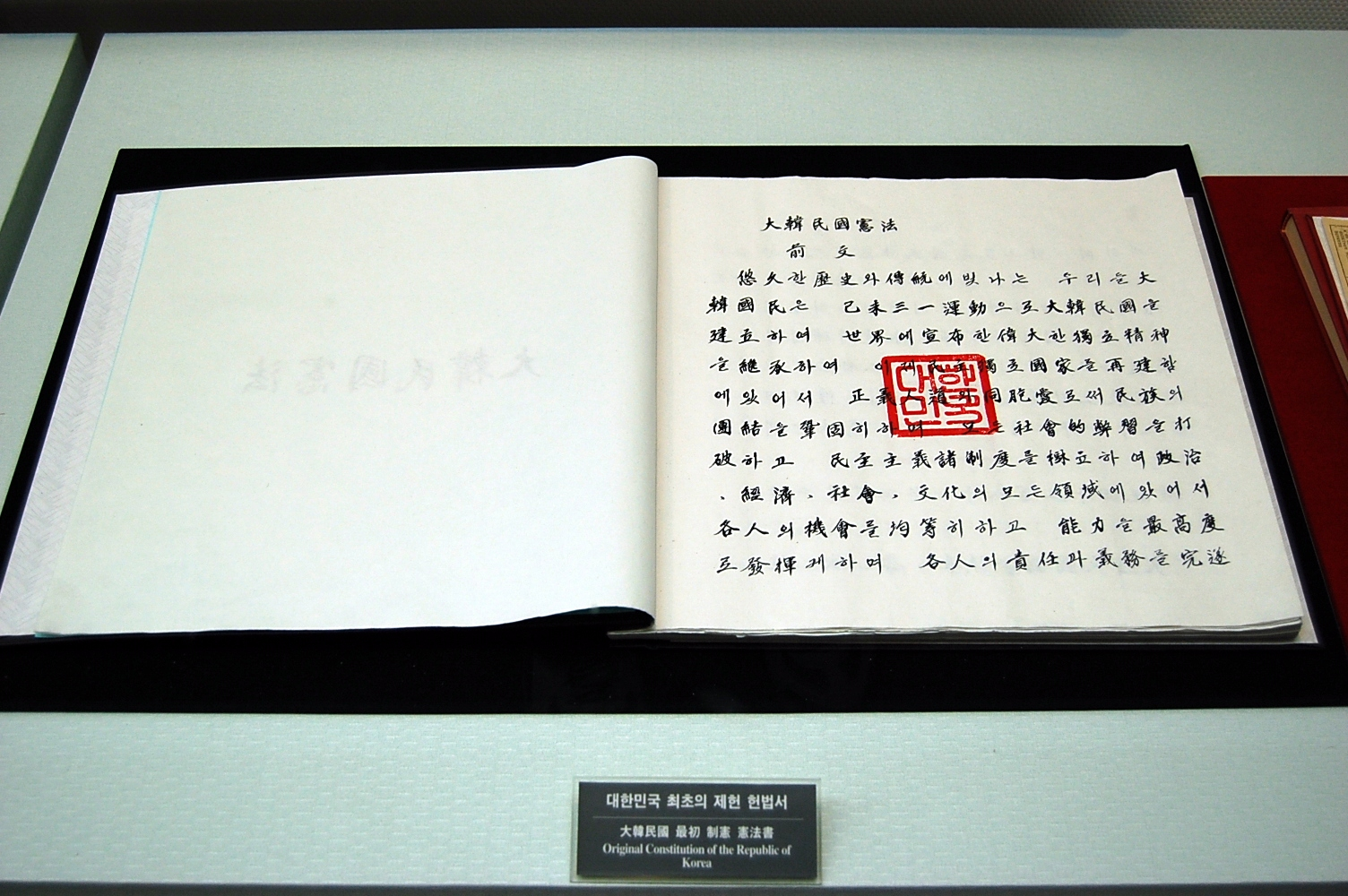
Preamble of the first version of the Constitution of South Korea written in mixed script

The new script rapidly spread to all parts of society, including the segments of the population formerly denied access to education such as farmers, fishermen, women of the lower classes, rural merchants and young children. It was known as vernacular script, (Korean: 언문; Hanja: 諺文; RR: eonmun, and 언문청; 諺文廳; eonmuncheong), or national script (국문; 國文; gukmun), by the state. Several attempts to ban or over-turn the use of hangul were initiated but failed to halt its spread, the most notable being during the 10th year of the tyrannical reign of prince Yeonsan, where he banned the use, learning, and teaching of Hangul on 19 July 1504 after the public mocked and insulted him in posters; the total ban ended five months later in December of the same year, when he ordered the translation of calendar-books (역서; 曆書; yeokseo) into Hangul. These attempts were initiated by several rulers, who discovered disparaging remarks about their reigns, and the upper classes, whose grip on power and influence was predicated upon their ability to read, write and interpret classical Chinese texts and commentaries thereof. Some scholarly elite mocked the sole use of hangul pseudo-deferentially as jinseo (진서; 真書), 'real script'. Other insults such as 'women's script', 'children's script' and 'farmer's hand' are known anecdotally but are not found in the literature.

Despite the fears from the upper classes and scholarly elite, the introduction of the early hangul actually increased proficiency in literary Chinese. New-style hanja dictionaries appeared, arranging words according to their alphabetic order when spelled out in hangul, and showing compound words containing the hanja as well as its Sino-Korean and its native, sometimes archaic, pronunciation — a system still in use for many contemporary Korean-language hanja dictionaries. The syllable blocks could be written easily between meaningful units of Chinese characters, as annotations, but also began to replace the complex notation of the early gugyeol and idu, including hyangchal, although gugyeol and idu were not officially abolished until the end of the 19th century in part because literary Chinese was still the official written language of the royal court, nobility, governance and diplomacy until its usage was finally abolished in the early twentieth century and its local production mostly ceased by mid-century.

The real spread of hangul to all elements of Korean society was the late eighteenth century beginning of two literary trends. The ancient sijo (시조; 時調), 'seasonal tune', poetry. Although sijo, heavily influenced by Chinese Tang dynasty poetry, was long written in Chinese, authors began writing poems in Korean written solely with hangul, previously only possible with gugyeol and idu. At the same time, gasa (가사; 歌詞), 'song lyric', poetry was similarly spread. Korean women of the upper classes created gasa by translating or finding inspiration in the old poems, written in literary Chinese, and translating them into Korean, but as the name suggests, were popularly sung. Although Catholic and Protestant missionaries initially attempted to evangelise the Korean Peninsula starting with the nobility using Chinese translations and works, in the early nineteenth century, Bishop Siméon-François Berneux, or Jang Gyeong-il (장경일; 張敬一) mandated that all publications be written only in hangul and all students in the missionary schools were required to use it. Protestant and other Catholic missionaries followed suit, facilitating the spread of Christianity in Korea, but also created a large corpus of Korean-language material written in hangul only.

The script is now the primary and most commonplace method to write the Korean language, and is known as hangul (한글) in South Korea, from han (한; 韓), as in 'Korea', and gul (글), 'script'. In North Korea, the script is known as joseongul (조선글; 朝鮮글). The promulgation of the indigenous script is celebrated as a national holiday on 9 October in the south and 15 January in the north, respectively.

=== Mixed script or Hanja-honyong ===
The lyrics to the National anthem of the Korean Empire in Korean mixed script. The smaller hangul after each hanja group would normally be unwritten, but are presented to indicate the pronunciation of the Sino-Korean elements.

The practice of mixing hangul into hanja began as early as the introduction of hangul. Even King Sejong's promulgation proclamation was written in literary Chinese and idu passages to explain the alphabet and mixed passages that help 'ease' the reader into the use of the alphabet. The first novel written in hangul, Yongbieocheonga (용비어천가; 龍飛御天歌, Songs of the Dragons Flying to Heaven) is actually mostly written in what would now be considered mixed-script writing. Another major literary work touted as a masterpiece of hangul-based literature, the 1590 translation of The Analects of Confucius (논어; 論語) by Yi Yulgok (이율곡; 李栗谷) is also written entirely in hanja-honyong.

Many Koreans today attribute hanja-honyong to the Japanese occupation of Korea. This is in part due to the visual similarity of Chinese characters interspersed with alphabetic text of Japanese-language texts to Korean-language texts in mixed script, and the numerous assimilation and suppression schemes of the occupational government carried out against the Korean people, language and culture. In fact, hanja-honyong was commonplace amongst the royalty, yangban (양반; 兩班) and jung-in classes for personal records and informal letters shortly after the introduction of the alphabet, and replaced the routine use of idu by the jung-in. The heyday of hanja-honyong arrived with the Gap-o reforms (갑오; 甲午) passed in 1894–1896 after the Donghak Peasant Rebellion (동학농민혁명; 東學農民革命). The reforms ended the client status of Korea to the Qing dynasty emperors, elevating King Gojong to Emperor Gwangmu (고종 광무제; 高宗 光武帝), ended the supremacy of literary Chinese and idu script, ended the gwageo imperial examinations. In place of literary Chinese, the Korean language written in the 'national letters' (국문; 國文)—now understood as an alternate name for hangul but at the time referred to hanja-honyong—was now the language of governance.

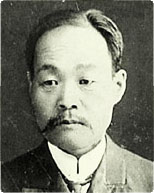
Yu Giljun (유길준; 兪吉濬), author of the hanja-honyong publication Seoyu Gyeonmun (서유견문; 西遊見聞) or Observations on Travels to the West

Due to over a thousand years of literary Chinese supremacy, the early hanja-honyong texts were written in a stiff, prosaic style, with a preponderance of Sino-Korean terms barely removed from gugyeol, but the written language was quickly adapted into the current format with a more natural style, using hanja only where a Sino-Korean loan word was read in Sino-Korean pronunciation and hangul for native words and grammatical particles. One of the most important publications at the end of the Joseon period was the weekly newspaper, Hanseong Jugang (한성주간; 漢城週刊), one of the first written in the more natural style several years before the Gap-o reforms. The popular newspaper was originally started as a hanja-only publication that lasted only a few weeks before they switched formats. During the reforms, Yu Giljun (유길준; 兪吉濬) published his travel diaries, Seoyu Gyeonmun (서유견문; 西遊見聞) or Observations on Travels to the West was a best-seller at this time. The success of Hanseong Jugang and Seoyu Gyeonmun urged the literati to switch to vernacular Korean in hanja-honyong.

=== Decline of mixed script ===
Mixed script was a commonly used means of writing, although hangul exclusive writing has been used concurrently, in Korea after the decline of literary Chinese, known as hanmun (한문; 漢文). Mixed script could be commonly found in non-fiction writing, newspapers, etc. until the enacting of President Park Chung-hee's 5-Year Plan for Hangul Exclusivity (Korean: 한글전용 5개년 계획안; Hanja: 한글專用 5個年 計劃案; RR: Hangeul Jeonyong Ogaenyeon Gyehoegan) in 1968 banned the use and teaching of hanja in public schools, as well as forbade its use in the military, with the goal of eliminating hanja in writing by 1972 through legislative and executive means. However, due to public backlash in 1972, Park's government allowed for the teaching of Hanja in special classes but maintained a ban on hanja use in textbooks and other learning materials outside of the classes. This reverse step however, was optional so the availability of hanja education was dependent on the school one went to.

Another reason for the decline is found in the Hangul typewriter and keyboard. The push for better Hangul typewriters mainly began in 1949, but as it was way before the hanja ban, government institutions did not prefer typewriters altogether as they could not write in hanja nor mixed script. Kong Byung Wo's notable Sebeolsik type first appeared in March 1949, jointly winning second place in the Joseon balmyong jangryohoe's (조선발명장려회) Hangul type contest, and Kim Dong Hoon's typewriter winning joint 3rd. During the 1950s and 1960s, alongside the Korean government's support for typewriting, new Hangul typewriters were developed, distributed, and adopted. Hangul type with both horizontal writing and Moa-sugi (모아쓰기; the style of Hangul where Hangul consonants and vowels mix in together to form a full letter, which is the default style being used today) first appeared in the same period as government policy. With further adoption, during the 1970s, even when hanja and mixed script were still used widely in society both as a writing system and as a style option, Koreans mostly gave up on mixed script at least in government documents and memoranda; The use of Hanja in type hindered the speed of writing and printing compared to only-Hangul usage, especially after the advent of the Sebeolsik layout (세벌식 자판)

Park's Hanja ban was not formally lifted until 1992 under the government of Kim Young-sam. In 1999, the government of Kim Dae-jung actively promoted Hanja by placing it on signs on the road, at bus stops, and in subways. In 1999, Hanja was reintroduced as a school elective and in 2001 the Hanja Proficiency Test (한자능력검정시험; 漢字能力檢定試驗; Hanja nŭngryŏk gŏmjŏng sihŏm) was introduced. In 2005, an older law, the Law Concerning Hangul Exclusivity (한글전용에 관한 법률; 한글專用에 關한 法律; hangŭl jŏnyonge gwahak pŏmnyul) was repealed as well. In 2013, all elementary schools in Seoul started teaching Hanja. However, the result was that Koreans who were educated in this period, having never been formally educated in Hanja, were unable to use them and thus the use of Hanja plummeted in orthography until the modern day. Hanja is now very rarely used and is almost only used for abbreviations in newspaper headlines (e.g. 中 for China, 韓 for Korea, 美 for the United States, 日 for Japan, etc.), for clarification in text where a word might be confused for another due to homophones (e.g. 이 사장(李 社長) vs. 이사장(理事長)), or for stylistic use such as the 辛 (신라면; 辛拉麵) used on Shin Ramyŏn packaging.

== Structure ==
In typical mixed script texts, traditionally all words that were of Sino-Korean origin, either composed from Chinese character compounds natively or loan words directly from Chinese, were written in hanja although particularly rare or complicated hanja were often disambiguated with the hangul pronunciation and perhaps a gloss of the meaning. Native words, including Korean grammatical postpositions, were written in hangul. Due to the reforms at the close of the Joseon dynasty, native words were not supposed to be written in hanja, as they were in the idu and hyangchal systems which were abolished at this time.

== Visual processing ==
In Korean mixed-script writing, especially in formal and academic contexts, the majority of semantic or 'content' words are generally written in hanja whereas most syntax or 'function' is conveyed with grammatical endings, particles and honorifics written in hangul. Japanese, which continues to use a heavily Chinese character-laden orthography, is read in the same way. The Chinese characters, have different angled strokes and oftentimes more strokes than a typical syllable block of hangul letters, and definitely more so than Japanese kana, enabling readers of both respective languages to process content information very quickly.

Korean readers, however, have a few more handicaps than Japanese readers. For instance, although academic, legal, scientific, history and literature have a higher proportion of Sino-Korean vocabulary, Korean has more indigenous vocabulary used for semantic information, so older Korean readers often scan the hanja first and then piece together by reading the hangul content words to piece the meaning. Japanese avoids this problem by writing most content words with their Sino-Japanese equivalent of kanji, whereas reading Sino-Korean vocabulary according to their native Korean pronunciation or translation was banned in previous reforms, so only a Sino-Korean word can be written in hanja. The handicaps are avoided by the adoption of spaces inserted between phrases in modern Korean, limiting phrases, generally, to a content word and grammatical particle(s), allowing readers to spot the native Korean content words faster.

In reading texts, Koreans are faster at reading out passages written in hangul than in mixed script. However, although 'reading' is faster, understanding the texts is facilitated with the use of hanja in higher order language to the large number of homophones in the language, such as the continued role of 'hanja disambiguation' even in hangul-only texts. For instance, daehan (대한), usually understood in the context of the 'Great Han' (大韓, 대한) or 'Great Korean people,' can also indicate (大寒,대한) 'big winter,' the coldest part at the end of January and beginning of February, (大旱, 대한) 'severe drought,' (大漢, 대한) 'Great Chinese people,' (大恨, 대한) 'deep resentment,' (對韓, 대한) 'anti-Korean,' (對漢, 대한), 'anti-Chinese,' or (對한) 'about or 'toward.' Readers of technical and academic texts often have to clarify terms for the listener to avoid ambiguity, and most hanja are only used when necessary to clear confusion. As can be seen in the example below, the hanja in an otherwise mostly native vocabulary song stand out from the hangul text, thus appearing almost like bolded and enlarged text. This was further amplified in older texts, when hangul blocks were sometimes written smaller than the surrounding hanja.

First and Third Refrain from Seoul version of the Korean epic song Arirang (아리랑)
First Refrain	Mixed script	나를	버리고	가시는	임은	**十里**도	못가서	발**病**난다	
First Refrain	Hangul only	나를	버리고	가시는	임은	십리도	못가서	발병난다	
First Refrain	English	'I-[object]'	'to abandon-[serial sentence connector]'	'to go'-[topic]	'you-[topic]'	'ten li (distance)-[additive]'	'to be able to go-[primary conjunctive]'	'to have sore feet-[conjunctive/gerund]'	
First Refrain	Translation	My love, you are leaving me. Your feet will be **SORE** before you go **TEN LI**. 'You are going to abandon me and will not be able to go ten li [before] having sore feet.'							
Third Refrain	Mixed script	저기	저	**山**이	**白頭山**이라지	**冬至**	섣달에도	꽃만	핀다
Third Refrain	Hangul only	저기	저	산이	백두산이라지	동지	섣달에도	꽃만	핀다
Third Refrain	English	'that-[nominal clause]'	'that'	'mountain-[nominative]'	'Baekdu Mountain-[plain declarative]-[nominative]-[casual declarative]'	'winter solstice'	'twelfth month-despite-[additive]'	'to bloom'	'to blossom'
Third Refrain	Translation	There, over there, that **MOUNTAIN** is **BAEKDU MOUNTAIN**, where, even in the middle of **WINTER DAYS**, flowers bloom. 'That one, that is Baekdu Mountain, surely. Despite the [middle of] winter [around the time of the] winter solstice, flowers bloom.'							

== Hanja disambiguation ==
Very few hanja are used in modern Korean writing, but are occasionally seen in academic and technical texts and formal publications, such as newspapers, where the rare hanja is used as a shorthand in newspaper headlines, especially if the native Korean equivalent is a longer word, or more importantly, to disambiguate the meaning of a word. Sino-Korean words make up over 70% of the Korean language, although only a third of them are in common usage, but that proportion increases in formal and highbrow publications. A native Korean syllable may have up to 1,300 possible combinations compared to the Sino-Korean inventory of 400. Although Middle Korean developed tones that may have facilitated differentiation of words, this development was lost in the transition to modern Korean, making many words homophones of each other. Cantonese, whose pronunciation of the characters is similar to the Sino-Korean pronunciation due to its conservative phonology and the ancient age in which these words entered Korean, has several words pronounced /san/: 新 'new', 身 'body', 神 'deity', 辛 'difficult' or 'spicy', 蜃 'large clam', 腎 'kidney' and 呻 'to lament.' Although even in Cantonese 新, 身 and 辛 are true homophones with the pronunciation of /sân/ with the high tone, each of the other examples is pronounced with a unique tone that distiniguish them from the first three and each other: 蜃 /sa̜n/, 腎 /sàn/ and 呻 /sān/. In Korean, the hanja-eo reading of all these characters is /sin/ and in hangul spelling all share 신 and no tone to distinguish them.

By the mid-1990s, when even the most conservative newspapers stopped publishing in hanja-honyong, with most ceasing in the 1980s, and switched to a generally all-hangul format, the use of characters to clarify the meaning of a word, 'hanja disambiguation', is still common, in part due to complaints from older subscribers that were educated in the mixed script and were used to using hanja glosses. From this 2018 article from the conservative newspaper The Chosun Ilbo, two phrases are disambiguated with hanja:

- 정점은 2003~04시즌 무패(無敗) 리그 우승이라는 위업을 이룬 것이었다
  아직도 당시의 무패 우승은 회자(膾炙)되고 있다 (hangul with hanja disambiguation)
- 頂點은 2003~04시즌 無敗(무패) 리그 優勝이라는 偉業을 이룬 것이었다
  아직도 當時의 無敗 優勝은 膾炙(회자)되고 있다 (hanja with hangul phonetic annotation)
- "The pinnacle years of the 2003–2004 season was a championship victory for the undefeated league. The undefeated championship of that period is still 'roast meat' (praised)."

Although in many instances, context can help discern the meaning, and many of the possible variants are obscure or rare characters that would be encountered only in either classical literature or literary Chinese thus limiting choices. In more relaxed publications, where hanja disambiguation is less common, Sino-Korean terms are avoided as much as possible, although this may appear as "dumbed down" material to some readers. Context can often facilitate the meaning of many terms. Many Sino-Korean terms that are rare and only encountered in ancient texts in literary Chinese are almost unknown and would not even be part of the hanja taught in education, limiting the number of likely choices.

Sino-Korean (漢字語, 한자어, hanja-eo) homophones
신지 sinji	종고 jonggo	선공 seon-gong	가기 gagi	국 guk	광 gwang
信地: patrol zone	鐘鼓: bell and drum	先攻: first strike	佳期: good season; nuptial consummation	局: bureau; administration	光: light (as in illumination)
宸旨: minister	宗高: noble ancestry	扇工: hand fan laborer	可期: expectation; to pledge	國: country; nation; region	廣: breadth
信之: truthfulness	終古: ancient times	船工: shipmate	佳氣: noble aura	菊: chrysanthemum	鑛: mine (as in an excavation where ores and minerals are found)
愼之: caution; fearfulness	從姑: paternal cousin	善恐: throat disease	家妓: housemaid	鞠: to bend; to curve; to bow; leather ball	狂: madness
臣指: official; court minister	從古: previous times	善功: virtuous success	家忌: death anniversary	鵴: cuckoo	匡: rectify
新地: reclaimed land			哥器: Ge ware	椈: cypress	壙: tomb
新枝: spring growth; new branches			稼器: farm implements	麯: malt	胱: bladder
新知: new knowledge				攫: grasp	筐: basket made of bamboo
神地: tutelary deity

== Examples ==
Korean in hanja-honyong and hangul
Hanja-honyong (top), Hangul (middle) and Romaja (last)	English
失業者가 繼續 늘어나서 政府는 對策을 磨鍊하고 있다. 실업자가 계속 늘어나서 정부는 대책을 마련하고 있다. Sireopjaga gyesok neureonaseo jeongbuneun daechaegeul maryeonhago itda.	As the number of unemployed continues to rise, the government is planning improvements.
大韓民國 農業이 더 發展할 수 있도록 도와주는 硏究 結果가 公開되었다. 대한민국 농업이 더 발전할 수 있도록 도와주는 연구 결과가 공개되었다. {Daehan Minguk} nong-eobi deo baljeonhal su itdorok dowajuneun yeongu gyeolgwaga gonggaedoe-eotda.	The research results that may improve Korean agriculture are now public.
朝鮮日報는 1920年에 創刊되었다. 100年이 다 되어 간다. 조선일보는 1920년에 창간되었다. 100년이 다 되어 간다. {Joseon Ilboneun} 1920(cheongubaegisim)nyeone changgandoe-eotda 100(baeng)nyeoni da doe-eo ganda.	Chosun Ilbo was first published in 1920. Almost 100 years have been passed since then.
休暇 中 心肺 蘇生術로 사람을 살린 兵士가 話題가 되고 있다. 휴가 중 심폐 소생술로 사람을 살린 병사가 화제가 되고 있다. Hyuga jung simpye sosaengsullo sarameul sallin byeongsaga hwajega doego itda.	The soldier who revived an elderly person with CPR while on vacation became a headline.
인터넷 豫買가 電話 豫買보다 便하더라. 인터넷 예매가 전화 예매보다 편하더라. Inteonet yemaega jeonhwa yemaeboda pyeonhadeora.	Internet reservations are more convenient than telephone reservations.
어제 日出은 5:10, 日沒은 19:53이었다. 어제 일출은 5:10, 일몰은 19:53이었다. Eoje ilchureun {5:10(daseot-si sip-bun)}, ilmoreun, {19:53(ilgop-si osipsam-bun)}i-eotda.	Yesterday, sunrise was at 5:10 and sunset was at 19:53.

The text below is the preamble to the constitution of the Republic of Korea. The first text is written in Hangul; the second is its mixed script version; and the third is its unofficial English translation.

유구한 역사와 전통에 빛나는 우리 대한 국민은 3⸱1 운동으로 건립된 대한민국 임시 정부의 법통과 불의에 항거한 4⸱19 민주 이념을 계승하고, 조국의 민주 개혁과 평화적 통일의 사명에 입각하여 정의⸱인도와 동포애로써 민족의 단결을 공고히 하고, 모든 사회적 폐습과 불의를 타파하며, 자율과 조화를 바탕으로 자유 민주적 기본 질서를 더욱 확고히 하여 정치⸱경제⸱사회⸱문화의 모든 영역에 있어서 각인의 기회를 균등히 하고, 능력을 최고도로 발휘하게 하며, 자유와 권리에 따르는 책임과 의무를 완수하게 하여, 안으로는 국민 생활의 균등한 향상을 기하고 밖으로는 항구적인 세계 평화와 인류 공영에 이바지함으로써 우리들과 우리들의 자손의 안전과 자유와 행복을 영원히 확보할 것을 다짐하면서 1948년 7월 12일에 제정되고 8차에 걸쳐 개정된 헌법을 이제 국회의 의결을 거쳐 국민 투표에 의하여 개정한다.

1987년 10월 29일

悠久한 歷史와 傳統에 빛나는 우리 大韓國民은 3⸱1 運動으로 建立된 大韓民國臨時政府의 法統과 不義에 抗拒한 4⸱19 民主理念을 繼承하고, 祖國의 民主改革과 平和的統一의 使命에 立脚하여 正義⸱人道와 同胞愛로써 民族의 團結을 鞏固히 하고, 모든 社會的弊習과 不義를 打破하며, 自律과 調和를 바탕으로 自由民主的基本秩序를 더욱 確固히 하여 政治⸱經濟⸱社會⸱文化의 모든 領域에 있어서 各人의 機會를 均等히 하고, 能力을 最高度로 發揮하게 하며, 自由와 權利에 따르는 責任과 義務를 完遂하게 하여, 안으로는 國民生活의 均等한 向上을 基하고 밖으로는 恒久的인 世界平和와 人類共榮에 이바지함으로써 우리들과 우리들의 子孫의 安全과 自由와 幸福을 永遠히 確保할 것을 다짐하면서 1948年 7月 12日에 制定되고 8次에 걸쳐 改正된 憲法을 이제 國會의 議決을 거쳐 國民投票에 依하여 改正한다.

1987年 10月 29日

We, the people of Korea, proud of a resplendent history and traditions dating from time immemorial, upholding the cause of the Provisional Government of the Republic of Korea born of the March First Independence Movement of 1919 and the democratic ideals of the April Revolution of 1960, having assumed the mission of democratic reform and peaceful unification of our homeland and having determined to consolidate national unity with justice, humanitarianism and brotherly love, and to destroy all social vices and injustice, and to afford equal opportunities to every person and provide for the fullest development of individual capabilities in all fields, including political, economic, social and cultural life by further strengthening the free and democratic basic order conducive to private initiative and public harmony, and to help each person discharge those duties and responsibilities concomitant to freedoms and rights, and to elevate the quality of life for all citizens and contribute to lasting world peace and the common prosperity of mankind and thereby to ensure security, liberty and happiness for ourselves and our posterity forever, do hereby amend, through national referendum following a resolution by the National Assembly, the Constitution, ordained and established on July 12, 1948, and amended eight times subsequently.

October 29, 1987

Gallery

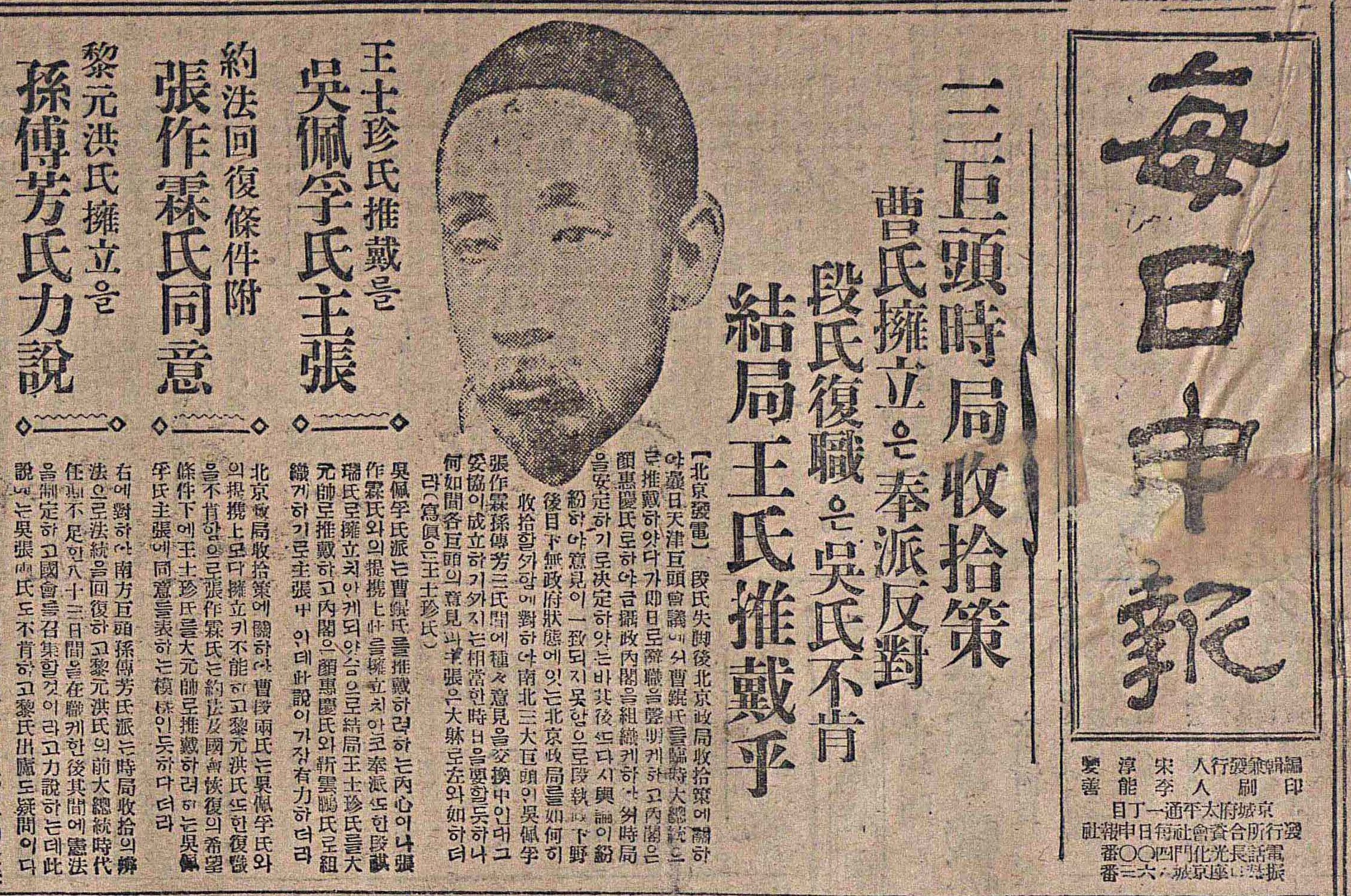
A newspaper on 29 April 1926

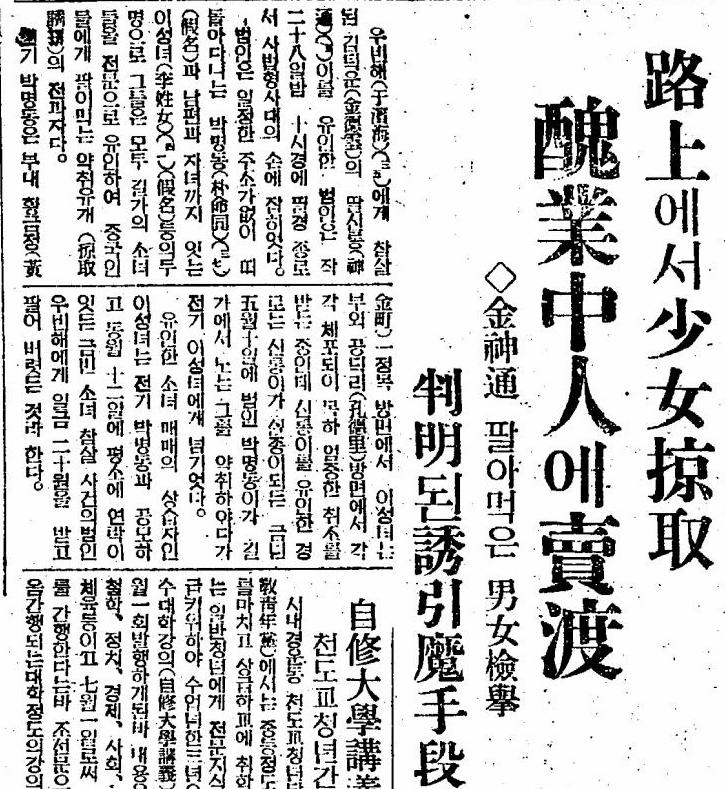
A newspaper on 30 June 1933

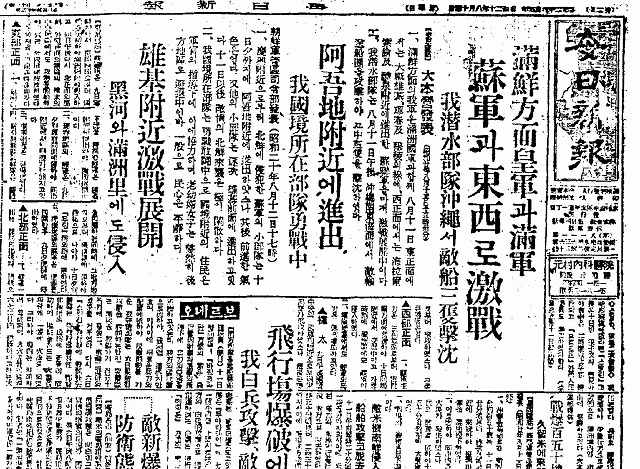
A newspaper on 14 August 1945

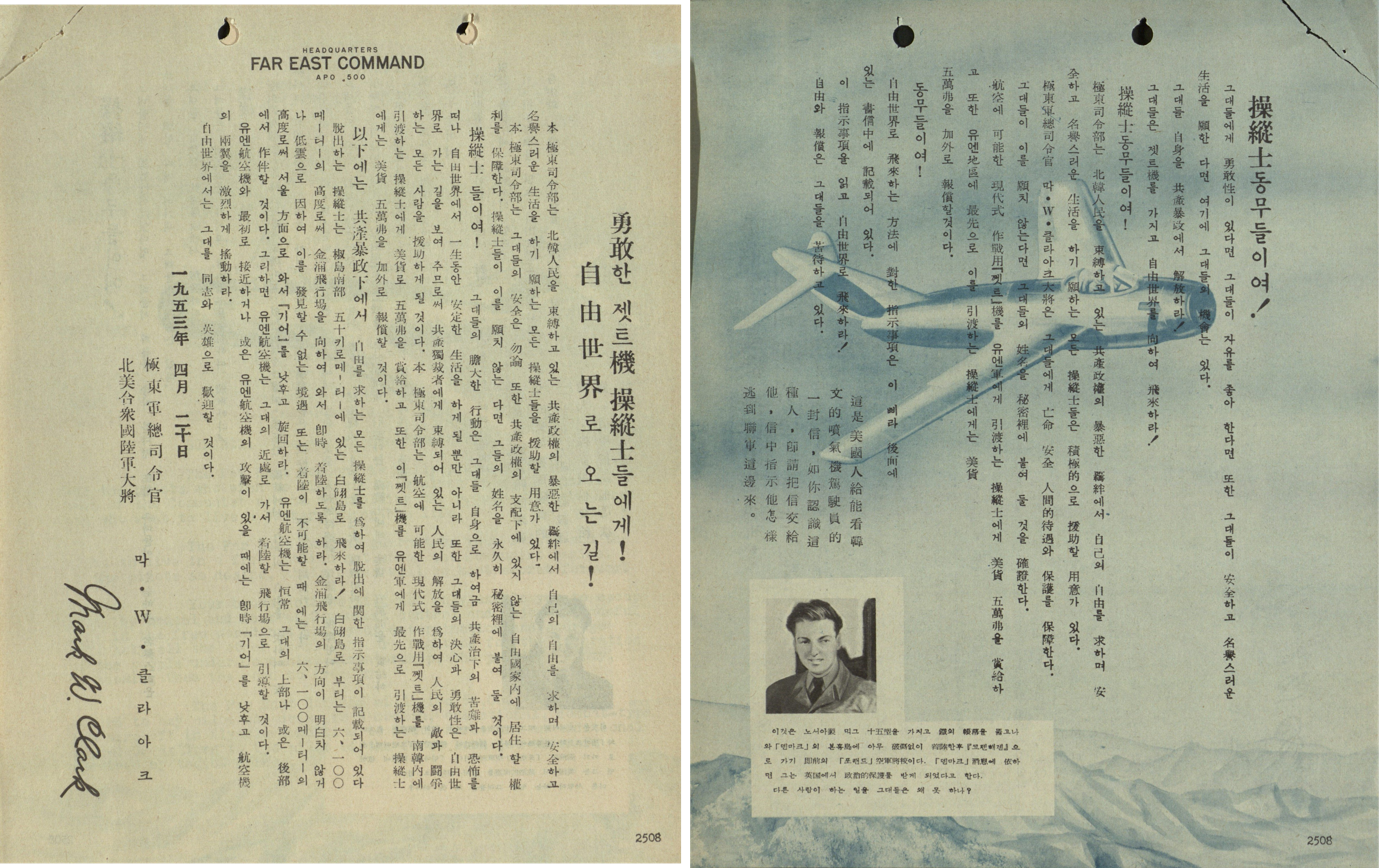
Operation Moolah propaganda leaflet by the US Army during the Korean War promising a $100,000 reward to the first North Korean pilot to defect and deliver a Soviet MiG-15 to UN forces

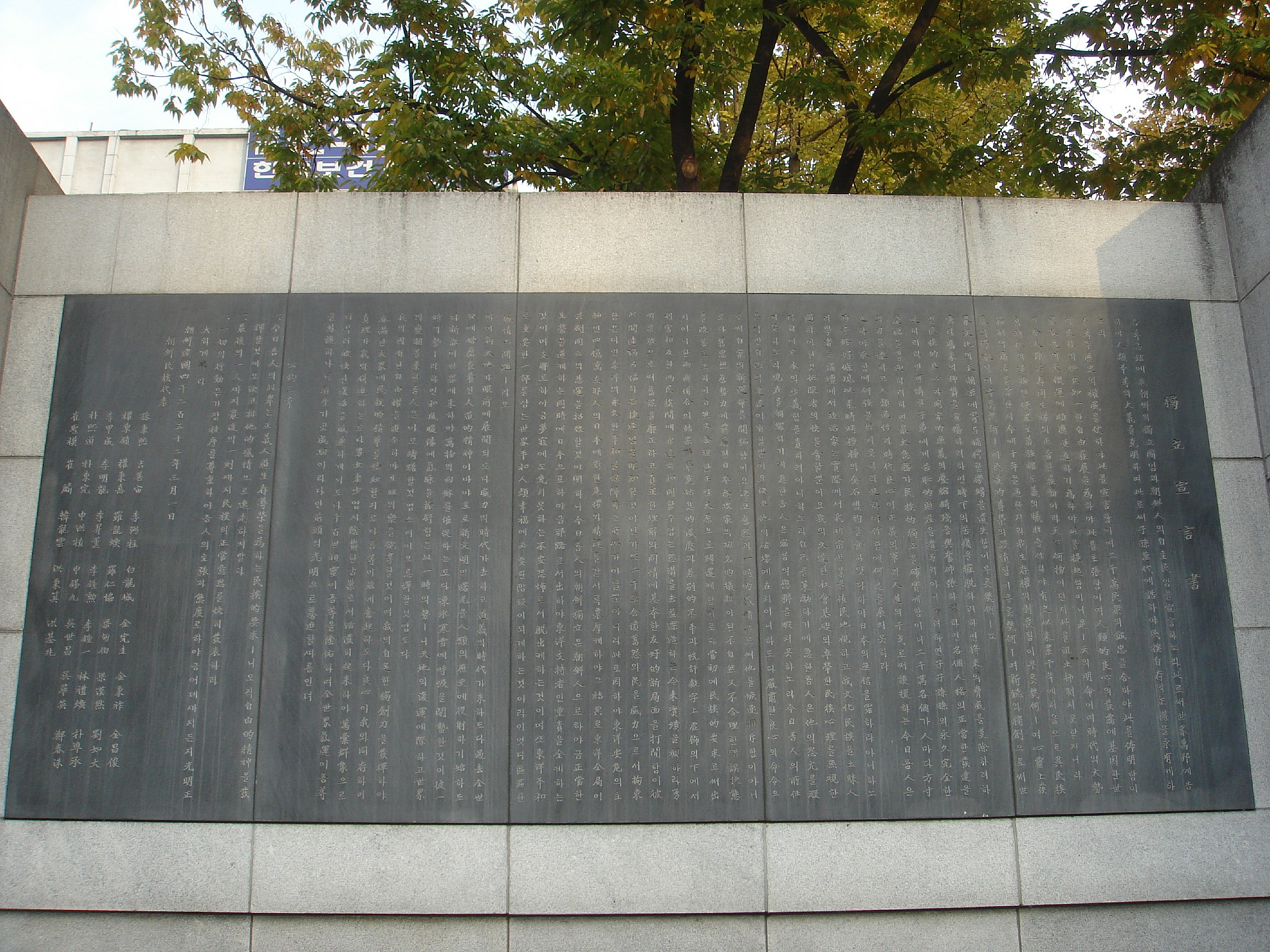
The Korean Declaration of Independence on display at Tapgol Park, Seoul

Mural at Kaeson Revolutionary Site, depicting Kim Il Sung's October 1945 liberation speech in Pyongyang.

North Korean periodical published in December of 1961 describing life in Sinuiju.

== See also ==
- Hanja and Sino-Korean vocabulary
- Debate on mixed script and Hangul exclusivity
- Kanji and Sino-Japanese vocabulary
- Chữ Hán and Sino-Vietnamese vocabulary
- New Korean Orthography
- Egyptian hieroglyphs, another mixed logographic and segmental writing system.
