= CSLD =

CSLD may refer to:

- Cambridge Student Liberal Democrats
- Conway School of Landscape Design
- Cross-strait language database
