= Debate on the use of Korean mixed script =

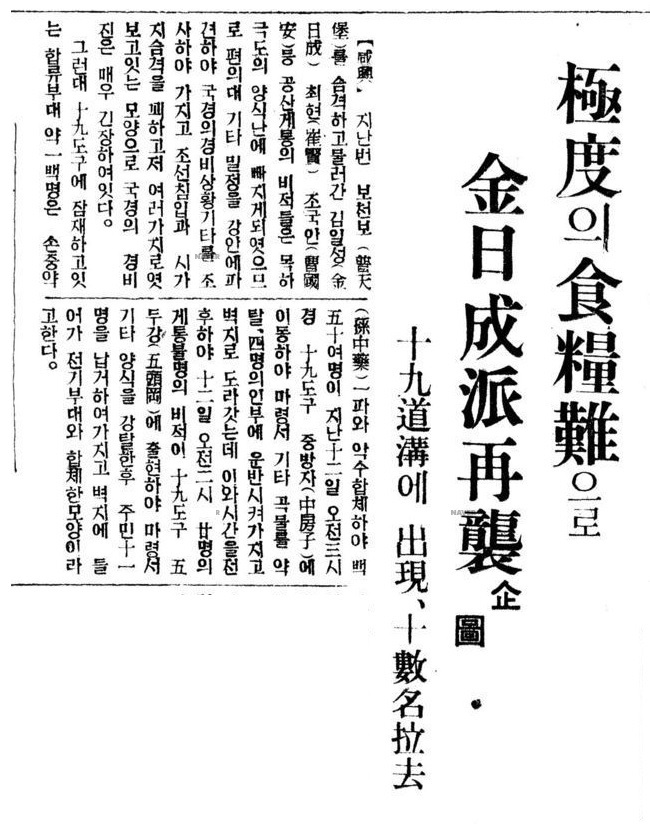
An article written in Korean mixed script on the July 16, 1937 issue of the Donga Ilbo.

The debate on the use of Korean mixed script (Korean: 한자혼용; Hanja: 漢字混用; RR: hanjahonyong) is an ongoing prescriptivist social debate, primarily in South Korea, regarding the digraphic use of Chinese characters, called Hanja (Korean: 한자; Hanja: 漢字; RR: hanja) in Korean, alongside Hangul to write Sino-Korean vocabulary (e.g. 大韓民國 vs. 대한민국) in the Korean language. Common topics of debate often coalesce around arguments regarding Hanja's effects, both from positive and negative stances, on literacy as well as Hanja's place in Korean culture.

== Background ==
Chinese characters have been present in the Korean peninsula since at least the 3rd century BC with its infolding into the Sinosphere. As a result Classical Chinese became a prestige language, leading to a written-diglossia among the intelligentsia. From the introduction of Chinese characters to the Korean peninsula, until the introduction of Hangul with the publication of the Hunminjeongeum by King Sejong the Great, Korean was written primarily by means of Chinese characters through various systems which used them to represent both semantic and phonetic values, like Idu or Hyangchal.

After the proclamation of Hangul, Literary Chinese remained the prestige language in the Korean peninsula until the 20th century. The first major blow to Classical Chinese's prestige came with the Kabo Reform, which stipulated that Korean law be written in the Korean language. This led to the development of a special register of Korean writing known as 'gukhanmun' (Korean: 국한문; Hanja: 國漢文; RR: gukhanmun) (note: this term can also sometimes be confusingly used synonymously with 한자혼용 which refers to the general practice of digraphia in Korean) which heavily blended Classical Chinese, written in Hanja, with Korean grammar written in Hangul, e.g. the Korean Declaration of Independence. Over time, this style developed into a spectrum of written Korean containing various levels of both Sino-Korean vocabulary and written Chinese characters depending on the level of formality. As the 20th century progressed, more and more portions of text, even those containing Sino-Korean vocabulary, were written wholly in Hangul and in the 21st century, the Korean mixed script sees sparing usage.

Nowadays, mixed script writing is mostly used for eye-catching abbreviations in the news or on products, e.g. 與 instead of 여당 (in the news) or 無 instead of 없는 (on a product), stylistically in signage, graphic design and other visual media to evoke a traditional or scholarly vibe, e.g. Shin Ramyun, or for the clarification of otherwise obscure words in text where it is most often written in parentheses after the word, e.g. 사병(傷病).

== Support ==
Proponents of Korean mixed script generally argue for its revival on as a matter of literacy and culture. The National Institute of the Korean Language estimates that Sino-Korean words make up around 57% of Korean vocabulary. Furthermore, Sino-Korean vocabulary is often homophonic sometimes leading to etymological confusion. Therefore supporters of mixed script revival often argue that literacy and understanding of texts is made difficult because the large proportion of Sino-Korean vocabulary in Korean can be identical when written in Hangul, therefore by reviving mixed script writing these difficulties will be clarified in writing. Culturally, Korea has been influenced by the Sinosphere since at least the Han conquest of Gojoseon in the 1st century BC. This lead to the development of a strong Sinospheric culture in Korea which persists to this day. Therefore supporters of mixed script revival often argue that the abandonment of Hanja is an abandonment of a facet of Korean identity as a Sinosphere culture.

== Opposition ==
Opponents of Korean mixed script generally argue for Hangul-only text likewise as a matter of literacy and culture. Oftentimes synonymous native Korean words, or synonymous Sino-Korean words, are enough to disambiguate what might otherwise be confusing text, e.g. 오늘 instead of 금일(今日) or 서적(書籍) instead of the homophones 도서(圖書) and 도서(島嶼). Likewise, it is argued that etymology can be taught in schools without explicitly teaching the original script a given word comes from. Furthermore, it is argued that Hangul's alphabetic and syllabic nature makes it comparatively significantly simpler to learn than Chinese characters. Therefore opposers of mixed script often argue that the confusion and difficult of learning Chinese characters do not outweigh the benefits of Hangul-only text which can be easily disambiguated through synonyms or clarification, Sino-Korean etymology taught without the use of mixed script and remain understandable to a wide audience. Culturally, it is argued that, while part of the historic Sinosphere, contemporary Korea represents its own unique culture of which Hangul is a substantial part. Therefore opposers of mixed script revival often argue that Hangul, as a unique aspect of Korean culture, is a reflection of Korean identity.
