= Cross-strait language database =

Chinese word database

A cross-strait language database is an online Chinese word database launched by the General Association of Chinese Culture (GACC) in 2012 to store information about different Chinese characters and words usage exchanges. Cross-strait refers to across the Taiwan Strait, relating to the politically separate entities of Republic of China ("Taiwan") and People's Republic of China ("China").

== 2008-2009 ==
In 2008 Taiwan president Ma Ying-jeou initially planned to deliver a cross-strait cultural exchange dictionary (中華大辭典) that people on both sides of the Taiwan Strait, Taiwan and China can use. Further discussions were held in July 2009 at Changsha on the collaboration of the project and reduce the differences between the different sets of characters. For example, the Chinese word for software is known as "ruanti" (軟體) in Taiwan, but "ruanjian" (軟件) in mainland China. The database could help point out differences in the divergence of words caused by over 60 years of separation between the two regions.

== 2012 ==
On February 8, 2012, a press conference was held to open up the database. While Ma had said there are no political intentions, he did defend the use of traditional Chinese characters. He said Simplified Chinese characters are too streamlined, and there is no logic, so they require pure memorization. For example, the characters for Han (漢), the surname Deng (鄧) and the word for theatre (戲) have no relation to each other, however the simplified forms (汉, 邓, 戏) make it appear as if they are related. There were also questions from educational panels that this project may violate the "language neutrality act" (語言平等法) since Taiwan has many languages including aboriginal languages.

Taiwan released a version at chinese-linguipedia.org, and mainland China released their own version at zhonghuayuwen.org.

== 2013-2014 ==
GACC worked with the MoeDict (Taiwan's online Ministry of Education dictionary) project to publish the Taiwan version of CSLD into web, mobile and offline apps.

== See also ==
- Cross-Strait Unification
- Debate on traditional and simplified Chinese characters
- Taiwan independence
