= Wakan konkō-bun =

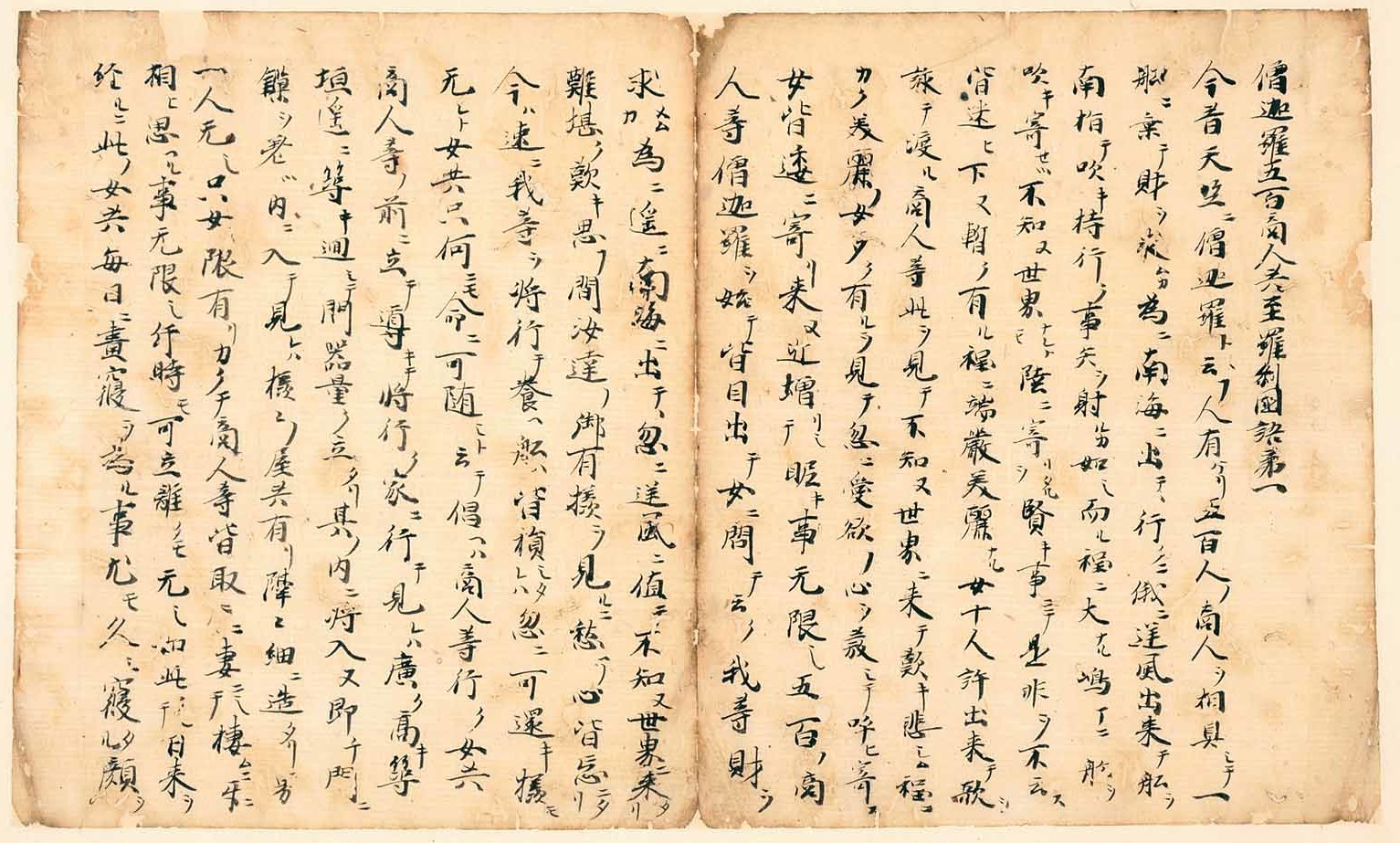
Konjaku Monogatarishū manuscript from the Heian period.

Wakan konkōbun (和漢混淆文) is a Japanese writing style which uses a mix of Japanese and Chinese writing styles that intermingles Japanese and Chinese character readings, grammar, and lexical styles. It came from the practice of using marks, added to Chinese characters, to indicate the order in which to read them for Japanese speakers. Wakan Konkō Bun was often written in Hiragana and derived from Japanese reading conventions for classical Chinese. Wakan Konkō Bun shows that the development of written Japanese is inseparable from the use of literary Chinese. It can be considered a transition style between pure kanbun and modern Japanese.

== Works using Wakan Konkō Bun ==
Many classical works use Wakan Konkō Bun. Many of these originated in the Heian period or after.

Collection of Tales of a Time now Past (今昔物語, Konjaku Monogatari) is one of them. Collection of Tales from a Time now Past is a collection of 1039 Setsuwa compiled in the early 12th century during the Heian Period. These stories are not presented as though they were being spoken by a narrator, but rather as transmissions of stories that have been heard, passed down, and recorded.

The Tale of the Heike (平家物語, Heike Monogatari) also used the wakan konkō-bun writing style, as it contains Chinese literary influence from the Wakan Rōeishū poetry collection. The Tale of the Heike is an epic account of the wars between the Minamoto and Taira clans at the end of the 12th Century. The use of Wakan Konkō Bun has been credited for helping achieve the intensity of the battles found within The Tale of the Heike.

Not all works written in Wakan Konkō Bun are from the Heian period. "Destiny" by Koda Rohan was written in 1919 using Wakan Konkō Bun.
