= Kanbun =

Literary Chinese as written and read in Japan

Kanbun (Japanese: 漢文, "Sinitic writing") usually refers to writing in Literary Sinitic, including works composed in Japan. The term can also include Japanized texts that depart to varying degrees from the vocabulary or grammar of Literary Sinitic. Kanbun kundoku (漢文訓読) is a method of reading these texts in Japanese, using Japanese words and grammatical forms and changing the reading order where necessary. The Japanese reading uses a specialized literary register and may combine Sino-Japanese on'yomi and native kun'yomi readings rather than simply reciting every character with its Sino-Japanese pronunciation.

Kanbun was a major part of premodern Japanese literature alongside works written in Japanese. It included Chinese classics and Buddhist scriptures as well as works by Japanese authors.

== History ==
Kanbun in its most literal definition means "Chinese writing". The Japanese writing system originated through adoption and adaptation of written Chinese (kanbun). Some of Japan's oldest books (e.g. the Nihon Shoki) and dictionaries (e.g. the Tenrei Banshō Meigi and Wamyō Ruijushō) were written in kanbun. Other Japanese literary genres have parallels; the Kaifūsō is the oldest collection of kanshi (漢詩; 'Chinese poetry'). Burton Watson's English translations of kanbun compositions provide an introduction to this literary field.

Evidence of Japanese kundoku survives from the late Nara period, and earlier inscriptions suggest that simpler forms of the practice were already in use. The oldest manuscript with reading-order marks identified by Teiji Kosukegawa is volume five of a Buddhist commentary, the Zoku Kegonkyō ryakusho kanjōki (続華厳経略疏刊定記). It contains colophons recording comparisons with Silla and Tang exemplars in 783 and 788. Its numerical marks indicate an order compatible with Japanese, but may have been copied from the Silla exemplar rather than added by a Japanese reader.

Reading conventions formerly varied between schools. Rules for punctuation, return marks and okurigana were standardized in Japanese school education following a report submitted to the Ministry of Education in 1912.

Kanbun is described by Jean-Noël Robert as a "perfectly frozen 'dead'" language that was continuously used from the late Heian period (794–1185) until after World War II. Kanbun, otherwise known as Classical Chinese or Literary Chinese, had long since ceased to be a colloquial language in China. Yet all the oldest writing in Japan are in kanbun and predate any written documents in Japanese, although there is considerable debate if these Chinese texts contained traces of the Japanese vernacular. Taking into consideration all the texts written in both Japanese and Chinese, including monastic documents, as well as 'near-Chinese' (hentai-kanbun) texts, the amount of Chinese writing in Japan may exceed what was written in Japanese. Writing in 1998, John Timothy Wixted argued that kanbun had been neglected in Japanese literary studies and was poorly represented in the literary canon.

Samuel Martin coined the term Sino-Xenic as a collective label for Sino-Japanese, Sino-Korean, Sino-Vietnamese and comparable traditions. Japanese kundoku has a close parallel in Korean hundok gugyeol, which also renders Literary Sinitic texts in the reader's own language. Kundoku has remained widely used in Japan. In modern Korea, reading with Sino-Korean pronunciations predominates, although forms of gugyeol are still practised.

Readers use punctuation and reading marks to interpret a Sinitic text and render it in a conventional form of Classical Japanese. Kundoku conventions provide Japanese equivalents for Chinese words and grammatical constructions, but do not always produce a word-for-word rendering: Japanese particles and inflections may be added, and the choice of vocabulary varies between reading traditions.

There were several linguistic hurdles involved in kanbun transformation. Chinese grammatical order is subject–verb–object (SVO) and uses particles similar to English prepositions whereas morphemes are typically one syllable in length and inflection plays no role in the grammar. Conversely, Japanese sentence order uses SOV with syntactic features, including postpositions such as grammar particles that appear after the words and phrases to which they apply.

Four major problems faced when transforming kanbun are the word order, parsing which Chinese characters should be read together, deciding how to pronounce the characters, and finding suitable equivalents for Chinese function words.

Nishogakusha University provides a public database of bibliographic records for Japanese kanbun and related works.

== Terminology ==
The Japanese word kanbun originally meant 'Literary Chinese writings'—or, the Chinese classics. Kanbun can be read using both Sino-Japanese on'yomi readings, derived from Chinese pronunciations, and native Japanese kun'yomi readings. For example, 道 ("road" or "way") has the readings dō and michi. The choice between on and kun readings varies with the text and reading tradition.

Texts that follow the grammatical and lexical conventions of Literary Sinitic are sometimes distinguished as jun-kanbun (純漢文; "pure kanbun"). Hentai-kanbun (変体漢文; "variant kanbun") refers to writing that departs from those conventions to varying degrees, including through the use of Japanese vocabulary.

An unannotated Chinese text is called hakubun (白文; "blank writing"). Reading aids added to it include punctuation, return marks to indicate Japanese word order, and okurigana to supply inflectional endings and particles. A text rewritten in Japanese reading order is called kakikudashibun. Furigana are kana placed beside characters to indicate their readings.

kunten (訓点, 'explanation mark')
Guiding marks for rendering Chinese into Japanese
kundoku (訓読, "explanation reading")
Reading a Literary Sinitic text using Japanese word order, vocabulary, and grammar
kanbun kundoku (漢文訓読, "Chinese writing Japanese reading")
The conventional Japanese reading of a Literary Sinitic passage
okototen (乎古止点, 'inflectional dot marks')
Diacritical dots on characters to indicate Japanese grammatical inflections
kutōten (句読点, 'phrase reading marks')
Punctuation marks analogous to commas and full stops
kaeriten (返り点, 'return marker')
Marks placed alongside characters indicating their Japanese ordering is to be read in reverse

Kaeriten grammatically transforms Literary Chinese into Japanese word order. Two are syntactic symbols, the | tatesen (縦線, 'vertical bar')—linking mark that denotes phrases composed of more than one character, and the レ reten (レ点; '[katakana] re mark') denotes 'reverse marks'. The rest are kanji commonly used in numbering and ordering systems:

- Four numerals: ichi 一 'one', ni 二 'two', san 三 'three', and yon 四 'four'
- Three locatives: ue 上 'top', naka 中 'middle', and shita 下 'bottom'
- Four Heavenly Stems: kinoe 甲 'first', kinoto 乙 'second', hinoe 丙 'third', and hinoto 丁 'fourth'
- Three cosmological sansai (三才, 'three worlds'), see Wakan Sansai Zue: ten 天 'heaven', chi 地 'earth', and jin 人 'person'.

For written English, these kaeriten would correspond with 1, 2, 3; I, II, III; A, B, C, etc.

As an analogy for kanbun changing the word order from Chinese sentences with subject–verb–object (SVO) into Japanese subject–object–verb (SOV), John DeFrancis gives this example of using a literal English translation—another SVO language—of the opening of the Latin-language Commentarii de Bello Gallico.

Gallia est omnis divisa in partes tres
2‍ 3‍ 1‍ 4‍ 5‍ 7‍ 6‍
Gaul is all divided into parts three

Read in numerical order, this becomes "All Gaul is divided into three parts". DeFrancis adds, "A better analogy would be the reverse situation–Caesar rendering an English text in his native language and adding Latin case endings."

English introductions include Sydney Crawcour's An Introduction to Kambun and Akira Komai and Thomas H. Rohlich's An Introduction to Japanese Kanbun.

== Example ==
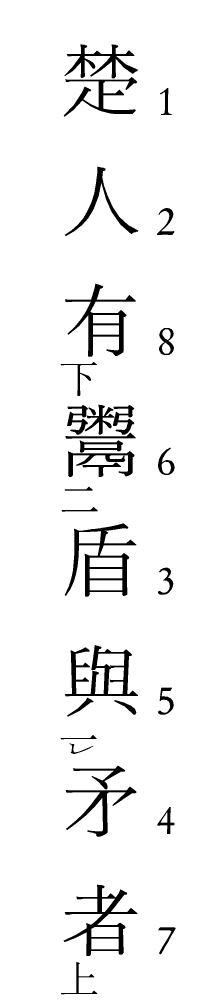
Kaeriten example from the Han Feizi

The illustration to the right exemplifies kanbun. These eight words comprise the well-known first line in the Han Feizi story (ch. 36) that first coined the term máodùn (Japanese mujun, 矛盾 'contradiction, inconsistency', lit. "spear-shield"), illustrating the irresistible force paradox. Debating with a Confucianist about the legendary Chinese sage rulers Yao and Shun, the Legalist Han Fei argues that one cannot praise them both because that would be making a "spear–shield" contradiction.

Among the Chu, there was a man selling shields and spears. He praised the former saying, "My shields are so solid nothing can penetrate them". Then he would praise his spears saying, "My spears are so sharp that among all things there's nothing they can't penetrate". Somebody else said, "If somebody tried to penetrate your shields with your spears, what would happen?" The man could not respond.

The first sentence would read thus, using modern Standard Chinese pronunciation:

楚 人 有 鬻 盾 與 矛 者
Chǔ rén yǒu yù dùn yǔ máo zhě
Chu person exist sell shield and spear NMZ

A fairly literal translation would be "among Chu people, there existed somebody who was selling shields and spears". All words can be literally translated into English, except for the final particle zhě 者 'one who', 'somebody who', which works as nominalizer marking a verb phrase as certain kinds of noun phrases. The original Chinese sentence is marked with five Japanese kaeriten as:

楚人有_{下}鬻_{二}盾與_{一レ}矛者_{上}

To interpret this, The re レ 'reverse' mark indicates that the order of the adjacent characters, 與 and 矛, must be reversed:

楚人有_{下}鬻_{二}盾與_{一}_{レ}矛者_{上}
楚人有_{下}鬻_{二}盾矛與_{一}者_{上}

The word 有 'existed' marked with shita 下 'bottom' is shifted after 者 marked by ue 上 'top':

楚人有_{下}鬻_{二}盾矛與_{一}者_{上}
楚人鬻_{二}盾矛與_{一}者有

Likewise, the word 鬻 'sell' marked with ni 二 'two' is shifted to after 與 marked by ichi 一 'one':

楚人鬻_{二}盾矛與_{一}者有
楚人盾矛與鬻者有

To represent this reading in numerical terms:

楚 人 有 鬻 盾 與 矛 者
1‍ 2‍ 8‍ 6‍ 3‍ 5‍ 4‍ 7‍

Following these kanbun instructions step by step transforms the sentence so it has the typical Japanese subject–object–verb argument order. The Sino-Japanese on'yomi readings and meanings are:

楚 人 盾 矛 與 鬻 者 有
So jin jun mu yo iku sha yū
Chu person shield spear and sell NMZ exist

Next, Japanese function words and conjugations can be added with okurigana, and Japanese to ... to と...と 'and' can substitute Chinese 與 'and'. More specifically, the first と is treated as an additional function word, and the second, the reading of 與:

楚人に盾と矛とを鬻ぐ者有り

Lastly, kun'yomi readings for characters can be annotated with furigana. Normally furigana are only used for uncommon kanji or unusual readings. This sentence's only uncommon kanji is hisa(gu) 鬻ぐ 'sell', 'deal in', a literary character which is included in neither the kyōiku kanji nor the jōyō kanji lists. However, in kanbun texts it is relatively common to use a large amount of furigana—often there is an interest in recovering the readings used by people of the Heian or Nara periods, and since many kanji can be read either with on'yomi or kun'yomi pronunciations in a kanbun text, the furigana can show at least one editor's opinion of how it may have been read.

楚(そ)人(ひと)に盾(たて)と矛(ほこ)とを鬻(ひさ)ぐ者(もの)有(あ)り

The completed kundoku translation reads as a well-formed Japanese sentence with kun'yomi:

楚 人 に 盾 と 矛 と を 鬻 ぐ 者 有 り
So hito ni tate to hoko to o hisa gu mono a ri
Chu people among shields and spears and OBJ sell- ing -er exist- s

This annotated kanbun translates to, "among Chu people, there existed one who was selling shields and spears".

=== Complicated example ===
To illustrate what is possible with kaeriten, here follows a rather complicated example from Crawcour's book, to which he notes: "The student may take some slight comfort from the fact that this is as complicated as these markings can get."

使_{㆟}籍誠不_{㆚}以_{㆘}蓄_{㆓}妻子_{㆒}，憂_{㆗}飢寒_{㆖}亂_{㆙㆑}心，有_{㆑}錢以濟_{㆞}醫藥_{㆝}，其盲未_{㆑}甚，庶幾其復見_{㆓}天地日月_{㆒}。（韓愈・代張籍與李浙東書）

is rendered as

籍(せき)をして誠(まこと)に妻子(さいし)を蓄(たくは)へ、飢寒(きかん)を憂(うれ)ふるを以(もっ)て心(こころ)を亂(みだ)さず、錢(せん)を有(たも)ちて以(もっ)て醫藥(いやく)を濟(な)さしめば、其(そ)の盲(まう)未(いま)だ甚(はなはだ)しからず庶幾(ほとんど)其(そ)れ復(また)天地(てんち)日月(じつげつ)を見(み)ん。

== Unicode ==
Kanbun marks were included in version 1.0 of the Unicode Standard, published in 1991. The block contains a linking mark (㆐), a reverse mark (㆑), and marks based on numerals (㆒–㆕), positional terms (㆖–㆘), Heavenly Stems (㆙–㆜), and the characters for heaven, earth and person (㆝–㆟).

The Unicode block for kanbun is U+3190..319F:

Kanbun^{[1]} Official Unicode Consortium code chart (PDF)
	0	1	2	3	4	5	6	7	8	9	A	B	C	D	E	F
U+319x	㆐	㆑	㆒	㆓	㆔	㆕	㆖	㆗	㆘	㆙	㆚	㆛	㆜	㆝	㆞	㆟
Notes 1.As of Unicode version 18.0

== See also ==
- Gugyeol
- Idu script
- Interlinear gloss
- Chữ Nôm
- Giải âm
- Wakan Konko Bun
