= Kugyŏl =

Classical Chinese to Korean translation system

- Hangul: 구결
- Hanja: 口訣
- RR: gugyeol
- MR: kugyŏl

Alternate name
- Hangul: 입겿
- RR: ipgyeot
- MR: ipkyŏt

Kugyŏl (also Romanized as gugyeol or kwukyel, among others) is a family of annotation systems for rendering texts written in Classical Chinese into understandable Korean. Believed to have been developed after the introduction of Chinese Characters during the Three Kingdoms period of Korea, its oldest record is found within Buddhist texts in Chinese from the Goryeo period; reached the height of its use during the Joseon dynasty, when readings of the Chinese classics were of paramount social importance.

In kugyŏl, the original text in Classical Chinese was not modified, and the additional markers were simply inserted between words or phrases. Therefore, ignoring the kugyŏl annotations, the text would be readable as regular Classical Chinese.

== Etymology ==
The term kugyŏl (Hanja: 口訣) can be rendered as "phrase parting" and may refer to the separation of one Chinese phrase from another. This name is itself believed to originate from the use of hanja characters to represent the Middle Korean phrase ipgyeot (입겿), with a similar meaning. Kugyŏl is also sometimes referred to as to (토; 吐), or hyeonto (현토; 懸吐), since to is also used to refer to the morphological affixes themselves or as seogui (석의; 釋義), which can be rendered as "interpretation of the classics."

== Terminology ==
Depending on the period, the kugyŏl markings were (sometimes abbreviated) Chinese characters, called jato kugyŏl (자토구결; 字吐口訣). In some cases, they were marked with simple dots and lines, called jeomto kugyŏl (점토구결; 點吐口訣) whose positions and angles relative to the Chinese character encoded its reading. Jeomto kugyŏl is similar to the okototen system in Japanese. After the advent of Hangul in the 15th century, kugyŏl also started to be written using Hangul, called hangul kugyŏl (한글구결).

The kugyŏl annotations were marked on paper using a stylus with no ink, called gakpil kugyŏl (각필구결; 角筆口訣), or handwritten with ink, or in some cases printed with the Classical Chinese text.

Some early kugyŏl specify the order in which the Chinese words should be read, effectively reordering the Chinese sentence into Korean word order. This is called yeokdok kugyŏl (역독구결; 逆讀口訣) or seokdok kugyŏl (석독구결; 釋讀口訣), which is comparable to kanbun kundoku in Japanese. On the other hand, the vast majority of later instances of kugyŏl keep the original Chinese word order. This is called sundok kugyŏl (순독구결; 順讀口訣).

== History ==
Kugyŏl is first attested from the 11th century in the early Goryeo dynasty, but evidence indicates it likely dates back to the 7th century or earlier. It is theorized that the system was created after the introduction of Classical Chinese during the Three Kingdoms period, where each kingdom (Goguryeo, Paekche, and Silla) created branches within their governments to better study and popularize the Chinese Characters. Regardless, contemporary evidence indicates that certain hanja characters were used (along with specialized symbols) to represent Korean sounds through their meaning. For example, the syllable '잇' (is) was represented with the hanja character 有 since that character has the Korean meaning '있다.' This technique came to be replaced in the late Goryeo period with using hanja characters according to their sound. The later version of the kugyŏl system was formalized by Chŏng Mong-ju and Kwŏn Kŭn around 1400 in the early Joseon Dynasty, at the behest of King Taejong. Many Confucian classics, including the Classic of Poetry, were rendered into kugyŏl at the time.

The term kugyŏl is often extended beyond this early system to similar uses of hangul following the introduction of the Hunminjeongeum in the 15th century. In this respect, kugyŏl remains in occasional use in contemporary South Korea, where such techniques are still sometimes used to render the Confucian classics into readable form.

Kugyŏl should be distinguished from the idu and hyangchal systems, which preceded it. Kugyŏl used specialized markings, together with a subset of hanja, to represent Korean morphological markers as an aid for Korean readers to understand the grammar of Chinese texts. Also, the idu and the hyangchal systems appear to have been used primarily to render Korean into hanja; on the other hand, kugyŏl sought to render Chinese texts into Korean with a minimum of distortion.

== Table of Kugyŏl ==
List of Kugyŏl Characters
力 ⿻力丶 加 叻 可			大 夫 巨		令	十
가 [k/ga]			거 [kʌ]		게 [ke]	겨
囗 古	昆	人 八 戈 曰 果 朩				
고 [ko]	곤 [kon]	과 [kwa]				
官	尔 示	印	己	⿺乚言	万 尹 𭃂 那	
관 [kwan]	금 [kɨm]	긋 [kɨt]	긔 [kɨj]	걷 [kəm]	나 [na]	
難	攵	又 奴 卜		論	了	卜
난 [nan]	녀 [njʌ]	노 [no]		논 [non]	뇨 [njo]	누 [nu]
匕 尼 行		乇 斤 椛		丨 夕 多 如 支		
니 [ni]		널 [nəl]		다 [t/da]		
十 大	力 ⿻力丶 加		亇 氏 㡳		丁	上 劣
대 [tæ]	더 [tʌ]		뎌 [tjʌ]		뎡 [tʌng]	데 [tje]
田	刀 都 巴		斗-itaiji-002 斗 亘		士 地 矢 知 支	
뎐 [tjʌn]	도 [to]		두 [tu]		디 [ti]	
㖦	䓁	の 朩 月 冬 人			厶 宎 弋 代	
딘 [tin]	던 [tən]	덜 [təl]			데 [təj]	
丶 亽 罒 罖 羅			難 良	汝 馿 驢 女 尸 户		
라 [ra]			란 [ran]	러 [rʌ]		
要 呂	⿲丶丶丶 ⿲丶丶丶 ⿲丶丶丶 以			⿱夕𣱳	論	了
려 [rjʌ]	로 [ro]			록 [rok]	론 [ron]	료 [rjo]
刂 开 牙 犭 利 仒 曰 里				吝	㇉ 亇 广 庅 麻 麽	
리 [ri]				림 [rim]	마 [ma]	
万 萬	賣	⿺㇉丶 久 ⿱亼小 㫆 㢱 彌			丆 面	毛
만 [man]	매 [mæ]	며 [mjʌ]			면 [mjʌn]	모 [mo]
勿 刁	丷 米 未		火	氵 沙	人 𱎛 舍	
믈 [mɨl]	미 [mi]		버 [bə]	사 [sa]	샤 [sja]	
一 覀 彳 亣 立			户 所	小	丶 是 二 示	
셔 [sjʌ]			소 [so]	쇼 [sjo]	시 [si]	
寸 时 盽 氏		申	士 罒 币		白	生
		신 [sin]	서 [sə]		섧 [sərp]	생 [səjng]
氵 沙	旧 ⿱日儿 児		𠄎 ⿰𠄌人 良 卩 阿 牙			厂 厓
싸 [za]	써 [zə]		아 [a]			애 [æ]
𠃌 也	方 才 仒		亖 言	檗	亠 八 亦 余 匀	
야 [ja]	어 [ʌ]		언 [ʌn]	얼 [ʌl]	여 [jʌ]	
曳 之	𠂉 午 五 勹 丿 乊 乎				玉	𥁕 溫
예 [je]	오 [o]				옥 [ok]	온 [on]
卜 臥	覀 要	于 牛	位	㐆	⿱亠丿 衣 厶 矣	
와 [wa]	요 [jo]	우 [u]	위 [wi]	은 [ɨn]	의 [ɨj]	
丶 是 刂 己 伊		弋	引 印		成	广 刃
이 [i]		익 [ik]	인 [in]		일 [il]	이 [ŋi]
时	其 斉 齊		之	孑	他	土 吐
제 [ʧ/ʤe]	져 [ʧʌ]		지 [ʧi]	자 [ʧa]	타 [tʰa]	토 [tʰa]
下 何	丿 乊 乎 尸 户 好				忽	𠔃 屎
하 [ha]	호 [ho]				홀 [hol]	히 [hi]
ソ ⿸⿵⿽⿻丿𠃍丶一⿱𠃍𠃌 爲	亽 十 中					
허 [hə]	헤 [həj]					

Final consonant notation
八 ⿸𢀳丶 只	𠃍 阝 隱	乚 乙 尸	亣 立 音
ㄱ final k	ㄴ final n	ㄹ final l	ㅁ final m
卫 巴 邑	七 止 ソ		
ㅂ final p	ㅅ final t	ㅇ final ng	

== See also ==
- Hanja
- Idu
- Hyangchal
- Hangul
- Katakana
- Kanbun
- Giải âm
