= Idu script =

Archaic Korean language writing system

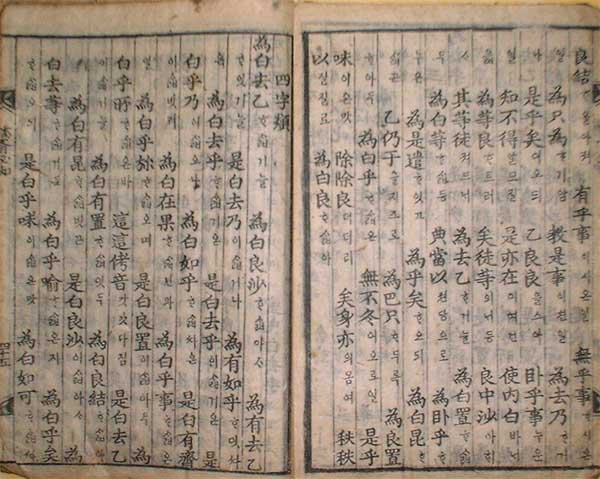
- An instruction for idu from the 19th-century Yuseopilji

Korean name
- Hangul: 이두
- Hanja: 吏讀
- RR: idu
- MR: idu

Idu (Korean: 이두; Hanja: 吏讀; lit. 'official's reading') was a writing system developed during the Three Kingdoms period of Korea (57 BC – 668 AD) to write the Korean language using Chinese characters ("hanja"). It used Hanja to represent both native Korean words and grammatical morphemes as well as Chinese loanwords. The script, which was developed by Buddhist monks, made it possible to record Korean words through their equivalent meaning or sound in Chinese. It was used primarily to write official documents and the imperial examinations from 958 to 1894 AD.

The term idu may refer to various systems of representing Korean phonology through hanja, which were used from the early Three Kingdoms to Joseon periods. In this sense, it includes hyangchal, the local writing system used to write vernacular poetry and gugyeol writing. Its narrow sense only refers to idu proper or the system developed in Goryeo (918–1392), and first referred to by that name in the Jewang ungi.

== History ==
The Idu script developed during the Three Kingdoms period of Korea between 57 BC and 668 AD. It was used for writing official documents and the imperial examinations from 958 to 1894 AD. The Idu script was used to write both native Korean expressions as well as Chinese characters (Hanja) that still retained their original meaning and Chinese pronunciation (loanwords). The basic words were commonly Chinese in origin, written in Hanja, and pronounced approximately in the same way as in Chinese (on). However unlike Classical Chinese, the Idu script also incorporated Korean words and Korean grammatical morphemes represented using Hanja that only retained their pronunciation but not their original meaning. They were used purely for their phonetic values to represent Korean expressions. The Idu script was written in Korean grammatical word order.

Aside from writing official documents and imperial examinations, the Idu script was also used to clarify Chinese government documents written in Classical Chinese so that they could be understood by Korean readers, to teach Koreans Classical Chinese, and to translate Chinese documents such as the Ming legal code and the Essentials of agriculture and sericulture (Nongsan jiyao) (ordered by the King Taejong in 1414).

== Example ==
The following example is from the 1415 book Yangjam Gyeongheom Chwaryo (양잠경험촬요; 養蠶經驗撮要, lit. 'Collected Summary of the Experiences of Silkworm Cultivation').

Literary Chinese	蠶陽物大惡水故食而不飮
Idu transcription	蠶段陽物是乎等用良水氣乙厭却桑葉叱分喫破爲遣飮水不冬
Old Korean	蠶ᄯᆞᆫ 陽物이온ᄃᆞ로ᄡᅥ 水氣ᄅᆞᆯ 厭却 桑葉ᄲᅮᆫ 喫破ᄒᆞ고 飮水안ᄃᆞᆯ
Modern Korean	누에는 양물로써, 물기를 싫어해, 뽕잎만 먹고, 물을 마시지 않는다.
Meaning	Silkworm is Yang (positive) animal, it doesn't like water's gi, so it eats mulberry leaves but does not drink water.

== See also ==
- Korean language
- Hunminjeongeum
- Kanbun
- Man'yōgana

== Bibliography ==
- Li, Yu (2020), The Chinese Writing System in Asia
