= Hyangch'al =

Archaic Korean writing system

- Hangul: 향찰
- Hanja: 鄕札
- RR: hyangchal
- MR: hyangch'al

Hyangch'al (Korean: 향찰; Hanja: 鄕札; lit. 'vernacular letters', 'local letters', or 'corresponded sound') is an archaic writing system of Korea and was used to transcribe the Korean language in Chinese characters. Using the hyangch'al system, Chinese characters were given a Korean reading based on the syllable associated with the character. The hyangch'al writing system is often classified as a subgroup of the Idu script.

The first mention of hyangch'al is the monk Kyun Ye's biography during the Goryeo period. Hyangch'al is best known as the method Koreans used to write hyangga poetry. Twenty-five such poems still exist and show that vernacular poetry used native Korean words and Korean word order, and each syllable was "transcribed with a single graph". The writing system covered nouns, verbs, adjectives, adverbs, particles, suffixes, and auxiliary verbs. The practice of hyangch'al continued during the Goryeo era, where it was used to record native Korean poetry as well.

== Example of hyangch'al text ==
The following example is the first verse of the poem Cheo Yong Ga (처용가; 處容歌).

Original text	東京明期月良夜入伊遊行如可
Reconstructed middle Korean	東京 ᄇᆞᆯ기ㅣ ᄃᆞ라 밤드리 노니다가.
Meaning	Under the moonlight of Tonggyŏng, having caroused far into the sunrise.

== See also ==
- Idu script
- Hanja
