= Outline of the Korean language =

Topical guide to the Korean language

The following outline is provided as an overview of and topical guide to the Korean language:

Korean – East Asian language spoken by about 80 million people. It is a member of the Koreanic language family and is the official and national language of North Korea and South Korea, which form Korea. It is also one of the two official languages in the Yanbian Korean Autonomous Prefecture and Changbai Korean Autonomous County of Jilin, China. Korean was historically categorized as a language isolate, but this classification is no longer widely accepted because the Jejuan language, which has no mutual intelligibility with any mainland Korean variety, is increasingly recognized as a separate language in its own right rather than just a divergent Korean dialect. Korean, Jejuan, and a few extinct relatives form the Koreanic language family. Korean is agglutinative in its morphology and follows an subject-object-verb word order in its syntax.

== History ==
- Proto-Koreanic
  - Puyŏ languages
    - Ye-Maek language
    - Buyeo language
    - Goguryeo language
    - Baekje language
  - Han languages
    - Gaya language
    - Silla language
- Old Korean
- Middle Korean
- Modern Korean
  - Hangul orthography
  - New Korean Orthography

== Hangul ==
- Origin of Hangul
  - Hunminjeongeum
  - Hunminjeongeum Haerye
- Hangul consonant and vowel tables

=== Online ===
- Korean language and computers
  - ISO/TR 11941
  - Unified Hangul Code
- Hangul Day

=== In non-Korean languages ===
- Cia-Cia language
- Taiwanese Hangul

== Chinese characters ==
- Hanja
  - Idu script
    - Hyangchal
  - Gugyeol
  - Mixed script
- Hanmun

== Other language systems ==
- Korean Braille
- Korean Sign language
  - Korean manual alphabet

== Grammar ==
- Korean count word
- Korean numerals
- Korean postpositions
- Korean profanity
- Korean pronouns
- Korean punctuation
- Korean speech levels
- Korean verbs
- Korean phonology
- Korean honorifics

== Linguistics ==
- Korean phonology
- Linguistic purism in Korean

== Dialects and relatives ==
=== In Korea ===
==== North Korea ====
- North Korean standard language
- Hamgyŏng dialect
- Hwanghae dialect
- Pyongan dialect
- Yukjin dialect

==== South Korea ====
- South Korean standard language
- Chungcheong dialect
- Gangwon dialect
- Gyeonggi dialect
- Gyeongsang dialect
- Jeolla dialect

==== Jeju ====
- Jeju language

==== Outside Korea ====
- Zainichi Korean language
- Korean language in China
- Koryo-mar
- Korean as a foreign language

== Transliteration ==
=== Romanization ===
- McCune–Reischauer
- Revised Romanization of Korean
- Romanization of Korean (North Korean system)
- Yale romanization of Korean

=== Cyrillization ===
- Kontsevich

== Etymology ==
- List of Korean placename etymologies
- Sino-Korean vocabulary
- Konglish
- North–South differences in the Korean language

== Korean dictionaries ==
- Basic Korean Dictionary
- Hanja–Hangul dictionaries
- Standard Korean Language Dictionary

== Organizations and institutions ==
- International Circle of Korean Linguistics
- International Ideographs Core
- King Sejong Institute
- Korean Cultural Centers
- Hunminjeongeum Society
- Korean Language Society
- National Hangeul Museum
