= The Lake House (film) =

2006 film by Alejandro Agresti

- Theatrical release poster
- Directed by: Alejandro Agresti
- Written by: David Auburn
- Based on: Il Mare; 2000 film by Kim Eun-jeong and Kim Mi-yeong
- Produced by: Doug Davison; Roy Lee
- Starring: Keanu Reeves; Sandra Bullock; Dylan Walsh; Shohreh Aghdashloo; Christopher Plummer
- Cinematography: Alar Kivilo
- Edited by: Alejandro Brodersohn; Lynzee Klingman
- Music by: Rachel Portman
- Production companies: Village Roadshow Pictures; Vertigo Entertainment; Sidus Pictures
- Distributed by: Warner Bros. Pictures
- Release date: June 16, 2006
- Running time: 99 minutes
- Countries: United States; South Korea
- Language: English
- Budget: $40 million
- Box office: $114.8 million

The Lake House (released in Australia as The Magic Postbox) is a 2006 fantasy romance film directed by Alejandro Agresti and written by David Auburn. A remake of the 2000 South Korean film Il Mare, it stars Keanu Reeves and Sandra Bullock, who last appeared together in the 1994 action thriller film Speed. The film revolves around an architect (Reeves) living in 2004 and a doctor (Bullock) living in 2006 who meet via letters left in the mailbox of a lake house where they both lived at separate points in time. They carry on a two-year correspondence while remaining separated by the time difference.

== Plot ==
In 2006, physician Kate Forster leaves the lake house she has been renting near Chicago and starts a job at a downtown hospital. She leaves a note in the mailbox asking the next tenant to forward her mail and explaining that the painted pawprints on the front walkway were there when she moved in, as was the box in the attic.

Two years earlier, architect Alex Wyler moves into the same lake house and finds Kate's letter, which confuses him since he doesn't see any pawprints. While he restores the house, he befriends a dog who one day runs through paint, leaving the paw prints referenced in Kate's letter. He writes back, using the mailbox, asking how she knew about the paw prints since nobody had lived in the house prior to him. He also notices that the date on her letters is 2006.

While having lunch in Daley Plaza on Valentine's Day 2006, Kate witnesses a man hit by a car and tries but fails to save him. Depressed, she returns to the lake house and finds Alex's letter. They regularly exchange letters, raising the mailbox's red flag when they leave their response. Eventually, they learn that they are living two years apart, but can communicate through the mailbox almost instantly.

Kate asks Alex to find a copy of Jane Austen's Persuasion that she left at a train station, which he does, and Alex takes Kate on a tour of his favorite architecture in Chicago. Both eventually meet at a birthday party Kate's then boyfriend, an attorney named Morgan, throws for her. Despite sharing a kiss, Alex does not tell Kate about the letters.

Alex's narcissistic father, respected architect Simon Wyler, is hospitalized and dies. Kate finds a book of photos of Simon's work which has not been published yet in Alex's time that includes a photo of Simon and Alex as a little boy at the lake house. Not wanting him to wait until it comes out, she leaves it for him in the mailbox, hoping it will comfort him. The gesture convinces Alex and Kate that they should try to meet.

Alex makes a reservation at a restaurant two years in advance for him, but the next day for Kate. She arrives, but he never shows. Heartbroken, Kate ends their relationship and stops visiting the lake house to settle for a future with Morgan. Alex places their letters in a box in the house's attic, as she described in her first letter, and moves in with his brother Henry, also an architect. Alex tries to move on with his life, but never stops thinking about Kate.

On Valentine's Day, 2006 for Alex, he recalls Kate's mentioning Daley Plaza so hurries to the lake house to retrieve their letters. In 2008, Kate and Morgan meet with Henry, who they hired to design the renovations for a house they bought together.

When Kate asks about a drawing of the lake house displayed in Henry's office, Henry says it was drawn by his brother Alex. She realizes Henry's brother is her Alex, so she asks about him. Henry explains he died on that day two years earlier.

Realizing Alex was the man she failed to save at Daley Plaza, Kate rushes to the lake house herself and writes a frantic message to Alex begging him to wait two years and find her at the lake house. He does see her in Daley Plaza but stops himself from approaching her, having received her letter.

At the lake house, Kate is distraught, fearing she failed to save Alex, so collapses to her knees at the mailbox. The mailbox's red flag falls and a truck pulls up. Kate brightens when she sees it is Alex, alive and well. They share a passionate kiss and walk into the lake house together.

It has been 2 years for Kate (2006-2008), but 4 years for Alex (2004-2008).

== Cast ==
- Keanu Reeves as Alex Wyler, a young architect who designs suburban condominiums. He has a strained relationship with his father Simon, a renowned but egocentric architect. Alex moves into the lake house even though he hates its impractical design.
- Sandra Bullock as Dr. Kate Forster, a physician who starts a new job at the Chicago hospital. She is the former tenant of the lake house. Her boyfriend is Morgan, whom she subsequently becomes engaged to and then breaks up with.
- Christopher Plummer as Simon Wyler, Alex's estranged, narcissistic father. He is a famous Chicago architect and the original designer of the lake house.
- Ebon Moss-Bachrach as Henry Wyler, Alex's brother. He eventually opens his own architectural firm, Visionary Vanguard Associates.
- Shohreh Aghdashloo as Dr. Anna Klyczynski, Kate's older boss, mentor, and friend.
- Dylan Walsh as Morgan Price, Kate's boyfriend turned fiancé. He is pushy and persistent, and tends to make decisions for Kate. She eventually breaks up with him.
- Willeke van Ammelrooy as Mrs. Forster, Kate's mother and confidante.
- Lynn Collins as Mona, Alex's assistant who is romantically interested in him. He is indifferent to her constant advances.

== Production ==
Filmed and set in Chicago, production began in March 2005. The lake house itself was built on Maple Lake, located within the Palos Forest Preserves off of 95th Street in the southwest suburb of Chicago, Willow Springs. The house was actually built on dry land and then flooded to appear that it was in the lake. After filming, the house was required to be removed, and a simple fishing dock was put in its place. The downtown scenes are in The Loop. The scenes where Kate and Morgan go to Henry's office, and Kate's dramatic exit down the stairs, were filmed at the Chicago Architecture Foundation. The scene where Henry and Alex talk on the street after being in their father's office was filmed on the 400 block of South Michigan Ave, in front of the Fine Arts Building and the Auditorium Theater. The scene where Alex and Simon converse in Simon's home was filmed at the Prairie Avenue Bookshop, an architectural bookstore in Chicago which closed in 2009. Other filming locations include Aurora, Illinois (now the Madison Park community) and Riverside, Illinois, a suburb west of Chicago that is known for its historic houses, and several Frank Lloyd Wright buildings. The railway station in the movie is the real station of Riverside, and the bridge that Alex crosses while chasing Jack is called the "Swinging Bridge"; it crosses the Des Plaines River located in Lyons, IL. The scene where Kate gets stood up is in Millennium Park at the Park Grill. The bar scene in the Loop where Kate is seen sitting on the barstool, speaking with the woman at the wooden bar, is the real "Millers Pub" located at 134 S Wabash Ave, Chicago, IL 60603.

== Music ==
An original motion picture soundtrack featuring songs used in the film, as well as a selection of original score cues composed and produced by Rachel Portman, was released digitally and in physical format on June 20, 2006, through Lakeshore Records in the United States. The score was orchestrated by Jeff Atmajian, with David Snell as conductor, and features strings, piano, guitar, and cello in its instrumentation. Recording and mixing was handled by Chris Dibble—with assistance from Jeremy Murphy—in London, with the former taking place at Air Studios in Lyndhurst, and the latter at Lansdowne Recording Studios.

The Lake House: Original Motion Picture Soundtrack
No.	Title	Artist	Length
1.	"This Never Happened Before"	Paul McCartney	3:26
2.	"(I Can't Seem To) Make You Mine"	The Clientele	3:38
3.	"Time Has Told Me"	Nick Drake	4:26
4.	"Ant Farm"	Eels	2:13
5.	"It's Too Late"	Carole King	3:57
6.	"The Lakehouse"	Rachel Portman	3:17
7.	"Pawprints"	Portman	1:21
8.	"Tough Week"	Portman	1:09
9.	"Mailbox"	Portman	0:59
10.	"Sunsets"	Portman	5:01
11.	"Alex's Father"	Portman	6:46
12.	"Il Mare"	Portman	3:00
13.	"Tell Me More"	Portman	2:23
14.	"She's Gone"	Portman	1:15
15.	"Wait For Me"	Portman	3:02
16.	"You Waited"	Portman	1:38
17.	"I Waited"	Portman	1:41
Total length:			49:12

Several other songs appeared in the film, but were not included on the soundtrack:

- "I Wish You Love" – Rosemary Clooney
- "There Will Never Be Another You" – Rosemary Clooney
- "Pink Moon" – Nick Drake
- "La noyée" – Carla Bruni
- "Sentimental Tattoo" – Jukebox Junkies
- "Chiamami Adesso" – Paolo Conte
- "When It Rains" – Brad Mehldau
- "Young at Heart" – Brad Mehldau
- "Almost Like Being in Love" – Gerry Mulligan
- "O Pato" – Stan Getz
- "A Man and a Woman" – Sir Julian
- "Bitter" – Meshell Ndegeocello

"Somewhere Only We Know" by Keane was used in the film's teaser trailer, theatrical trailer, and TV spot.

=== Reception ===
Professional ratings
Review scores
Source	Rating
AllMusic	3.5/5 stars
Filmtracks.com	3/5 stars
Movie Wave	4/5 stars
Soundtrack.Net	3.5/5 stars

Reviewing for AllMusic, Thom Jurek wrote that Portman "nails it once more" with her use of "elegiac strings and impressionistic piano" to match the "soft" seasonal scenes and "subdued tones in the film's frames", the "relatively low-key performances" of both leads, and the "languid changes" of the plot, noting that the theme of longing present in the film "is used as an almost painterly device to hold the music inside". He further stated, "There is an ache in this music, proposed by the notion of absence rather than sheer loneliness. Something is missing, and Portman's score brings back this feeling again and again". Jurek cited the composer's "use of space in allowing a cello to unravel in the lyric line" on "Pawprints" and "Il Mare" as a "beautiful device for revelation".

Brian McVicker of Soundtrack.Net also gave the album a favourable review and rated it 3.5 out of 5 stars, writing that the "song[s] and score work well in conjunction with each other, keeping a consistent tone from start to finish". He described the first five tracks as "winning, pleasant, low key offerings" and Portman's score as "an understated but lovely and engaging effort".

== Release ==
=== Box office ===
In its opening weekend, the film grossed $13.6 million and ranked fourth in the United States box office behind Cars, Nacho Libre and The Fast and the Furious: Tokyo Drift. By October 1, 2006, it had grossed $52,330,111 in the US and $114,830,111 worldwide.

=== Critical response ===
The Lake House received mixed reviews from critics. On review aggregator website Rotten Tomatoes, the film has an approval rating of 35% based on reviews from 157 critics, with a weighted average score of 5.00/10. The site's critical consensus states: "The plot of The Lake House is a little too convoluted, and the film fails to pull off the sweeping romance it aims for." On Metacritic, it has a weighted average score of 52 out of 100 based on 34 critics, indicating "mixed or average reviews". Audiences polled by CinemaScore gave the film an average grade of "B" on an A+ to F scale.

Roger Ebert gave the film its most positive review—he rated it 3.5 out of 4 stars—and felt that it succeeded despite being based on the impossible paradoxes established in the plot, saying that what he responded to was "its fundamental romantic impulse [that] makes us hope these two people will meet somehow". Addressing the film's logical inconsistencies, Ebert said he was not "bothered in the slightest" as "[a] time travel story works on emotional, not temporal, logic". He praised Bullock and Reeves in their respective roles, noting that a "great deal depends on the personalities involved", and called both "enormously likeable". The New York Times's A. O. Scott described the film as "wondrously illogical" and "completely preposterous, [but] not without charm". Echoing similar sentiments to Ebert, he noted that the film falls apart if "approach[ed] with a rational, skeptical mind", but felt that Auburn's script and Agresti's direction "smoothly handled" the "contrivances of the plot". He also expressed appreciation for the film's aesthetic, commenting that it was "elegant without being terribly showy, with a connoisseur's eye for Chicago's architectural glories". Scott concluded that overall the film is "a showcase for its stars, who seem gratifyingly comfortable in their own skin and delighted to be in each other's company again".

Claudia Puig, writing for USA Today, said that The Lake House was "one of the more befuddling movies of recent years", and felt its premise "made no sense, no matter how you turn it around in your head. It attempts to be a romance, a time-traveling mystery and a meditation on loneliness. It doesn't succeed at any of the three". She further called it a "melodramatic romance" that "moves at a glacial pace" while also "tak[ing] itself too seriously", and concluded by saying that "Even if we suspend disbelief completely, The Lake House is unconvincing, unsatisfying and unmoving". Puig did acknowledge the chemistry between Reeves and Bullock, but noted that their moments together in the film were rare. Stax of IGN described the film as a "terminally slow, talky and surprisingly uneventful affair" that "never capitalizes on the magic that brings Kate and Alex together". He criticized the "contrived 'beat the clock' element" in the plot that "allow[ed] the characters to cheat fate", but failed to prove to the audience why they love each other and how they "complete" one another, as well as Reeves's monotonous cadence throughout the film, and said Bullock's acting was "disenchanted, almost blase... [f]or a woman supposedly deeply in love with a man she can't have". He did concede there were "a few fleeting moments of levity where the film comes alive", but felt things were "so turgid and lethargically paced that even the leads seem bored most of the time", ultimately declaring the film "boring" and "devoid of passion". He gave it a 2.5 out of 5 stars rating. (Note: IGN used star ratings out of 5 at the time. The site later revised the score to 5 out of 10.)

The OC Register's David Germain called the film a "tear-jerker whose convolutions elicit more chuckles than tears" and said it "would have been nice" if the DVD had included "commentary from the filmmakers so someone could explain the ridiculous lapses in logic" in response to its containing seven deleted scenes.

=== Accolades ===
The film received a nomination for Choice Liplock (between Bullock and Reeves) at the 2006 Teen Choice Awards and won.

=== Home media ===
The Lake House was released on DVD, Blu-ray Disc and HD DVD on September 26, 2006, by Warner Home Video. It was the first film to be simultaneously released on all three formats on the same day, and Warner became the first studio to issue a title in this manner. The single-disc DVD was initially available for region 1 territories only, in both widescreen and full-screen editions with 480i resolution—a region 2 compatible version was later released on October 9. Special features included deleted scenes, outtakes, and the film's theatrical trailer. The Blu-ray edition was a region-free single-disc release, with 1080i resolution and the same extras as its DVD counterpart.
