= When It Rains =

When It Rains may refer to:

== Music ==
- When It Rains (album), by the Spoiled, or the title song, 2026
- When It Rains, an album by Silent Screams, or the title song, 2011
- "When It Rains" (Brad Mehldau song), 2002
- "When It Rains" (Eli Young Band song), 2007
- "When It Rains", a song by Bebe Rexha from Bebe, 2023
- "When It Rains", a song by Paramore from Riot!, 2007

== Television and film ==
- "When It Rains...", an episode of Star Trek: Deep Space Nine
- "When It Rains" (Steven Universe), a television episode
- When It Rains, a 1995 short film directed by Charles Burnett

== See also ==
- "When It Rain", a 2016 song by Danny Brown
- When It Rains, It Pours (disambiguation)
- "When It Rains It Snows", a song by They Might Be Giants on the compilation album Miscellaneous T
