= Iksop Lee =

South Korean linguist (born 1938)

- Born: 1938 (age 87–88); Gangneung, Korea, Empire of Japan
- Citizenship: South Korea
- Education: Seoul National University (BA, PhD)
- Occupation: Linguist

Korean name
- Hangul: 이익섭
- Hanja: 李翊燮
- RR: I Ikseop
- MR: I Iksŏp

Iksop Lee (Note: This spelling for his name comes from his 2000 book with S. Robert Ramsey, The Korean Language.) (Korean: 이익섭; born 1938) is a South Korean linguist.

== Biography ==
Lee was born in 1938 in Gangneung, Korea, Empire of Japan. He received his Bachelor of Arts from the Department of Korean Language and Literature of Seoul National University (SNU). He received his PhD in literature from there as well. From 1963 to 1969, he was an assistant professor at Jeonbuk National University. From 1969 to 2003, he was a professor at the Department of Korean Language and Literature at SNU. He retired that year, although he continued researching and publishing.

He was a visiting scholar at the Harvard–Yenching Institute from 1976 to 1977 and at University of Maryland, College Park in 1996.

From 1996 to 1997, he served as the president of the Korean Language Society. From 1997 to 1999, he served as director of the National Institute of Korean Language.

In 2011, he began compiling a dictionary of the dialect in Gangneung. He published the Gangneung Dialect Materials Dictionary (강릉방언 자료사전) in 2022.
