= Korean profanity =

- Hangul: 욕
- Hanja: 辱
- Revised Romanization: yok
- McCune–Reischauer: yok

The Korean language has a number of words that are considered profanity (Korean: 욕; RR: yok).

== List ==
- 개새끼; gaesaekki: Noun. Equivalent to the English phrase "son of a bitch". Combination of the word 개; gae, meaning dog, and the word 새끼; saekki, meaning offspring or young.
- 걸레 같은 년; geolle gateun nyeon: Noun. Used similarly to words such as "whore" or "slut". The adjective 걸레 같은; geolle gateun) means "rag-like" (meaning whore-like) and the phrase 걸레 같은 년 translates literally to "a bitch who is like a rag" and refers to women who are promiscuous and thus, dirty and tattered/worn out/used up like a rag. The phrase can be abbreviated in use as 걸레년; geollenyeon.
- 꺼져; kkeojeo: Interjection. Similar to "get lost" in English
- 기집애; gijibae: a colloquial way of saying "계집애" A borderline word used for women/girls only. When close to someone, it's a term of affection meaning "brat" or girl I'm close to. When distant, it's a fighting word closer to "bitch".
- 년; nyeon: Noun. Female version of 놈. A female person in a degrading/derogatory manner: "bitch".
- 놈; nom: Noun. A male person in a degrading/derogatory manner
- 느갭; neugaep: Interjection. A variation on 느금마; neugeumma but for fathers. Variations include 느그 애비; neugeu aebi, 느개비; neugaebi
- 느금마; neugeumma: Interjection. Means "your mother [is a prostitute]". Variations include 니 애미; ni aemi, 너희 어머니; neohui eomeoni, 너검마; neogeomma, 니 엄마; ni eomma
- 또라이; ttorai: Noun. Someone with a mental condition
- 미친놈/미친년; michinnom/michinnyeon: Noun. Translates literally to "crazy bastard/bitch". A combination of the adjective 미친; michin, which translates to crazy or insane, and the word 놈; nom or 년; nyeon
- 병신; 病身; byeongsin: Noun. Roughly "moron" or "retard". It is a compound of the word 병; 病; byeong, meaning "of disease" or "diseased", and the word 신; 身; sin, a word meaning "body" originating from the Chinese character. This word originally refers to disabled individuals, but in modern Korean is commonly used as an insult with meanings varying contextually from "jerk" to "dumbass" or "dickhead"
- 보지; boji or 씹; ssip: Noun. A vagina or woman
- 새끼; saekki: Noun. A noun used to derogatorily refer to any general person. The word, when not used as a profanity, is used to describe a young of an animal
- 씨발; ssibal: Adjective (similar to "fucking") or interjection ("fuck!"). The word originates from an archaic verb 씹하다 which originally meant "to have sex"
- 엠창; emchang: Interjection. "Your mother is a prostitute". 엠 is a slang term for "mother". 창 means 창녀; changnyeo, which means prostitute
- 엿 먹어; yeot meogeo: Interjection. Literally means to "Eat yeot". Used similarly to "fuck you"
- 젠장; jenjang: Interjection. Shit, goddamn, damn it
- 좆; jot: Noun or adjective. Means "penis".
- 지랄; jiral: Verb. Means to talk incessantly and nonsensically. The word originates from the word 지랄병; 지랄病; jiralbyeong), an archaic and outdated word, generically encompassing a number of separate neurological disorders with similar symptoms such as seizures, tics and spasms
- 썅; ssyang: Interjection or adjective. Either exclamation used to express displeasure, or prefix of nyeon or nom to insult somebody.
