= When It Rains, It Pours =

When It Rains, It Pours may refer to:

- "When It Rains, It Pours" (30 Rock), a television episode
- "When It Rains It Pours" (song), by Luke Combs
- "When It Rains It Pours" (Tokio Hotel song), by Tokio Hotel
- "When It Rains It Pours", a song by 50 Cent from the Get Rich or Die Tryin' soundtrack
- "When it rains, it pours", a slogan used by the American company Morton Salt

== See also ==
- "When It Rains, It Really Pours", a song by Billy "The Kid" Emerson, covered by Elvis Presley
- When It Rains (disambiguation)
- "When It Rains It Snows", a song by They Might Be Giants on the compilation album Miscellaneous T
