= Korean language =

Language spoken in Korea

Korean
- 한국어 (Hangugeo) (South Korea) 조선어 (Chosŏnŏ) (North Korea)
- Hangugeo written (left) vertically in Korean alphabet for South Korean and Chosŏnŏ written (right) for North Korean when referring to the language
- Region: Korea, Northeast China
- Ethnicity: Koreans, formerly Jaegaseung
- Native speakers: 81 million (2019–2022)
- Language family: Koreanic: Korean
- Early forms: Proto-Koreanic: Old Korean; Middle Korean; Early Modern Korean
- Standard forms: Pyojuneo (South Korea); Munhwaŏ (North Korea)
- Dialects: See Korean dialects
- Writing system: Hangul; Korean mixed script (archaic; limited use in south); Hanja (obsolete: Idu, Hyangchal and Gugyeol)

Official status
- Official language in: North Korea; South Korea
- Recognised minority language in: Yanbian Prefecture and Changbai County (China)
- Regulated by: In South Korea: National Institute of Korean Language; In North Korea: The Language Research Institute, Academy of Social Science; In China: China Korean Language Regulatory Commission

Language codes
- ISO 639-1: ko
- ISO 639-2: kor
- ISO 639-3: kor
- Glottolog: kore1280
- Linguasphere: 45-AAA-a

South Korean name
- Hangul: 한국어
- Hanja: 韓國語
- RR: Hangugeo
- MR: Han'gugŏ
- IPA: [ha(ː)n.ɡu.ɡʌ]

North Korean name
- Hangul: 조선어
- Hanja: 朝鮮語
- RR: Joseoneo
- MR: Chosŏnŏ
- IPA: [tso.sɔ.nɔ]

Korean is a Koreanic language native to Korea, which makes up the majority of the language's 81 million speakers. (Note: Measured as of 2020. The estimated 2020 combined population of North and South Korea was about 77 million.) It is the official language of both North Korea and South Korea. In the south, the language is known as Hangugeo (South Korean: 한국어), and in the north, it is known as Chosŏnŏ (North Korean: 조선어). Since the turn of the 21st century, Korean popular culture has spread around the world through globalization and cultural exports. Korean uses the Hangul alphabet.

Beyond Korea the language is recognized as a minority language in parts of China, namely Jilin, and specifically Yanbian Prefecture, and Changbai County. It is also spoken by Sakhalin Koreans in parts of Sakhalin, the Russian island just north of Japan, and by the Koryo-saram in parts of Central Asia. The Jeju language of Jeju Island is closely related but not mutually intelligible with Korean. Together with a few extinct relatives they form the compact Koreanic language family. The linguistic homeland of Korean is suggested to be somewhere in modern Manchuria. The hierarchy of the society from which the language originates deeply influences the language, leading to a system of speech levels and honorifics indicative of the formality of any given situation.

Modern Korean is written in the Korean script (한글; Hangeul in South Korea, 조선글; Chosŏn'gŭl in North Korea), an alphabet system developed during the 15th century for that purpose, although it did not become the primary script until the mid 20th century. (Hanja and mixed script were the primary script until then.) The script uses 24 basic letters (jamo) and 27 complex letters formed from the basic ones.

Interest in Korean language acquisition (as a foreign language) has been generated by longstanding alliances, military involvement and diplomacy, such as between South Korea–United States and China–North Korea since the end of World War II and the Korean War. Along with other languages such as the Chinese languages and Arabic, Korean is ranked at the top difficulty level for English speakers by the United States Department of Defense.

== History ==
Modern Korean descends from Middle Korean, which in turn descends from Old Korean, which descends from the Proto-Koreanic language, which is generally suggested to have its linguistic homeland somewhere in Manchuria. Whitman (2012) suggests that the proto-Koreans, already present in northern Korea, expanded into the southern part of the Korean Peninsula in around 300 BC and coexisted with the descendants of the Japonic Mumun cultivators (or assimilated them). Both had influence on each other and a later founder effect diminished the internal variety of both language families.

Since the establishment of two independent governments, North–South differences have developed in standard Korean, including variations in pronunciation and vocabulary chosen. While there tends to be strong political conflict between North and South Korea regarding these linguistic "differences", regional dialects within each country actually display greater linguistic variations than those found between North and South Korean standards. Nevertheless, these dialects remain largely mutually intelligible.

=== Writing systems ===
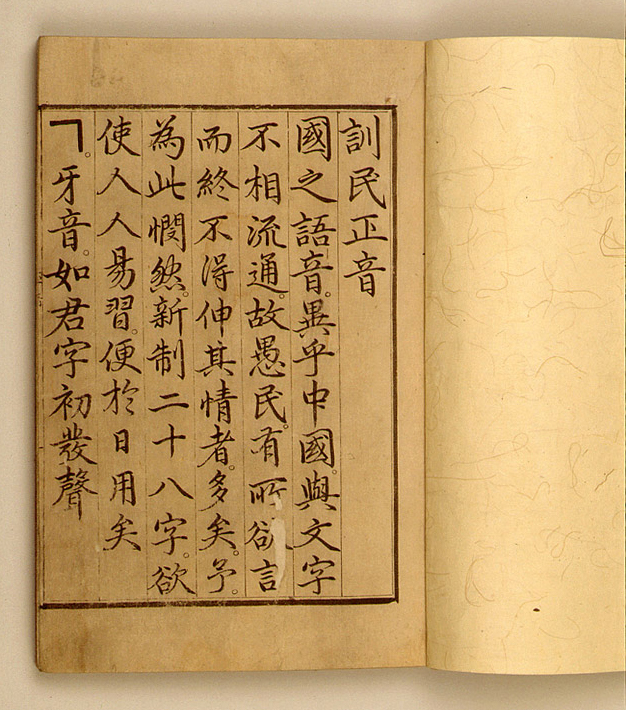
King Sejong's proclamation of the Hangul script, written in Classical Chinese

The Chinese language, written with Chinese characters and read with Sino-Xenic pronunciations, was introduced to Korea in the 1st century BC and remained the medium of formal writing and government until the late 19th century. Korean scholars adapted Chinese characters (known in Korean as Hanja) to write their own language, creating scripts known as idu, hyangchal, gugyeol and gakpil. These systems were cumbersome owing to the fundamental disparities between the Korean and Chinese languages and accessible only to those educated in classical Chinese. Most of the population was illiterate.

In the 15th century King Sejong the Great personally developed an alphabetic featural writing system, known today as Hangul, to promote literacy among the common people. Introduced in the document Hunminjeongeum, it was called eonmun ('colloquial script') and quickly spread nationwide to increase literacy in Korea.

The Korean alphabet was denounced by the yangban aristocracy, who looked down upon it for being too easy to learn. However it gained widespread use among the common class and was widely used to print popular novels, which were enjoyed by the common class. Since few people could understand official documents written in classical Chinese, Korean kings sometimes released public notices written entirely in Hangul as early as the 16th century for all Korean classes, including uneducated peasants and slaves. By the 17th century the yangban had exchanged Hangul letters with slaves, which suggests a high literacy rate of Hangul during the Joseon era.

In the context of growing Korean nationalism in the 19th century the Kabo Reform of 1894 abolished the Confucian examinations and decreed that government documents would be issued in Hangul instead of literary Chinese. Some newspapers were published in Hangul, but other publications used Korean mixed script, with Hanja for Sino-Korean vocabulary and Hangul for other elements. North Korea abolished Hanja in writing in 1949 but continues to teach it in schools. Its usage in South Korea is mainly reserved for specific circumstances such as newspapers, scholarly papers and disambiguation. Today Hanja is largely unused in everyday life but is still important for historical and linguistic studies.

== Names ==
The Korean names for the language are based on the names for Korea used in both South Korea and North Korea. The English word "Korean" is derived from Goryeo, which is thought to be the first Korean dynasty known to Western nations. Korean people in the former USSR refer to themselves as Koryo-saram or Koryo-in (literally, 'Koryo/Goryeo people'), and call the language Koryo-mar. Some older English sources also use the spelling "Corea" to refer to the nation, and its inflected form for the language, culture and people; the "Korea" spelling experienced a sharp rise in popularity during the 1890s, being de facto standardized by 1907.

In South Korea the Korean language is referred to by many names including hangugeo ('Korean language'), hangungmal ('Korean speech') and urimal ('our language'); "hanguk" is taken from the name of the Korean Empire (대한제국; 大韓帝國; Daehan Jeguk). The "han" (韓) in Hanguk and Daehan Jeguk is derived from Samhan, in reference to the Three Kingdoms of Korea (not the ancient confederacies in the southern Korean Peninsula), while "-eo" and "-mal" mean "language" and "speech", respectively. Korean is also simply referred to as gugeo, literally "national language". This name is based on the same Han characters (國語 'nation' + 'language') that are also used in Taiwan and Japan to refer to their respective national languages.

In North Korea and China, the language is most often called Joseonmal, or more formally, Joseoneo. This is taken from the North Korean name for Korea (Joseon), a name retained from the Joseon period until the proclamation of the Korean Empire, which in turn was annexed by the Empire of Japan.

In mainland China, following the establishment of diplomatic relations with South Korea in 1992, the term Cháoxiǎnyǔ or the short form Cháoyǔ has normally been used to refer to the standard language of North Korea and Yanbian, whereas Hánguóyǔ or the short form Hányǔ is used to refer to the standard language of South Korea.

== Classification ==
Korean is a member of the Koreanic family along with the Jeju language. Some linguists have included it in the Altaic family, but the core Altaic proposal itself has lost most of its prior support. The Khitan language has several vocabulary items similar to Korean that are not found in other Mongolian or Tungusic languages, suggesting a Korean influence on Khitan.

The hypothesis that Korean could be related to Japanese has had some supporters due to some overlap in vocabulary and similar grammatical features that have been elaborated upon by such researchers as Samuel E. Martin and Roy Andrew Miller. Sergei Starostin (1991) found about 25% of potential cognates in the Japanese–Korean 100-word Swadesh list. Some linguists concerned with the issue between Japanese and Korean, including Alexander Vovin, have argued that the indicated similarities are not due to any genetic relationship, but rather to a sprachbund effect and heavy borrowing, especially from Ancient Korean into Western Old Japanese. A good example might be Middle Korean sàm and Japanese asá, meaning 'hemp'. This word seems to be a cognate, but although it is well attested in Western Old Japanese and Northern Ryukyuan languages, in Eastern Old Japanese it only occurs in compounds, and it is only present in three dialects of the Southern Ryukyuan language group. Also, the doublet wo meaning 'hemp' is attested in Western Old Japanese and Southern Ryukyuan languages. It is thus plausible to assume a borrowed term.

Hudson & Robbeets (2020) suggested that there are traces of a pre-Nivkh substratum in Korean. According to the hypothesis, ancestral varieties of Nivkh (also known as Amuric) were once distributed on the Korean Peninsula before the arrival of Koreanic speakers.

== Phonology ==
Spoken Korean (adult man): 구매자는 판매자에게 제품 대금으로 20달러를 지급하여야 한다. gumaejaneun panmaejaege jepum daegeumeuro isip dalleoreul ($20) jigeuphayeoya handa. "The buyer must pay the seller $20 for the product." lit. [the buyer] [to the seller] [the product] [in payment] [twenty dollars] [have to pay] [do]

Korean syllable structure is (C)(G)V(C), consisting of an optional onset consonant, glide /j, w, ɰ/ and final coda /p, t, k, m, n, ŋ, l/ surrounding a core vowel.

=== Consonants ===
		Bilabial	Alveolar	Alveolo- palatal	Velar	Glottal
Nasal		ㅁ /m/	ㄴ /n/		ㅇ /ŋ/ (Note: only at the end of a syllable)	
Plosive/ Affricate	plain	ㅂ /p/	ㄷ /t/	ㅈ /t͡s/ (Note: Pyongyang) or /t͡ɕ/ (Note: Seoul)	ㄱ /k/	
Plosive/ Affricate	tense	ㅃ /p͈/	ㄸ /t͈/	ㅉ /t͡s͈/ or /t͡ɕ͈/	ㄲ /k͈/	
Plosive/ Affricate	aspirated	ㅍ /pʰ/	ㅌ /tʰ/	ㅊ /t͡sʰ/ or /t͡ɕʰ/	ㅋ /kʰ/	
Fricative	plain			ㅅ /s/ or [ɕ]		ㅎ /h/
Fricative	tense			ㅆ /s͈/ or [ɕ͈]		
Approximant		/w/ (Note: The semivowels /w/ and /j/ are represented in Korean writing by modifications to vowel symbols (see below).)		/j/		
Liquid			ㄹ /l/ or /ɾ/			

==== Assimilation and allophony ====
The IPA symbol ⟨◌͈⟩ (U+0348 ◌͈ COMBINING DOUBLE VERTICAL LINE BELOW) is used to denote the tensed consonants /p͈/, /t͈/, /k͈/, /t͡ɕ͈/, /s͈/. Its official use in the extensions to the IPA is for "strong" articulation, but is used in the literature for faucalized voice. The Korean consonants also have elements of stiff voice, but it is not yet known how typical this is of faucalized consonants. They are produced with a partially constricted glottis and additional subglottal pressure in addition to tense vocal tract walls, laryngeal lowering, or other expansion of the larynx.

/s/ is aspirated [sʰ] and becomes an alveolo-palatal [ɕʰ] before [j] or [i] for most speakers (but see North–South differences in the Korean language). This occurs with the tense fricative and all the affricates as well. At the end of an utterance, /s/ changes to /t/ (example: beoseot (버섯) 'mushroom').

/h/ may become a bilabial [ɸ] before [o] or [u], a palatal [ç] before [j] or [i], a velar [x] before [ɯ], a voiced [ɦ] between voiced sounds, and a [h] elsewhere.

/p, t, t͡ɕ, k/ become voiced [b, d, d͡ʑ, ɡ] between voiced sounds.

/m, n/ frequently denasalize at the beginnings of words.

/l/ becomes alveolar flap [ɾ] between vowels, and [l] or [ɭ] at the end of a syllable or next to another /l/. A written syllable-final 'ㄹ', when followed by a vowel or a glide (i.e., when the next character starts with 'ㅇ'), migrates to the next syllable and thus becomes [ɾ].

Traditionally, /l/ was disallowed at the beginning of a word. It disappeared before [j], and otherwise became /n/. However, the inflow of western loanwords changed the trend, and now word-initial /l/ (mostly from English loanwords) are pronounced as a free variation of either [ɾ] or [l].

All obstruents (plosives, affricates, fricatives) at the end of a word are pronounced with no audible release, [p̚, t̚, k̚].

Plosive sounds /p, t, k/ become nasals [m, n, ŋ] before nasal sounds.

Hangul spelling does not reflect these assimilatory pronunciation rules, but rather maintains the underlying, partly historical morphology. Given this, it is sometimes hard to tell which actual phonemes are present in a certain word.

The traditional prohibition of word-initial /ɾ/ became a morphological rule called "initial law" (두음법칙) in the pronunciation standards of South Korea, which pertains to Sino-Korean vocabulary. Such words retain their word-initial /ɾ/ in the pronunciation standards of North Korea. For example,

- "labor" (勞動) – north: rodong (로동), south: nodong (노동)
- "history" (歷史) – north: ryeoksa (력사), south: yeoksa (역사)
- "female" (女子) – north: nyeoja (녀자), south: yeoja (여자)

=== Vowels ===
Short vowel chart

Long vowel chart

The standard Korean monophthongs and their pronunciation principles are as follows:

Monophthongs	ㅏ /a/^{[A]} ㅓ /ʌ/ or /ə/^{[B]} ㅗ /o/ ㅜ /u/ ㅡ /ɯ/ ㅣ /i/ /e/ ㅔ, /ɛ/ ㅐ, /ø/ ㅚ, /y/ ㅟ
Vowels preceded by intermediaries, or diphthongs	ㅑ /ja/ ㅕ /jʌ/ or /jə/ ㅛ /jo/ ㅠ /ju/ /je/ ㅖ, /jɛ/ ㅒ, /we/ ㅞ, /wɛ/ ㅙ, /wa/ ㅘ, /ɰi/ ㅢ, /wʌ/ ㅝ

^[A] ㅏ is closer to a near-open central vowel ([ɐ]), though ⟨a⟩ is still used for tradition.

^[B] ㅓ is generally pronounced as [ə] when it becomes a long vowel.

However, in Korea, with the exception of older generations in certain regions, most people neither pronounce nor distinguish clearly between the two monophthongs 'ㅐ' (ae) and 'ㅔ' (e). Similarly, 'ㅟ' and 'ㅚ' are sometimes pronounced as [ɥi] and [we] respectively. The demographic that maintains monophthongal realizations of 'ㅟ' and 'ㅚ' is reportedly limited to elderly speakers in the Gyeonggi, Gangwon, and Chungcheong provinces. The official standard pronunciation guidelines acknowledge this variation by permitting both monophthongal and diphthongal pronunciations of these vowels.

In South Korea, whilst the distinction between long and short vowels is not clearly pronounced in modern speech, the distinction is maintained in standard language norms for reasons of tradition and semantic differentiation.

=== Morphophonemics ===
Grammatical morphemes may change shape depending on the preceding sounds. Examples include -eun/-neun (-은/-는) and -i/-ga (-이/-가).

Sometimes sounds may be inserted instead. Examples include -eul/-reul (-을/-를), -euro/-ro (-으로/-로), -eseo/-seo (-에서/-서), -ideunji/-deunji (-이든지/-든지) and -iya/-ya (-이야/-야).

- However, -euro/-ro is somewhat irregular, since it will behave differently after a ㄹ (rieul consonant).

Korean particles
After a consonant	After a ㄹ (rieul)	After a vowel
-ui (-의)
-eun (-은)		-neun (-는)
-i (-이)		-ga (-가)
-eul (-을)		-reul (-를)
-gwa (-과)		-wa (-와)
-euro (-으로)	-ro (-로)	

Some verbs may also change shape morphophonemically.

== Grammar ==
Korean is an agglutinative language. The Korean language is traditionally considered to have nine parts of speech. Modifiers generally precede the modified words and in the case of verb modifiers can be serially appended. The sentence structure or basic form of a Korean sentence is subject–object–verb (SOV), but the verb is the only required and immovable element and word order is highly flexible, as in many other agglutinative languages.

Question

가게에 가셨어요?
gage-e ga-syeoss-eo-yo)
store-LOC go-HON.PAST-CONJ-POL
'Did [you] go to the store?'

Response

예/네.
ye/ne
AFF
'yes.'

The relationship between a speaker/writer and their subject and audience is paramount in Korean grammar. The relationship between the speaker/writer and subject referent is reflected in honorifics, whereas that between speaker/writer and audience is reflected in speech level.

=== Honorifics ===
When talking about someone superior in status, a speaker or writer usually uses special nouns or verb endings to indicate the subject's superiority. Generally someone is superior in status if they are an older relative, a stranger of roughly equal or greater age, or an employer, teacher, customer, or the like. Someone is equal or inferior in status if they are a younger stranger, student, employee, or the like. Nowadays special endings can be used on declarative, interrogative and imperative sentences and both honorific and normal sentences.

Honorifics in traditional Korea were strictly hierarchical. The caste and estate systems possessed patterns and usages much more complex and stratified than those used today. The intricate structure of the Korean honorific system flourished in traditional culture and society. Honorifics in contemporary Korea are now used for people who are psychologically distant. Honorifics are also used for people who are superior in status, such as older people, teachers and employers.

=== Speech levels ===
There are seven verb paradigms or speech levels in Korean, and each level has its own unique set of verb endings which are used to indicate the level of formality of a situation. Unlike honorifics—which are used to show respect towards the referent (the person spoken of)—speech levels are used to show respect towards a speaker's or writer's audience (the person spoken to). The names of the seven levels are derived from the non-honorific imperative form of the verb 하다 (hada, "do") in each level, plus the suffix 체 (che, Hanja: 體), which means "style".

The three levels with high politeness (very formally polite, formally polite, casually polite) are generally grouped together as jondaenmal (존댓말), whereas the two levels with low politeness (formally impolite, casually impolite) are banmal (반말) in Korean. The remaining two levels (neutral formality with neutral politeness, high formality with neutral politeness) are neither polite nor impolite. In Korea, adults of same age often use polite language when they meet for the first time. They also use polite language in formal events such as presentations or public speeches. In workspace, employees often use polite language each other to show respect. Even if the manager is younger than an employee, employee still use polite language because of their position.

Nowadays younger-generation speakers no longer feel obliged to lower their usual regard toward the referent. It is common to see younger people talk to their older relatives with banmal. This is not out of disrespect but instead shows the intimacy and the closeness of the relationship between the two speakers. Transformations in social structures and attitudes in today's rapidly changing society have brought about change in the way people speak. Some young Korean speakers also mix polite and casual speech to express closeness while maintaining respect, especially in developing romantic relationships.

== Vocabulary ==
"Chosŏnŏ Sajeon", an early Korean dictionary (1920)

The core of the Korean vocabulary is made up of native Korean words. However, a significant proportion of the vocabulary, especially words that denote abstract ideas, are Sino-Korean words. To a much lesser extent, some words have also been borrowed from Mongolian and other languages. More recent loanwords are dominated by English.

In South Korea, it is widely believed that North Korea wanted to emphasize the use of unique Korean expressions in its language and eliminate the influence of foreign languages. However, according to researchers such as Jeon Soo-tae, who has seen first-hand data from North Korea, the country has reduced the number of difficult foreign words in a similar way to South Korea.

In 2021, Moon Sung-guk of Kim Il Sung University in North Korea wrote in his thesis that Kim Jong Il had said that vernacularized Sino-Korean vocabulary should be used as it is, not modified. "A language is in constant interaction with other languages, and in the process it is constantly being developed and enriched," he said. According to the paper, Kim Jong Il argued that academic terms used in the natural sciences and engineering, such as 콤퓨터 (k'omp'yut'ŏ; 'computer') and 하드디스크 (hadŭdisŭk'ŭ; 'hard disk') should remain in the names of their inventors, and that the word 쵸콜레트 (ch'ok'ollet'ŭ; 'chocolate') should not be replaced because it had been used for so long.

South Korea defines its vocabulary standards through the 표준국어대사전 (Standard Korean Language Dictionary), and North Korea defines its vocabulary standards through the 조선말대사전 (Korean Language Dictionary).

=== Sino-Korean ===
Number	Sino-Korean cardinal numbers			Native Korean cardinal numbers	
Number	Hangul	Hanja	Romanization	Hangul	Romanization
1	일	一	il	하나	hana
2	이	二	i	둘	dul
3	삼	三	sam	셋	set
4	사	四	sa	넷	net
5	오	五	o	다섯	daseot
6	육, 륙	六	yuk, ryuk	여섯	yeoseot
7	칠	七	chil	일곱	ilgop
8	팔	八	pal	여덟	yeodeol
9	구	九	gu	아홉	ahop
10	십	十	sip	열	yeol

Sino-Korean vocabulary consists of:

- words directly borrowed from written Chinese, and
- compounds coined in Korea or Japan and read using the Sino-Korean reading of Chinese characters.

Therefore, just like other words, Korean has two sets of numeral systems. English is similar, having native English words and Latinate equivalents such as water-aqua, fire-flame, sea-marine, two-dual, sun-solar, star-stellar. However unlike English and Latin, which belong to the same Indo-European languages family and bear a certain resemblance, Korean and Chinese are genetically unrelated and the two sets of Korean words differ completely from each other. All Sino-Korean morphemes are monosyllabic as in Chinese, whereas native Korean morphemes can be polysyllabic. The Sino-Korean words were deliberately imported alongside corresponding Chinese characters for a written language and everything was supposed to be written in Hanja, so the coexistence of Sino-Korean would be more thorough and systematic than that of Latinate words in English.

The exact proportion of Sino-Korean vocabulary is a matter of debate. Sohn (2001) stated 50–60%. In 2006 the same author gives an even higher estimate of 65%. Jeong Jae-do, one of the compilers of the dictionary Urimal Keun Sajeon, asserts that the proportion is not so high. He points out that Korean dictionaries compiled during the colonial period include many unused Sino-Korean words. In his estimation the proportion of Sino-Korean vocabulary in the Korean language might be as low as 30%.

=== Western loanwords ===
The vast majority of loanwords other than Sino-Korean come from modern times, approximately 90% of which are from English. Many words have also been borrowed from Western languages such as German via Japanese (e.g. 아르바이트 (areubaiteu) 'part-time job', 알레르기 (allereugi) 'allergy', 기브스 (gibseu or gibuseu) 'plaster cast used for broken bones'). Some Western words were borrowed indirectly via Japanese during the Japanese occupation of Korea, taking a Japanese sound pattern, for example "dozen" > ダース dāsu > 다스 daseu. However, most indirect Western borrowings are now written according to current "Hangulization" rules for the respective Western language, as if borrowed direct. In South Korean official use, a number of other Sino-Korean country names have been replaced with phonetically oriented "Hangeulizations" of the countries' endonyms or English names.

Because of such a prevalence of English in modern South Korean culture and society, lexical borrowing is inevitable. English-derived Korean, or "Konglish" (콩글리시), is increasingly used. The vocabulary of the South Korean dialect of the Korean language is roughly 5% loanwords (excluding Sino-Korean vocabulary). However, owing to North Korea's isolation, such influence is lacking in North Korean speech.

== Gender ==
In general, Korean lacks grammatical gender. As one of the few exceptions, the third-person singular pronoun has two different forms: 그 geu (masculine) and 그녀 geunyeo (feminine). Before 그녀 was invented in need of translating 'she' into Korean, 그 was the only third-person singular pronoun and had no grammatical gender. Its origin causes 그녀 never to be used in spoken Korean but appearing only in writing.

To have a more complete understanding of the intricacies of gender in Korean, three models of language and gender have been proposed: the deficit model, the dominance model, and the cultural difference model. In the deficit model, male speech is seen as the default, and any form of speech that diverges from that norm (female speech) is seen as lesser than. The dominance model sees women as lacking in power due to living within a patriarchal society. The cultural difference model proposes that the difference in upbringing between men and women can explain the differences in their speech patterns. Korean's lack of grammatical gender makes it different from most European languages. Rather, gendered differences in Korean can be observed through formality, intonation, word choice, etc.

However, one can still find stronger contrasts between genders within Korean speech. Some examples of this can be seen in: (1) the softer tone used by women in speech; (2) a married woman introducing herself as someone's mother or wife, not with her own name; (3) the presence of gender differences in titles and occupational terms (for example, a sajang is a company president, and yeosajang is a female company president); (4) females sometimes using more tag questions and rising tones in statements, also seen in speech from children.

Between two people of asymmetric status in Korean society, people tend to emphasize differences in status for the sake of solidarity. Koreans prefer to use kinship terms, rather than any other terms of reference. In traditional Korean society, women have long been in disadvantaged positions. Korean social structure traditionally was a patriarchically dominated family system that emphasized the maintenance of family lines. That structure has tended to separate the roles of women from those of men.

Cho and Whitman (2019) explore how categories such as male and female and social context influence Korean's features. For example, they point out that usage of jagi (자기 'you') is dependent on context. While jagi is usually used as a reflexive pronoun, especially as 'oneself', its meaning has become diverse in modern times. For example, among middle-aged women, jagi is used to address someone who is close to them, while young Koreans use jagi to address their lovers or spouses regardless of gender.

Korean society's prevalent attitude towards men being in public (outside the home) and women living in private still exists today. For instance, the word for husband is bakkannyangban (바깥양반 'outside nobleman'), but a husband introduces his wife as ansaram (안사람 an 'inside' 'person'). Also in kinship terminology, oe (외/外 'outside') is added for maternal grandparents, creating oeharabeoji and oehalmeoni (외할아버지, 외할머니 'grandfather and grandmother'), with different lexicons for males and females and patriarchal society revealed. Further, in interrogatives to an addressee of equal or lower status, Korean men tend to use haennya (했냐? 'did it?') in aggressive masculinity, but women use haenni (했니? 'did it?') as a soft expression. However, there are exceptions. Korean society used the question endings -ni (니) and -nya (냐), the former prevailing among women and men until a few decades ago. In fact, -nya (냐) was characteristic of the Jeolla and Chungcheong dialects. However, since the 1950s, large numbers of people have moved to Seoul from Chungcheong and Jeolla, and they began to influence the way men speak. Recently, women also have used the -nya (냐). As for -ni (니), it is usually used toward people to be polite even to someone not close or younger. As for -nya (냐), it is used mainly to close friends regardless of gender.

Like the case of "actor" and "actress", it also is possible to add a gender prefix for emphasis: biseo (비서 'secretary') is sometimes combined with yeo (여 'female') to form yeobiseo (여비서 'female secretary'); namja (남자 'man') often is added to ganhosa (간호사 'nurse') to form namja ganhosa (남자 간호사 'male nurse').

Another crucial difference between men and women is the tone and pitch of their voices and how they affect the perception of politeness. Men learn to use an authoritative falling tone; in Korean culture, a deeper voice is associated with being more polite. In addition to the deferential speech endings being used, men are seen as more polite as well as impartial, and professional. While women who use a rising tone in postposition with -yo (요) are not perceived to be as polite as men. The -yo (요) also indicates uncertainty since the ending has many prefixes that indicate uncertainty and questioning while the deferential ending has no prefixes to indicate uncertainty. The -hamnida (합니다) ending is the most polite and formal form of Korea, and the -yo (요) ending is less polite and formal, which reinforces the perception of women as less professional.

Hedges and euphemisms to soften assertions are common in women's speech. Women traditionally add nasal sounds neyng, neym, ney-e in the last syllable more frequently than men. Often, l is added in women's for female stereotypes and so igeolo (이거로 'this thing') becomes igeollo (이걸로 'this thing') to communicate a lack of confidence and passivity.

Women use more linguistic markers such as exclamation eomeo (어머 'oh') and eojjeom (어쩜 'what a surprise') than men do in cooperative communication.

== Writing system ==
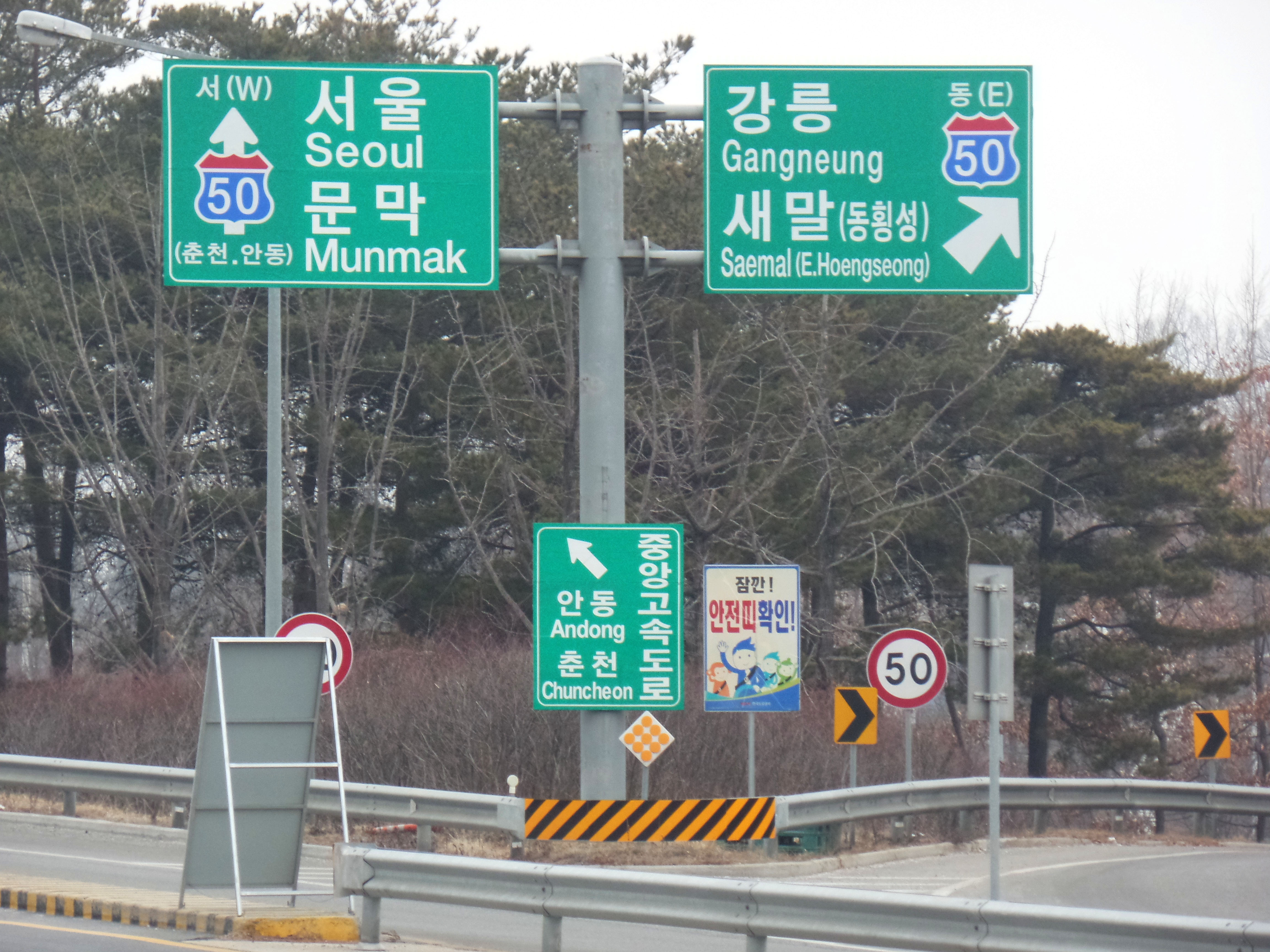
The Latin alphabet used in romanization on road signs, for foreigners in South Korea

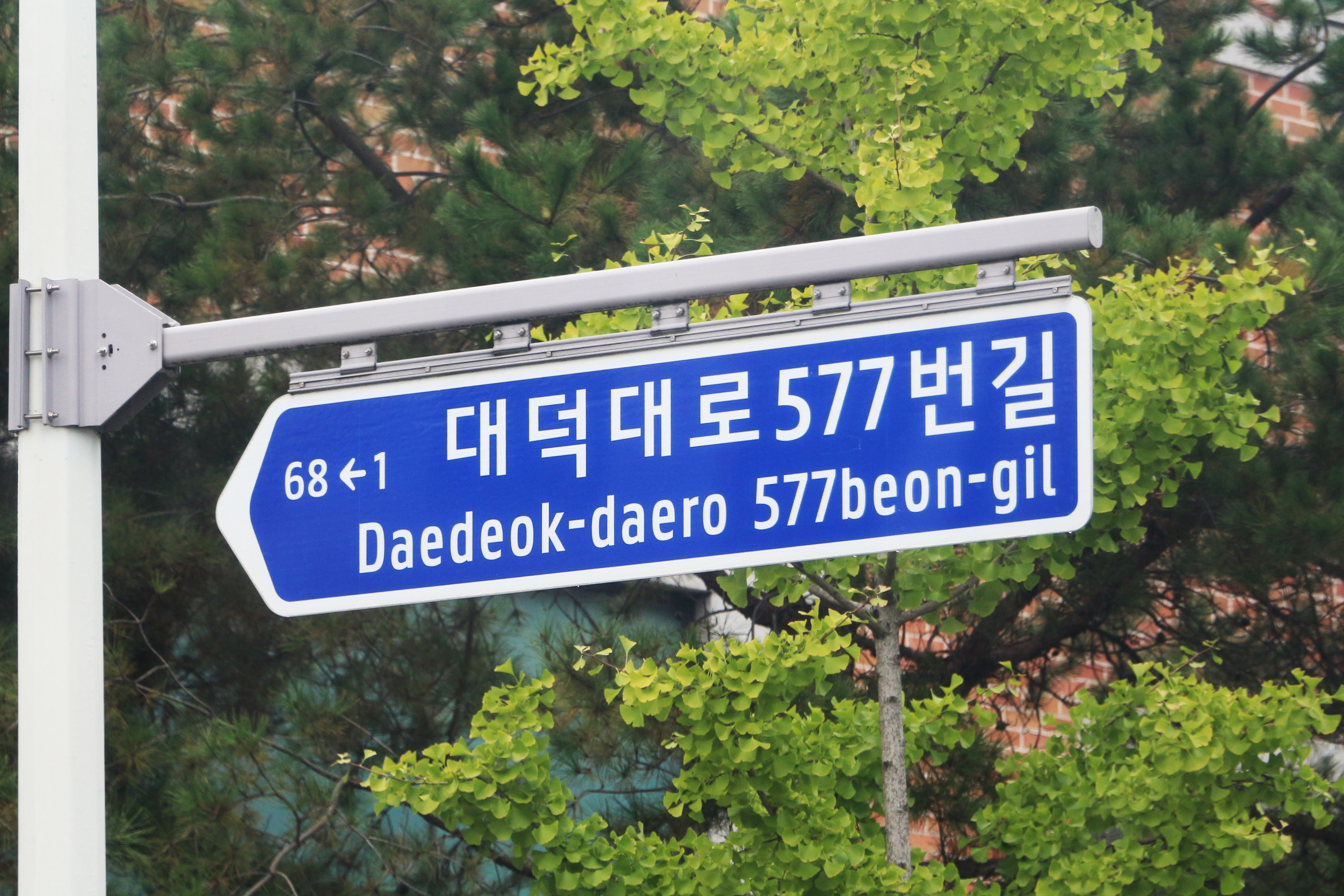
Road Name Address sign in Hangul and Latin script in South Korea

Modern Korean is written with an alphabet script, known as Hangul in South Korea and Chosŏn'gŭl in North Korea. The Korean mixed script, combining Hanja and Hangul, is still used to a certain extent in South Korea, but that method is slowly declining in use even though students learn Hanja in school.

Below are charts of the letters of the Korean alphabet and their Revised Romanization (RR) and canonical International Phonetic Alphabet (IPA) values:

Consonants
Hangul	ㄱ	ㄲ	ㄴ	ㄷ	ㄸ	ㄹ	ㅁ	ㅂ	ㅃ	ㅅ	ㅆ	ㅇ	ㅈ	ㅉ	ㅊ	ㅋ	ㅌ	ㅍ	ㅎ
RR	g	kk	n	d	tt	r (initial), l (final)	m	b	pp	s	ss	— (initial), ng (final)	j	jj	ch	k	t	p	h
IPA	k	k͈	n	t	t͈	ɾ (initial), ɭ (final)	m	p	p͈	s	s͈	∅ (initial), ŋ (final)	t͡ɕ	t͡ɕ͈	t͡ɕʰ	kʰ	tʰ	pʰ	h

Vowels
Hangul	ㅣ	ㅔ	ㅚ	ㅐ	ㅏ	ㅗ	ㅜ	ㅓ	ㅡ	ㅢ	ㅖ	ㅒ	ㅑ	ㅛ	ㅠ	ㅕ	ㅟ	ㅞ	ㅙ	ㅘ	ㅝ
RR	i	e	oe	ae	a	o	u	eo	eu	ui	ye	yae	ya	yo	yu	yeo	wi	we	wae	wa	wo
IPA	i	e	ø, we	ɛ	a	o	u	ʌ	ɯ	ɰi	je	jɛ	ja	jo	ju	jʌ	ɥi, wi	we	wɛ	wa	wʌ

The letters of the Korean alphabet are not written linearly like most alphabets, but instead arranged into blocks that represent syllables. So, while the word bibimbap (Korean rice dish) is written as eight characters in a row in the Latin alphabet, in Korean it is written 비빔밥, as three "syllabic blocks" in a row. Mukbang (먹방 'eating show') is seven characters after romanization but only two "syllabic blocks" before.

Modern Korean is written with spaces between words, a feature not found in Chinese or Japanese (except when Japanese is written exclusively in hiragana, as in children's books). The marks used for Korean punctuation are almost identical to Western ones. Traditionally, Korean was written in columns, from top to bottom, right to left, like traditional Chinese. However, the syllabic blocks are now usually written in rows, from left to right, top to bottom, like English.

== Dialects ==
Korean dialect zones

Korean has numerous small local dialects (called mal (말; lit. ''speech''), saturi (사투리), or bangeon (방언; 方言)). South Korean authors claim that the standard language (pyojuneo or pyojunmal) of both South Korea and North Korea is based on the dialect of the area around Seoul (which, as Hanyang, was the capital of Joseon-era Korea for 500 years), but since 1966, North Korea officially states that its standard is based on the Pyongyang speech. All dialects of Korean are similar to one another and largely are mutually intelligible (with the exception of dialect-specific phrases or nonstandard vocabulary unique to dialects) though the dialect of Jeju Island is divergent enough to be generally considered a separate language. The Yukjin dialect in the far northeast is also quite distinctive.

One of the more salient differences between dialects is the use of tone: speakers of the Seoul dialect make use of vowel length, but speakers of the Gyeongsang dialect maintain the pitch accent of Middle Korean. Some dialects are conservative, maintaining Middle Korean sounds (such as z, β, ə), which have been lost from the standard language, and others are highly innovative.

Kang Yoonjung & Han Sungwoo (2013), Kim Mi-Ryoung (2013), and Cho Sunghye (2017) suggest that the modern Seoul dialect is currently undergoing tonogenesis based on the finding that in recent years lenis consonants (ㅂㅈㄷㄱ), aspirated consonants (ㅍㅊㅌㅋ) and fortis consonants (ㅃㅉㄸㄲ) were shifting from a distinction via voice onset time to that of pitch change; however, Choi Jiyoun, Kim Sahyang & Cho Taehong (2020) disagree with the suggestion that the consonant distinction shifting away from voice onset time is due to the introduction of tonal features, and instead proposes that it is a prosodically conditioned change.

There is substantial evidence for a history of extensive dialect levelling or even convergent evolution or intermixture of two or more originally-distinct linguistic stocks, within the Korean language and its dialects. Many Korean dialects have a basic vocabulary that is etymologically distinct from vocabulary of identical meaning in Standard Korean or other dialects. For example, "garlic chives" translated into Gyeongsang dialect is [t͡ɕʌŋ.ɡu.d͡ʑi] (정구지; jeongguji), but in Standard Korean, it is [puːt͡ɕʰu] (부추; buchu). This suggests that the Korean Peninsula may have at one time been much more linguistically diverse than it is today. See also the Japanese–Koreanic languages hypothesis.

== North–South differences ==
The language used in the North and the South exhibit differences in pronunciation, spelling, grammar and vocabulary.

=== Pronunciation ===
In North Korea, palatalization of /si/ is optional, and /t͡ɕ/ can be pronounced [z] between vowels.

Words that are written the same way may be pronounced differently (such as the examples below). The pronunciations below are given in Revised Romanization, McCune–Reischauer and modified Hangul (what the Korean characters would be if one were to write the word as pronounced).

Word	RR	Meaning	Pronunciation					
Word	RR	Meaning	North			South		
Word	RR	Meaning	RR	MR	Chosŏn'gŭl	RR	MR	Hangul
읽고	ilgo	to read (continuative form)	ilko	ilko	(일)코	ilkko	ilkko	(일)꼬
압록강	amnokgang	Amnok River	amrokgang	amrokkang	암(록)깡	amnokkang	amnokkang	암녹깡
독립	dongnip	independence	dongrip	tongrip	동(립)	dongnip	tongnip	동닙
관념	gwannyeom	idea / sense / conception	gwallyeom	kwallyŏm	괄렴	gwannyeom	kwannyŏm	(관)념
혁신적*	hyeoksinjeok	innovative	hyeoksinjjeok	hyŏksintchŏk	(혁)씬쩍	hyeoksinjeok	hyŏksinjŏk	(혁)씬(적)

* In the North, similar pronunciation is used whenever the Hanja "的" is attached to a Sino-Korean word ending in ㄴ, ㅁ or ㅇ.

* In the South, this rule only applies when it is attached to any single-character Sino-Korean word.

=== Spelling ===
Some words are spelled differently by the North and the South, but the pronunciations are the same.

Word		Meaning	Pronunciation (RR/MR)	Remarks
North spelling	South spelling	Meaning	Pronunciation (RR/MR)	Remarks
해빛	햇빛	sunshine	haeppit (haepit)	The "sai siot" ('ㅅ' used for indicating sound change) is almost never written out in the North.
벗꽃	벚꽃	cherry blossom	beotkkot (pŏtkkot)	
못읽다	못 읽다	cannot read	modikda (modikta)	Spacing.
한나산	한라산	Hallasan	hallasan (hallasan)	When a ㄴㄴ combination is pronounced as ll, the original Hangul spelling is kept in the North, whereas the Hangul is changed in the South.
규률	규율	rules	gyuyul (kyuyul)	In words where the original Hanja is spelt "렬" or "률" and follows a vowel, the initial ㄹ is not pronounced in the North, making the pronunciation identical with that in the South where the ㄹ is dropped in the spelling.

=== Spelling and pronunciation ===
Basically, the standard languages of North and South Korea, including pronunciation and vocabulary, are both linguistically based on the Seoul dialect, but in North Korea, words have been modified to reflect the theories of scholars like Kim Tu-bong, who sought a refined language, as well as political needs. Some differences are difficult to explain in terms of political ideas, such as North Korea's use of the word rajio (라지오).:

Word				Meaning	Remarks
North spelling	North pronun.	South spelling	South pronun.	Meaning	Remarks
력량	ryeongryang (ryŏngryang)	역량	yeongnyang (yŏngnyang)	strength	Initial r's are dropped if followed by i or y in the South Korean version of Korean.
로동	rodong (rodong)	노동	nodong (nodong)	work	Initial r's are demoted to an n if not followed by i or y in the South Korean version of Korean.
원쑤	wonssu (wŏnssu)	원수	wonsu (wŏnsu)	mortal enemy	"Mortal enemy" and "field marshal" are homophones in the South. Possibly to avoid referring to Kim Il Sung, Kim Jong Il or Kim Jong Un as the enemy, the second syllable of "enemy" is written and pronounced 쑤 in the North.
라지오	rajio (rajio)	라디오	radio (radio)	radio	In South Korea, the expression rajio is considered a Japanese expression that was introduced during the Japanese colonial rule and does not properly represent the pronunciation of Korean.
우	u (u)	위	wi (wi)	on; above	
안해	anhae (anhae)	아내	anae (anae)	wife	
꾸바	kkuba (kkuba)	쿠바	kuba (k'uba)	Cuba	When transcribing foreign words from languages that do not have contrasts between aspirated and unaspirated stops, North Koreans generally use tensed stops for the unaspirated ones while South Koreans use aspirated stops in both cases.
페	pe (p'e)	폐	pye (p'ye), pe (p'e)	lungs	In the case where ye comes after a consonant, such as in hye and pye, it is pronounced without the palatal approximate. North Korean orthography reflects this pronunciation nuance.

In general, when transcribing place names, North Korea tends to use the pronunciation in the original language more than South Korea, which often uses the pronunciation in English. For example:

Original name	North Korea transliteration		English name	South Korea transliteration	
Original name	Spelling	Pronunciation	English name	Spelling	Pronunciation
Ulaanbaatar	울란바따르	ullanbattareu (ullanbattarŭ)	Ulan Bator	울란바토르	ullanbatoreu (ullanbat'orŭ)
København	쾨뻰하븐	koeppenhabeun (k'oeppenhabŭn)	Copenhagen	코펜하겐	kopenhagen (k'op'enhagen)
al-Qāhirah	까히라	kkahira (kkahira)	Cairo	카이로	kairo (k'airo)

=== Grammar ===
Some grammatical constructions are also different:

Word				Meaning	Remarks
North spelling	North pronun.	South spelling	South pronun.	Meaning	Remarks
되였다	doeyeotda (toeyŏtta)	되었다	doeeotda (toeŏtta)	past tense of 되다 (doeda/toeda), "to become"	All similar grammar forms of verbs or adjectives that end in ㅣ in the stem (i.e. ㅣ, ㅐ, ㅔ, ㅚ, ㅟ and ㅢ) in the North use 여 instead of the South's 어.
고마와요	gomawayo (komawayo)	고마워요	gomawoyo (komawŏyo)	thanks	ㅂ-irregular verbs in the North use 와 (wa) for all those with a positive ending vowel; this only happens in the South if the verb stem has only one syllable.
할가요	halgayo (halkayo)	할까요	halkkayo (halkkayo)	Shall we do?	Although the Hangul differ, the pronunciations are the same (i.e. with the tensed ㄲ sound).

=== Punctuation ===
In the North, guillemets (《 and 》) are the symbols used for quotes; in the South, quotation marks equivalent to the English ones (" and ") are standard (although 『 』 and 「 」 are also used).

=== Vocabulary ===
Some vocabulary is different between the North and the South:

Word				Meaning	Remarks
North word	North pronun.	South word	South pronun.	Meaning	Remarks
문화주택	munhwajutaek (munhwajut'aek)	아파트	apateu (ap'at'ŭ)	Apartment	아빠트 (appateu/appat'ŭ) is also used in the North.
조선어	joseoneo (chosŏnŏ)	한국어	hangugeo (han'gugŏ)	Korean language	The Japanese pronunciation of 조선말 was used throughout Korea and Manchuria during Japanese imperial rule, but after liberation, the government in the South chose the name 대한민국 (daehanminguk) which was derived from the name immediately prior to Japanese imperial rule, and claimed by government-in-exile from 1919. The syllable 한 (han) was drawn from the same source as that name (in reference to the Han people). Read more. 조선어 (joseoneo/chosŏnŏ) is officially used in the North.
곽밥	gwakbap (kwakpap)	도시락	dosirak (tosirak)	lunch box	
동무	dongmu (tongmu)	친구	chingu (ch'in'gu)	Friend	동무 was originally a non-ideological word for "friend" used all over the Korean peninsula, but North Koreans later adopted it as the equivalent of the Communist term of address "comrade". As a result, to South Koreans today the word has a heavy political tinge, and so they have shifted to using other words for friend like chingu (친구) or beot (벗). Today, beot (벗) is closer to a term used in literature, and chingu (친구) is the widest-used word for friend. Such changes were made after the Korean War and the ideological battle between the anti-Communist government in the South and North Korea's communism.

== Geographic distribution ==
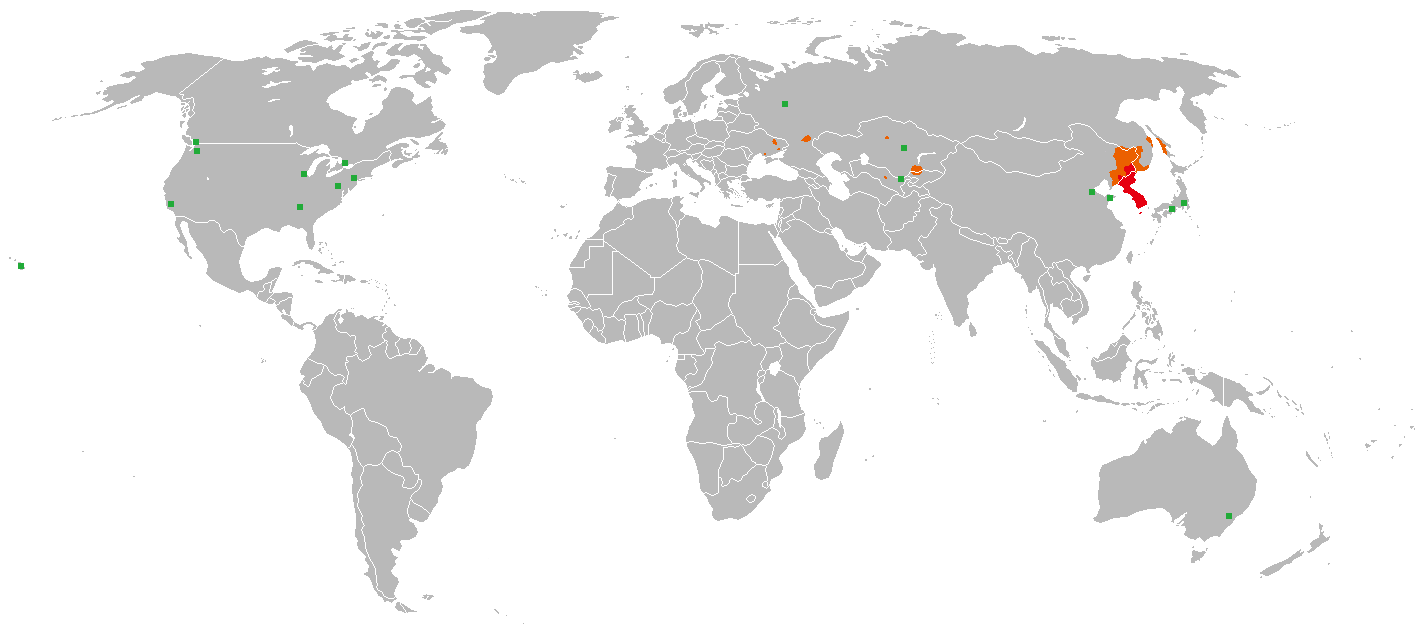
Global map of Korean language distribution Spoken by a majority of the population Spoken by a significant minority of the population Local minority Korean-speaking populations

Korean is spoken by the Korean people in both South Korea and North Korea, and by the Korean diaspora in many countries including the People's Republic of China, the United States, Japan, and Russia. In 2001, Korean was the fourth most popular foreign language in China, following English, Japanese, and Russian. Korean-speaking minorities exist in these states, but because of cultural assimilation into host countries, not all ethnic Koreans may speak it with native fluency.

=== Official status ===
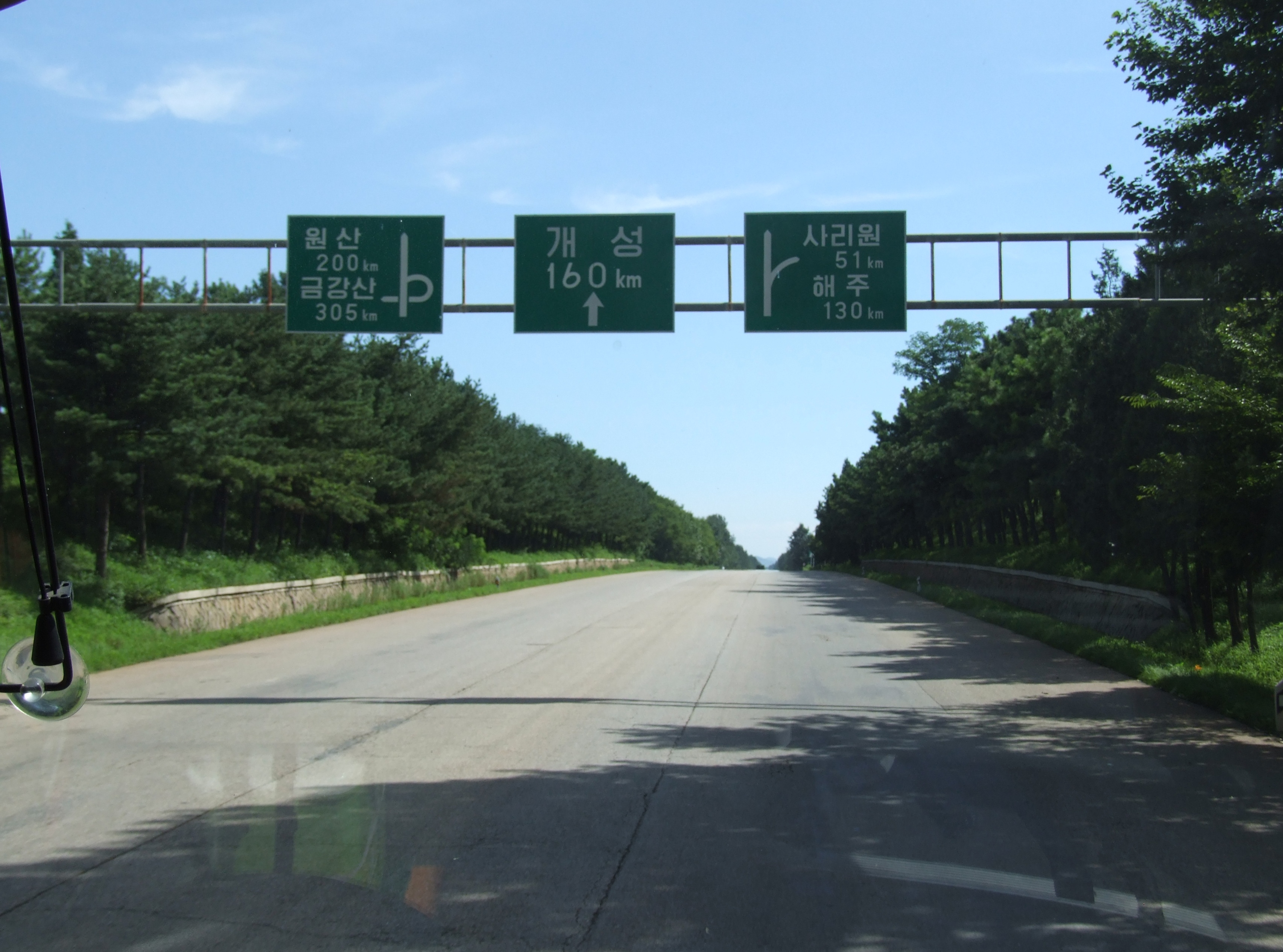
Highway sign in Korean,
Pyongyang–Kaesong Motorway, Pyongyang, Korea

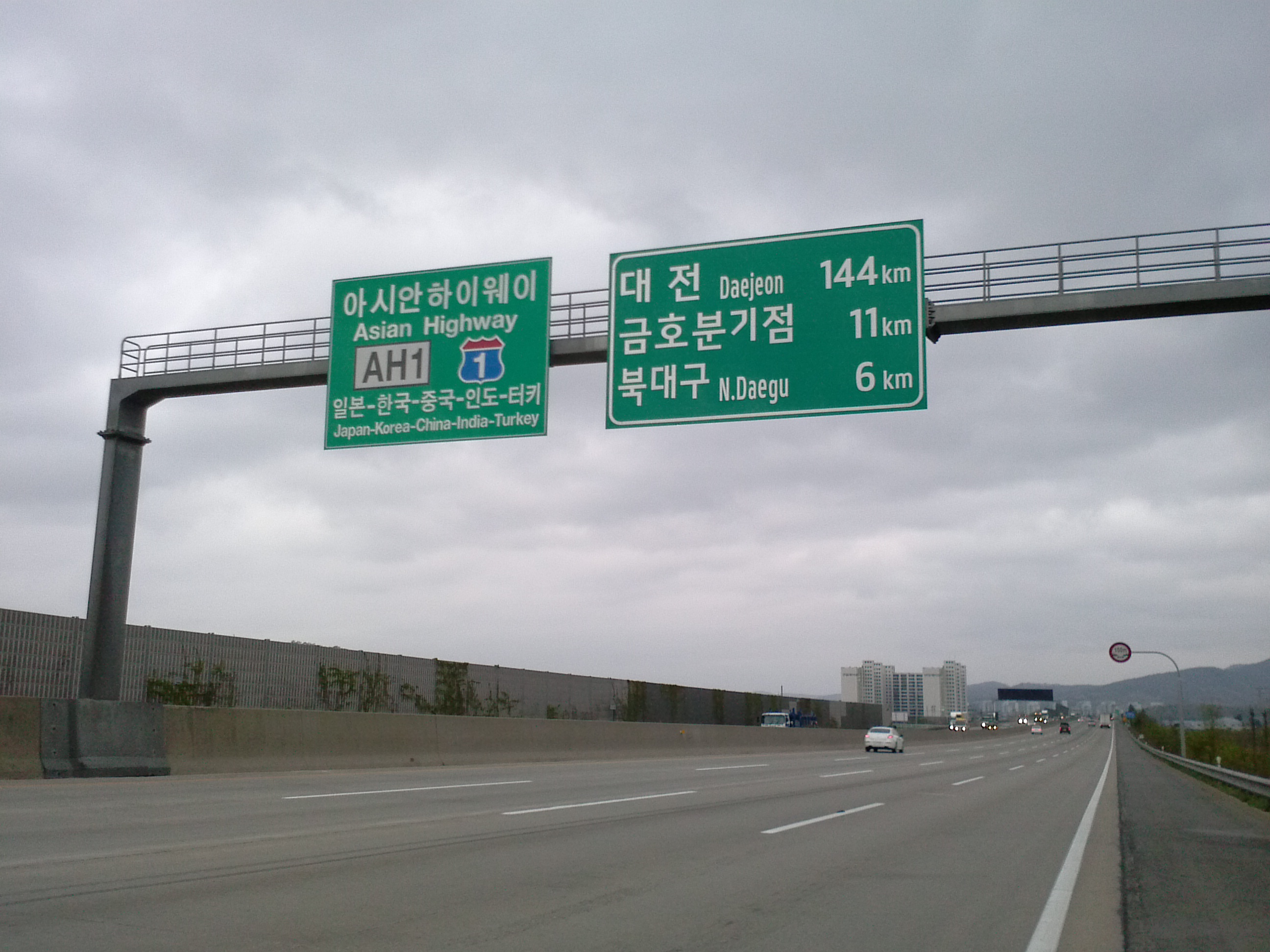
Highway sign in Korean and English,
Gyeongbu Expressway, Daegu, Korea

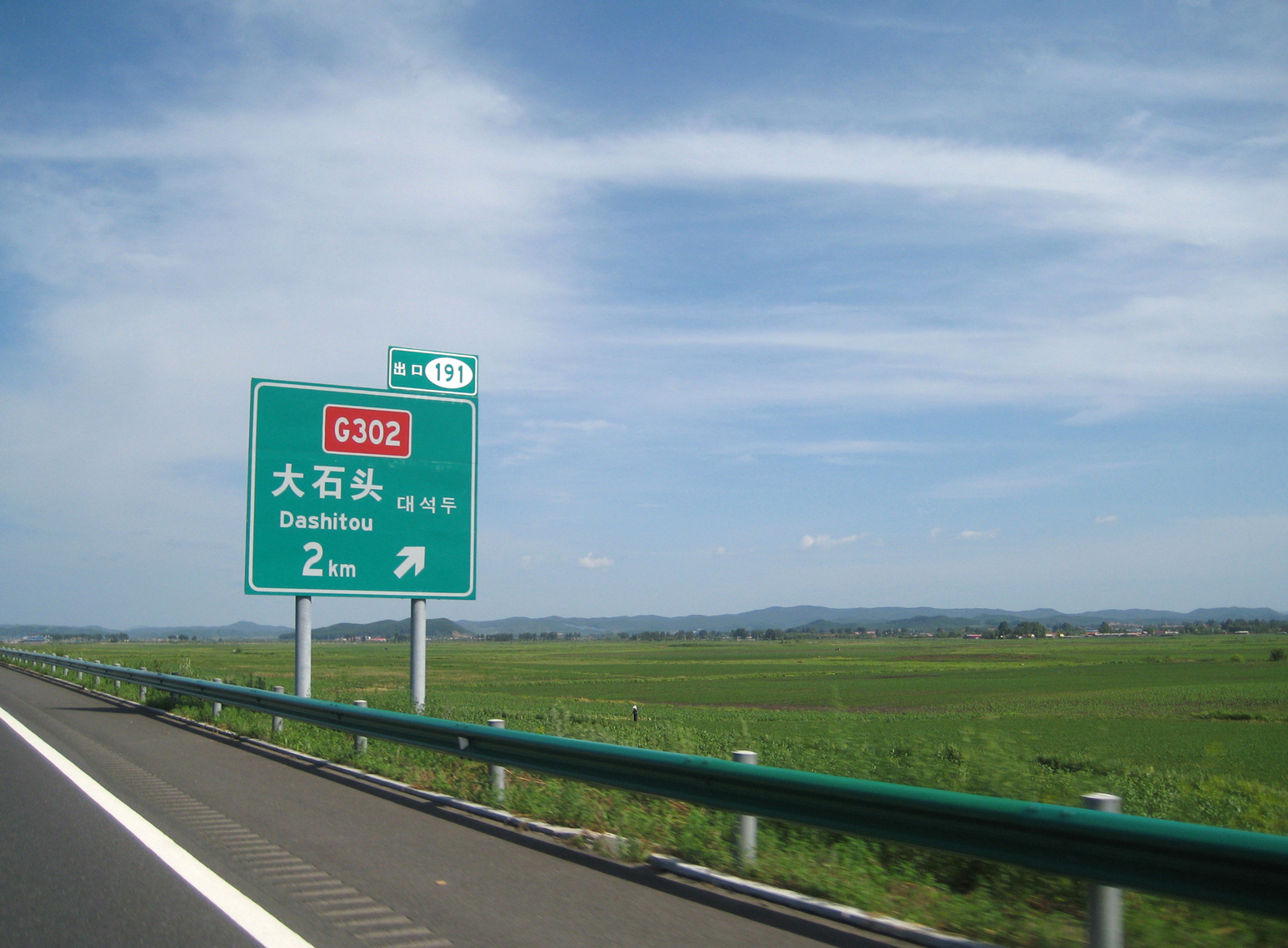
Highway sign in Korean and Chinese,
Hunwu Expressway, Yanbian, China

Korean is the official language of South Korea and North Korea. It, along with Mandarin Chinese, is also one of the two official languages of China's Yanbian Korean Autonomous Prefecture.

In North Korea, the regulatory body is the Language Institute of the Academy of Social Sciences (사회과학원 어학연구소; 社會科學院語學硏究所). In South Korea, the regulatory body for Korean is the Seoul-based National Institute of Korean Language, which was created by presidential decree on 23 January 1991.

=== King Sejong Institute ===
Established pursuant to Article 9, Section 2, of the Framework Act on the National Language, the King Sejong Institute is a public institution set up to coordinate the government's project of propagating Korean language and culture; it also supports the King Sejong Institute, which is the institution's overseas branch. The King Sejong Institute was established in response to:

- An increase in the demand for Korean language education;
- a rapid increase in Korean language education thanks to the spread of the culture (hallyu), an increase in international marriage, the expansion of Korean enterprises into overseas markets, and enforcement of employment licensing system;
- the need for a government-sanctioned Korean language educational institution;
- the need for general support for overseas Korean language education based on a successful domestic language education program.

King Sejong Institute has 59 in Europe, 15 in Africa, 146 in Asia, 34 in the Americas, and 4 in Oceania.

=== TOPIK Korea Institute ===
The TOPIK Korea Institute is a lifelong educational center affiliated with a variety of Korean universities in Seoul, South Korea, whose aim is to promote Korean language and culture, support local Korean teaching internationally, and facilitate cultural exchanges.

The institute is sometimes compared to language and culture promotion organizations such as the King Sejong Institute. Unlike that organization, however, the TOPIK Korea Institute operates within established universities and colleges around the world, providing educational materials. In countries around the world, Korean embassies and cultural centers (한국문화원) administer TOPIK examinations.

== Foreign language ==
For native English-speakers, Korean is generally considered to be one of the most difficult foreign languages to master despite the relative ease of learning Hangul. For instance, the United States' Defense Language Institute places Korean in Category IV with Japanese, Chinese (Mandarin and Cantonese), and Arabic, requiring 64 weeks of instruction (as compared to just 26 weeks for Category I languages like Italian, French, and Spanish) to bring an English-speaking student to a limited working level of proficiency in which they have "sufficient capability to meet routine social demands and limited job requirements" and "can deal with concrete topics in past, present, and future tense." Similarly, the Foreign Service Institute's School of Language Studies places Korean in Category IV, the highest level of difficulty.

The study of the Korean language in the United States was previously dominated by Korean American heritage language students; in 2007, these students were estimated to form over 80% of all students of the language at non-military universities. However, Sejong Institutes in the United States have noted a sharp rise in the number of people of other ethnic backgrounds studying Korean between 2009 and 2011, which they attribute to rising popularity of South Korean music and television shows. In 2018, it was reported that the rise in K-Pop was responsible for the increase in people learning the language in US universities.

=== Testing ===
There are two widely used tests of Korean as a foreign language: the Korean Language Ability Test (KLAT) and the Test of Proficiency in Korean (TOPIK). The Korean Language Proficiency Test, an examination aimed at assessing non-native speakers' competence in Korean, was instituted in 1997; 17,000 people applied for the 2005 sitting of the examination. The TOPIK was first administered in 1997 and was taken by 2,274 people. Since then the total number of people who have taken the TOPIK has surpassed 1 million, with more than 150,000 candidates taking the test in 2012. TOPIK is administered in 45 regions within South Korea and 72 nations outside of South Korea, with a significant portion being administered in Japan and North America, which would suggest the targeted audience for TOPIK is still primarily foreigners of Korean heritage. This is also evident in TOPIK's website, where the examination is introduced as intended for Korean heritage students.

== Example text ==
From Article 1 of the Universal Declaration of Human Rights in Korean (South Korean standard):

모든 인간은 태어날 때부터 자유로우며 그 존엄과 권리에 있어 동등하다. 인간은 천부적으로 이성과 양심을 부여받았으며 서로 형제애의 정신으로 행동하여야 한다.
Modeun inganeun taeeonal ttaebuteo jayuroumyeo geu joneomgwa gwollie isseo dongdeunghada. Inganeun cheonbujeogeuro iseonggwa yangsimeul buyeobadasseumyeo seoro hyeongjeaeui jeongsineuro haengdonghayeoya handa.
All human beings are born free and equal in dignity and rights. They are endowed with reason and conscience and should act towards one another in a spirit of brotherhood.

== Korean Languages Keyboard ==
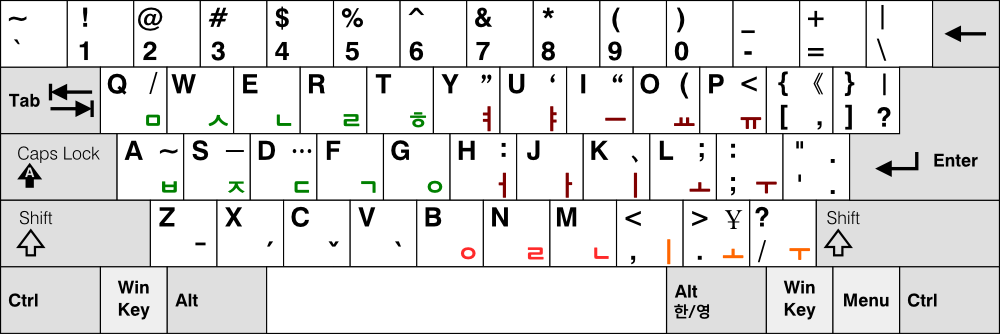
Korean Languages in Computer

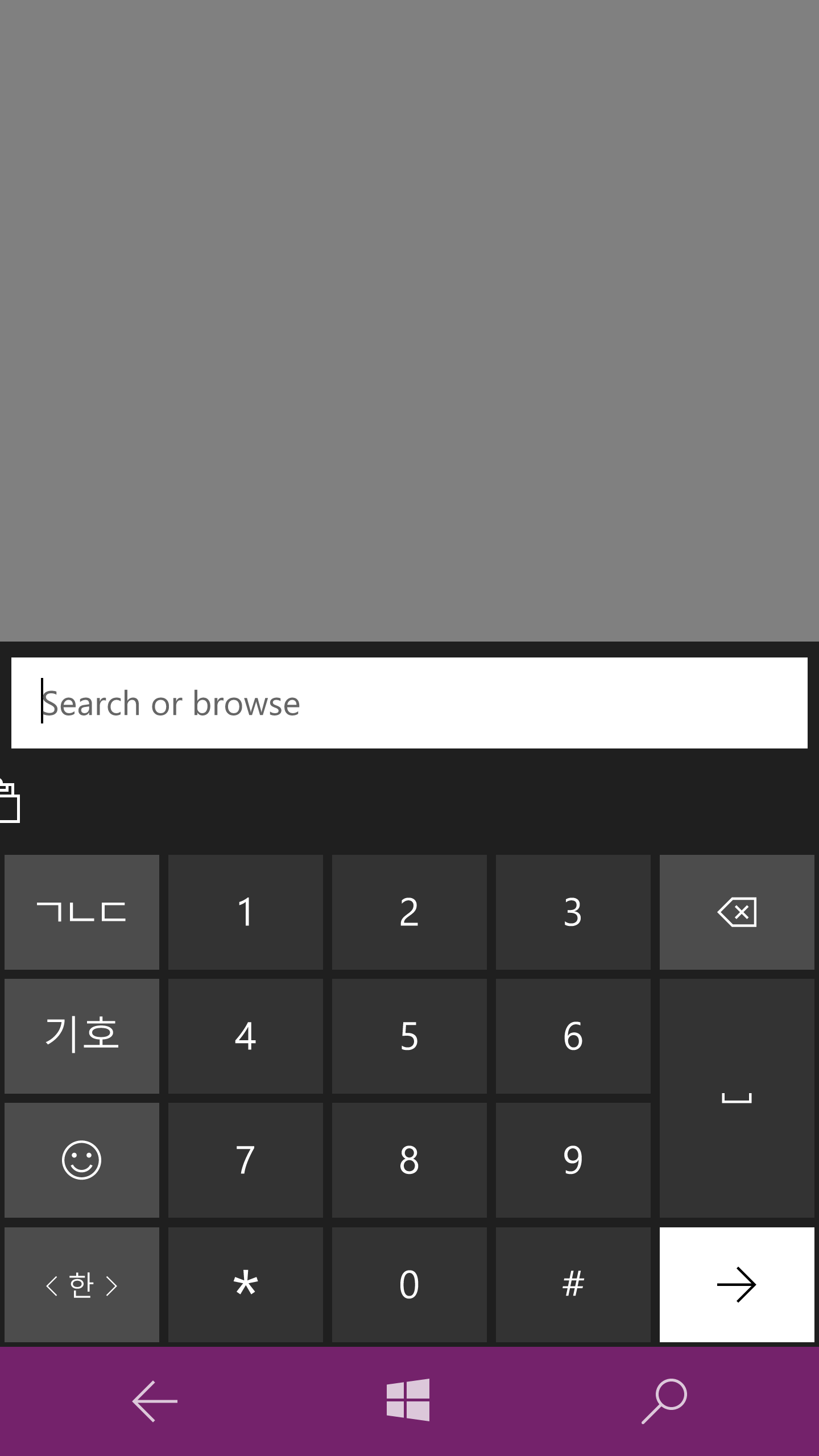
Korean Languages in Phones

== See also ==
- Korean Wave
- Miracle on the Han River
- Outline of Korean language
- Korean count word
- Korean Cultural Center (KCC)
- Korean dialects
- Korean language and computers
- Korean as a foreign language
- Korean mixed script
- Debate on mixed script and Hangul exclusivity
- Korean particles
- Korean proverbs
- Korean words
- Korean sign language
- Korean romanization
  - McCune–Reischauer
  - Revised romanization of Korean
  - Yale romanization of Korean
- List of English words of Korean origin
- Vowel harmony
- History of Korean

== Cited works ==
- Brown, L. (2015). "Expressive, Social and Gendered Meanings of Korean Honorifics". Korean Linguistics. 17 (2): 242–266. doi:10.1075/kl.17.2.04bro.
- Cho, Young A. (2006). "Gender Differences in Korean Speech". In Sohn, Ho-min (ed.). Korean Language in Culture and Society. University of Hawaii Press. p. 189.
- Cho, Sungdai; Whitman, John (2020). Korean: A Linguistic Introduction. Cambridge University Press. ISBN 978-0-521-51485-9.
- Lee, Iksop; Ramsey, S. Robert (2000). The Korean Language. SUNY Press. ISBN 978-0-7914-4831-1.
- Lee, Ki-Moon; Ramsey, S. Robert (2011). A History of the Korean Language. Cambridge University Press. ISBN 978-0-521-66189-8.
- Martin, Samuel E. (1966). "Lexical Evidence Relating Japanese to Korean". Language. 42 (2): 185–251. doi:10.2307/411687. JSTOR 411687.
- Martin, Samuel E. (1990). "Morphological clues to the relationship of Japanese and Korean". In Baldi, Philip (ed.). Linguistic Change and Reconstruction Methodology. Trends in Linguistics: Studies and Monographs. Vol. 45. pp. 483–509.
- Miller, Roy Andrew (1971). Japanese and the Other Altaic Languages. Chicago, IL: University of Chicago Press. ISBN 0-226-52719-0.
- Miller, Roy Andrew (1996). Languages and History: Japanese, Korean and Altaic. Oslo, Norway: Institute for Comparative Research in Human Culture. ISBN 974-8299-69-4.
- Sohn, Ho-Min (2001) [1999]. The Korean Language. Cambridge, England: Cambridge University Press. ISBN 978-0-521-36943-5.
- Sohn, Ho-Min (2006). Korean Language in Culture and Society. Boston, MA: Twayne Publishers. ISBN 978-0-8248-2694-9.
- Vovin, Alexander (2010). Koreo-Japonica: A Re-evaluation of a Common Genetic Origin. Honolulu, HI: University of Hawaiʻi Press.
- Vovin, Alexander (2008). Man'yōshū to Fudoki ni Mirareru Fushigina Kotoba to Jōdai Nihon Retto ni Okeru Ainugo no Bunpu 萬葉集と風土記に見られる不思議な言葉と上代日本列島に於けるアイヌ語の分布 [Strange Words in the Man'yoshū and the Fudoki and the Distribution of the Ainu Language in the Japanese Islands in Prehistory] (PDF) (Report) (in Japanese). International Research Center for Japanese Studies. Archived from the original (PDF) on 11 February 2014.
- Whitman, John B. (1985). The Phonological Basis for the Comparison of Japanese and Korean (PhD thesis). Cambridge, MA: Harvard University.
