= List of Korean placename etymologies =

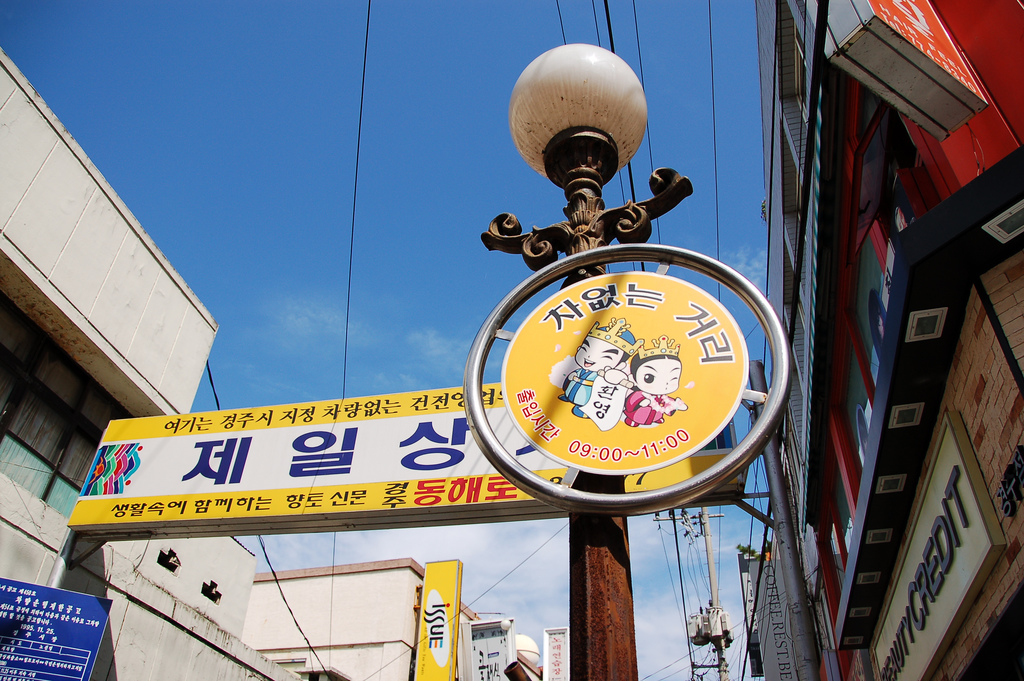
A Korean sign for Gyeongju, which translates to "congratulatory province" or "capital province".

Korean place name etymologies are based upon a large linguistic background of Chinese, Japanese and Old Korean influence and history. The commonplace names have multiple meanings in Korean, Chinese, and when transliterated to English as well. The etymological meanings of these words stem from history, mythology and the landscape of the area. The place names appear with commonality within the Korean Peninsula and therefore attain a level of interest as to why they appear so frequently. Place names are not the country or province but the local area, and usually contain reference to the land it is named for; whether by historical fact or the landscape it is set in. Name elements such as cheon, san, seong, and ju appear often as markers of location or history. Over time, these markers can lose their original meaning, yet they remain as indicators of a historical etymology. Korean place names can contain characters that are Chinese and thus can be transliterated into Chinese with reference to Chinese words. Korean can also follow the similar grammatical structure as Japanese, however whether there is a relationship between the two languages is still unknown as of yet.

== History ==
Korean history is connected to the Korean language, as from early Korean myths and legends they receive many of their common place names. The old Korean language is divided by three distinct types of the language - the Koguryó, Paekche, and Silla kingdoms. It is from the Silla defeat of the other two kingdoms that Korea came to have to its modern-day geographical boundaries, including from the Koryo Dynasty from which the western name for Korea is derived. The Korean language is considered to be structurally closest to Japanese, yet debate amongst linguists still continues as to how the languages are connected. In writing Korea took much from the Chinese with their characters being called Hanja (한자) (in Chinese it is called Hanzi (漢字)) based on the Chinese characters borrowed and added to the Korean language. Some Chinese words can also influence the etymology of Korean place names. A main feature of Korean is Hangul, which is a syllabic writing system. The "clustering of letters" into syllables had been created as a way of bringing writing to the common people, and to contrast the Chinese characters that were used by the literary elite.

=== Japanese occupation of Korea ===
The Korean language has undergone many changes throughout their history and one major impact to this was the Japanese Occupation of Korea from 1910-1945. The Korean language was banned, with schools and universities forbidding the speaking of Korean, and public places adopting Japanese instead. Over 20,000 historical documents were burnt in order to rid Korea of its historical memory, and become an effective subordinate of Japanese control. Cultural and linguistic symbols were destroyed and replaced by the imperial government in effort to assimilate Korea, by language and religion. By 1939 names of Korean families were allowed to be changed to Japanese surnames, with at least 84% of families changing their name. The occupation also forced a worshipping of Japanese gods, emperors and war heroes that many regard as cultural genocide. The Shinto shrines enforced by the government still exist in Korea, in the Japanese language. The issue when looking at Korean etymology after the Japanese occupation is that many inherited Korean words can be confused for Japanese loan words. Japan and Korea have historical contact that began in prehistory, and this has led to loan words between both Korea and Japan. Phonetic similarities have been used as rules to show an etymological connection, but the kinship is based on loan words rather than the Korean language itself.

== Etymology ==
The etymology of Korean words, especially common place names, can have origins in the Chinese language as Korean has taken many of their characters into their own language. Many of Korean place names have roots in Chinese characters, which is evident in their similarities when translated. The etymology of a word is tied to its historical growth, which allows for changes. Many of common Korean place names contain words such as seong (성) (“city” [as in “fortress”]) which reference that certain townships must have been built inside fortresses, or fortifications, and therefore historically have changed since then. History influences many of the common names seen today, such as the city of Gyeongju (경주), which has ties to the Silla kingdom. It was the capital of the kingdom, where it was known as Seorabeol (“capital”), and also Geumseong (“city of gold”). The city was renamed to Gyeongju in 940 by King Taejo, due to its prosperity and fame. It can be translated as “congratulatory city” or “capital city”. Busan also has a historic background to its etymology, as it is Sino-Korean for “cauldron mountain” (부산). The first written recording of Busan was in 1402 as “Dongnae-Busanpo”, and was recorded as “Busanpo” for the latter half of the 15th century. It is believed to be named for Mt. Hwangryeong (황령산), and reflects the geographical changes of the city during the end of the 15th century.

== Comparison with Chinese and Japanese ==
Korean has been considered to be a language isolate, and a language family on its own, by some linguists (Vovin, Janhunen) and part of a larger Transeurasian Macro-Altaic language family by others (Robbeets). From a comparative analysis point of view Korean has been suggested to be related to Japanese as well as the spectrum of SOV-word order languages in the Northern part of Asia centered around Central Siberia by most pre-21st century linguists.

It follows the theory set by Sir William Jones in his hypothesis that all languages have "sprung from some common source which, perhaps, no longer exists." The Korean language has grammatical and phonological similarities with Japanese and large parts of influence in vocabulary from Chinese. In Brian Lewin’s Japanese and Korean: The Problems and History of a Linguistic Comparison, he argues that due to the proximity of both nations as well as their similarities, comparisons between the two languages have been made “especially since both languages differ from the language of China in the same way, due to the nearly analogous influence of Chinese on both of them.” Research of the language's similarities was slow to progress until fragments of the Old Korean Koguryo were made available. It allowed for research by scholars Ki-Moon Lee and Murayama Shichiro to show the relationship of the Koguryo language to Korean and Japanese. However, it is noted that despite the structural agreement Korean and Japanese have, the actual lexicon and grammar match up is smaller than first thought. Comparisons between Korean and Japanese in modern history is often deemed weak by linguists, as historical contact between the two countries led to loan words, which are often hard to differentiate from inherited words. Another theory about Korean and Japanese having similarities is that due to their geographical closeness, there must be a linguistic area of convergence. It has been a contested topic as most linguists disagree with this theory.

Chinese and Korean have a more recent borrowed connection in their use of writing systems, as Korea began to use Classical Chinese from the fourth century to the ninth century onwards. By the seventh century, a writing system called Idu was introduced as a way of transliterating Classical Chinese into Korean, which had to be adapted to represent Koream grammatical structure and inflectional endings. The Chinese characters that still remain in Korean are of importance as they are seen everyday such as in common place names. Many Non-native Korean nouns come from Classical Chinese, such as san "mountain" and kang "river". For example, the city of Cheongju (청주) in Chinese means Qingzhou (淸州). As ju (주) (州 in Chinese) can mean "province", cheong (청) (translated as “blue” in English) does not imply cleanliness as "清洁" (“clean”) but otherwise a sense of serenity "清静" (“quiet”). The town of Cheongju can be noted for the Chinese influence upon the Korean language in its translation. In terms of Korean lettering however, S. Robert Ramsey and Iskop Lee note that “any resemblance of the Korean letters to any Chinese calligraphic style at all, it is an extremely superficial one.”

== Geographical generics ==
Most Korean place names derive either from the Korean language and its predecessors on the Korean peninsula, or from Chinese. However, Korean place names cannot be directly translated from the literal meanings of the different elements which amount to the name itself.

Historical factors could also shape the meaning of the city name as well. In the past, certain cities like Hwaseong and Anseong might have had seong (성) 城 in their names partly because of the presence of fortifications set around the cities which made them look like city fortresses "城堡" although in recent times, there might have the intended meaning might have changed to become city “城市” only. Other factors such as geographical location can influence how the city has been named, such as Busan.

Commonly found in Korean place names:

Romanized	Hangul	Hanja	Meaning
Name Elements
cheon	천	川	river
san	산	山	mountain
seong	성	城	city (fortress)
ju	주	州	province
City Names
Anseong	안성	安城
Busan	부산	釜山	Cauldron - mountain
Cheongju	청주	淸州	Clean province
Daejeon	대전	大田	Big rice-field
Gangneung	강릉	江陵	River – hill
Gongju	공주	公州	Public province
Gwangju	광주	光州	Bright province
Gyeongju	경주	庆州	Capital / Congratulatory province
Hwaseong	화성	華城	Glorious castle
Suwon	수원	水原	Watersource

== Place names ==
- For the countries themselves, see Names of Korea
- List of etymologies of administrative divisions § Korea
