= International Ideographs Core =

Subset of Unicode characters

International Ideographs Core (IICore) is a subset of up to ten thousand CJK Unified Ideographs characters, which can be implemented on devices with limited memories and capability that make it not feasible to implement the full ISO 10646/Unicode standard.

== History ==
The IICore subset was initially raised in the 21st meeting of the Ideographic Rapporteur Group (IRG) in Guilin during 17th-20 November in 2003, and is subsequently passed in the group's 22nd meeting in Chengdu in May 2004.

== See also ==
- Chinese character encoding
- Han unification
