= Korean count word =

Korean words for counting things

The Korean language uses special measure words or counting words for specific objects and events. These suffixes are called subullyusa (수분류사; 數分類詞) in Korean and classified as dependent nouns. They are similar to the ones employed in the Chinese and the Japanese languages.

In English it is "two sheets of paper", not "two papers". Analogously, in Korean jang (장; 張) is used to count sheets or anything that is a paper-like material, for example:

버스 표 열 장
버스 票 열 張
beoseu pyo yeol jang
bus ticket ten 'sheets'
"ten bus tickets"

In fact, the meanings of counter words are frequently extended in metaphorical or other image-based ways. For instance, in addition to counting simply sheets of paper, jang in Korean can be used to refer to any number of thin, paper-like objects. Leaves (namunnip 나뭇잎) are counted using this count word. In this way, a particular count word may be used generally in a very open-ended manner and up to the construal or creativity of the speaker.

There are two systems of numerals in Korean: native Korean and Sino-Korean. Native Korean numerals are used with most counter words, and usually count the number of an object, while Sino-Korean numerals are generally used for indicating a specific object in series, such as a specific lesson in a book, as well as monetary units and scientific measurements. Sometimes both types of numerals may be used, usually native Korean numerals indicating a quantity and Sino-Korean numerals indicating an ordinal. For example:

열 과
열 課
yeol gwa
'ten lessons'

십 과
十 課
sip gwa
'lesson ten'

There are exceptions, such as native Korean numbers being used with 시, meaning "hour of the day". Additionally some counters (mostly those associated with traditional units) modify the pronunciation and spelling of the numerals that precede it, most notably 6월 is 유월 and 10월 is 시월.

== List of count words ==
Some count words take native Korean numerals:

Hangul	Hanja	RR	MR	Usage
가구	家口	gagu	kaku	families (ie. 10 households live on this cul-de-sac)
개	個	gae	kae	'things' in general, often used as a coverall when the specific count word is unknown (for example, by children)
개국	個國	gaeguk	kaeguk	countries
개소	個所	gaeso	kaeso	places
건	件	geon	kŏn	cases, matters, documents
고랑		gorang	korang	ridges/furrows made for planting crops
과	課	gwa	kwa	lessons (if paired with Sino-Korean numeral, lesson number)
구	具	gu	ku	corpses
군데		gunde	kunde	places
권	卷	gwon	kwŏn	books
그루		geuru	kŭru	trees, shrubs
다발		dabal	tabal	bunches of flowers or plants
단		dan	tan	bunches of Welsh onions, green onions, newspaper columns
대	臺	dae	tae	vehicles (cars, airplanes, etc.) and machinery (incl. computers)
동	棟	dong	tong	buildings
마리		mari	mari	animals
매	枚	mae	mae	sheets of paper, photos, stamps, etc.
명	名	myeong	myŏng	people (informal)
모금		mogeum	mogŭm	mouthfuls (of liquid or gas)
문	門	mun	mun	cannons, big guns
바퀴		bakwi	pak'wi	times circling around an area
발	發	bal	pal	bullets, shells, arrows, etc.
발짝		baljjak	paljjak	steps
방	放	bang	pang	shots fired from a gun or cannon; number of times explosives are set; jabs; photos shot; farts
배	杯	bae	pae	glass of (usually alcoholic) beverages
배	拜	bae	pae	bowing
번	番	beon	pŏn	times a task is done
벌		beol	pŏl	items of clothing
부	部	bu	pu	copies of printed material
분		bun	pun	people (honorific)
뼘		ppyeom	ppyŏm	hand spans
살		sal	sal	years old (generally avoided when using honorifics)
송이		song-i	songi	picked flowers, bunches of fruit (grapes, bananas, etc.)
수	手	su	su	turns taken in Janggi or Go
수	首	su	su	poems, songs; also animals
술		sul	sul	spoonfuls of food
시	時	si	si	hour (of the day)
시간	時間	sigan	sigan	hours (in length)
알		al	al	small, round objects (especially fruits) or grains
옴큼		omkeum	omk'ŭm	handfuls
자루		jaru	charu	things with long handles (writing instruments, shovels, swords, and rifles), and by extension, knives and pistols
장	張	jang	chang	thin, flat objects (such as sheets of paper, glass, steel)
정	錠	jeong	chŏng	tablets of medicine
점		jeom	chŏm	artworks, very small amounts, pieces of sliced or ripped-off flesh, drops of rain, stones in the game of Go on the board or captured from the opponent, or wisps of clouds or wind
제	劑	je	che	dosage of traditional medicine
줄		jul	chul	lines or things aligned in a row (kimbap, desks, chairs, etc.)
쪽		jjok	jjok	pieces
채		chae	ch'ae	houses (also buildings, large objects, furniture, blankets)
척	隻	cheok	ch'ŏk	boats and ships
첩	貼	cheop	ch'ŏp	packs of Korean herbal medicine
탕	趟	tang	t'ang	number of times doing something, especially number of trips made
톨		tol	t'ol	grains
통	通	tong	t'ong	letters, telegrams, telephone calls, e-mails, documents
통		tong	t'ong	watermelons
판		pan	p'an	number of games won or lost
편	篇	pyeon	p'yŏn	books, literary works, movies, plays, etc.
포기		pogi	p'ogi	Chinese cabbages
푼		pun	p'un	pennies
필	匹	pil	p'il	uncut fabric, horses
필지	筆地	pilji	p'ilji	fields, housing sites, etc.
해		hae	hae	earth's revolutions around the sun

Some count words take Sino-Korean numerals:

Hangul	Hanja	RR	MR	Usage
개년	個年	gaenyeon	kaenyŏn	years
개월	個月	gaewol	kaewŏl	months
과	課	gwa	kwa	lesson number (native Korean for number of lessons)
교	校	gyo	kyo	number of times a draft has been proofread
교시	校時	gyosi	kyosi	class number, class period number
년	年	nyeon	nyŏn	year (for dates; 2014년, 1998년)
무	無	mu	mu	ties (in a game)
범	犯	beom	pŏm	penalties for a major crime
분	分	bun	pun	minute (of an hour)
불	弗	bul	pul	dollar
석	席	seok	sŏk	seats
선	選	seon	sŏn	number of times elected to office; which term in a sequence a person has been in office
승	勝	seung	sŭng	victories (in sports)
실	室	sil	sil	rooms
원	圓	won	wŏn	won
월	月	wol	wŏl	month (for dates; 일월: January, 이월: February, ...; note that 6월 is written and pronounced 유월 and 10월 is likewise 시월)
위	位	wi	wi	of rank or order (e.g. 1위 = first rank or order)
일	日	il	il	day (for dates)
점	點	jeom	chŏm	grade (100점)
조	條	jo	cho	article or clause
주기	周忌	jugi	chugi	years since a person's death (used on that death's anniversary)
주일	週日	ju-il	chuil	weeks
집	輯	jip	chip	publication number (e.g. Opus number, album, magazine issue)
초	秒	cho	ch'o	second (of a minute)
촉	燭	chok	ch'ok	candela
촌	寸	chon	ch'on	degree of kinship; also a short unit of measurement, comparable to an inch
탄	彈	tan	t'an	number of a work in a series
호	戶	ho	ho	houses
회	回	hoe	hoe	number of times

Some nouns can also function as counter words. Nouns that were already listed are not included:

Hangul	Hanja	RR	MR	Usage
곡	曲	gok	kok	songs
그릇		geureut	kŭrŭt	bowls
병	甁	byeong	pyŏng	bottles
마디		madi	madi	phrases, joints, body segments, musical measures, words
사람		saram	saram	people (informal)
상자	箱子	sangja	sangja	boxes
잔	盞	jan	chan	cups and glasses
층	層	cheung	ch'ŭng	floors (of a building), layers
통	桶	tong	t'ong	containers, buckets

Some words are used for counting in multiples:

Hangul	Hanja	RR	MR	Usage
급	級	geup	kŭp	20 fish
다스		daseu	tasŭ	dozen (abbreviated from English)
보루		boru	poru	bundle of 10 packs of cigarettes (Note: Typically, there are 20 cigarettes in a pack, and 10 packs in a bundle. 담배 스무 개비 = 담배 한 갑(匣), 담배 열 갑 = 담배 한 보루)
바리		bari	pari	2,000 fish
손		son	son	handfuls of fish (2 large, 4-5 small), typically mackerels or yellow croakers
우리		uri	uri	2,000 tiles
접		jeop	chŏp	100 fruits (for example, dried persimmons), radishes, cabbages, or bulbs of garlic
족	足	jok	chok	pairs (for items likes socks, shoes, gloves, etc.)
축		chuk	ch'uk	20 cuttlefish
켤레		kyeolle	k'yŏlle	pairs of socks, shoes, gloves
코		ko	k'o	twenty dried pollock
타	打	ta	t'a	dozen
톳		tot	t'ot	one hundred sheets of laver
판	板	pan	p'an	thirty eggs

== See also ==
- Measure word
- Classifier (linguistics)
