= When It Rains (Brad Mehldau song) =

Composition by Brad Mehldau

from the album Largo
- Released: 2002
- Recorded: April 2–8, 2001. Hollywood, California, U.S.
- Genre: Jazz
- Label: Warner Bros.
- Composer(s): Brad Mehldau
- Producer(s): Jon Brion

"When It Rains" is a composition by Brad Mehldau. His original version, for the 2002 album Largo, was recorded on April 2–8, 2001.

== Composition and original recording ==
The piece was first recorded on April 2–8, 2001, by Mehldau (piano), Larry Grenadier (bass), Matt Chamberlain (drums), Steve Kujala and David Shostac (flute), Jon Clark and Earle Dumler (oboe), Gary Gray and Emile Bernstein (clarinet), and Peter Mandell and Rose Corrigan (bassoon). It was released as part of the Warner Bros. album Largo.

The piano introduction is joined by wind orchestration. Then "Mehldau's droning left-hand triplets" imitate the sound of rain; "his mood is lonesome and melancholic, but his phrases end with a sense of optimism". The performance ends with a piano "solo reprise of the introduction". Some of the drumming also features some "3-over-4 polyrhythms". Unlike other pieces from Largo, "When It Rains" is acoustic.
