= South Korean standard language =

Standard form of Korean in South Korea

The South Korean standard language or Pyojuneo (Korean: 표준어; Hanja: 標準語; lit. ''Standard language'') is the South Korean standard version of the Korean language. It is based on the Seoul dialect, although various words are borrowed from other regional dialects. It uses the Korean alphabet, created in December 1443 CE by the Joseon-era king Sejong the Great. Unlike the North Korean standard language (문화어; Munhwaŏ), the South Korean standard language includes many Sino-Korean words (i.e., loan-words from Chinese or Japanese), as well as some from English and other European languages.

== History ==
When Korea was under Japanese rule, the use of the Korean language was regulated by the Japanese government. To counter the influence of the Japanese authorities, the Korean Language Society (한글 학회) began collecting dialect data from all over Korea and later created their own standard version of Korean, Pyojuneo, with the release of their book Unification of Korean Spellings (한글 맞춤법 통일안) in 1933. On January 19, 1988, the Ministry of Education issued the Regulations of the Standard Language, Ministry of Education Announcement No. 88-2 (표준어 규정 (문교부 고시 제88-2호)) to establish the modern standard Korean, it was later amended on March 28, 2017 via Ministry of Culture, Sports and Tourism Announcement No. 2017-13 (표준어 규정 (일부 개정안 문화체육관광부 고시 제2017-13호)).

== See also ==
- North–South differences in the Korean language
- Korean language
