= Hangul Compatibility Jamo =

- Range: U+3130..U+318F (96 code points)
- Plane: BMP
- Scripts: Hangul
- Major alphabets: Hangul
- Assigned: 94 code points
- Unused: 2 reserved code points
- Source standards: KS X 1001 (formerly KS C 5601)

Unicode Version History
- 1.0.0 (1991): 94 (+94)

Unicode documentation
- Code chart ∣ Web page

Graphical representation of the Hangul Compatibility Jamo Unicode block

Hangul Compatibility Jamo is a Unicode block containing Hangul characters for compatibility with the South Korean national standard KS X 1001 (formerly KS C 5601). Its block name in Unicode 1.0 was Hangul Elements.

Unlike the characters in the Hangul Jamo block (U+1100–U+11FF), the characters in this Unicode block do not distinguish initial consonants and final consonants, nor do they have conjoining semantics.

== Block ==
Hangul Compatibility Jamo^{[1]}^{[2]} Official Unicode Consortium code chart (PDF)
	0	1	2	3	4	5	6	7	8	9	A	B	C	D	E	F
U+313x		ㄱ	ㄲ	ㄳ	ㄴ	ㄵ	ㄶ	ㄷ	ㄸ	ㄹ	ㄺ	ㄻ	ㄼ	ㄽ	ㄾ	ㄿ
U+314x	ㅀ	ㅁ	ㅂ	ㅃ	ㅄ	ㅅ	ㅆ	ㅇ	ㅈ	ㅉ	ㅊ	ㅋ	ㅌ	ㅍ	ㅎ	ㅏ
U+315x	ㅐ	ㅑ	ㅒ	ㅓ	ㅔ	ㅕ	ㅖ	ㅗ	ㅘ	ㅙ	ㅚ	ㅛ	ㅜ	ㅝ	ㅞ	ㅟ
U+316x	ㅠ	ㅡ	ㅢ	ㅣ	HF	ㅥ	ㅦ	ㅧ	ㅨ	ㅩ	ㅪ	ㅫ	ㅬ	ㅭ	ㅮ	ㅯ
U+317x	ㅰ	ㅱ	ㅲ	ㅳ	ㅴ	ㅵ	ㅶ	ㅷ	ㅸ	ㅹ	ㅺ	ㅻ	ㅼ	ㅽ	ㅾ	ㅿ
U+318x	ㆀ	ㆁ	ㆂ	ㆃ	ㆄ	ㆅ	ㆆ	ㆇ	ㆈ	ㆉ	ㆊ	ㆋ	ㆌ	ㆍ	ㆎ	
Notes 1.As of Unicode version 17.0 2.Grey areas indicate non-assigned code points

== History ==
The following Unicode-related documents record the purpose and process of defining specific characters in the Hangul Compatibility Jamo block:

Version	Final code points (Note: Proposed code points and characters names may differ from final code points and names)	Count	L2 ID	WG2 ID	Document
1.0.0	U+3131..318E	94			(to be determined)
1.0.0	U+3131..318E	94	L2/07-075	N3172	Kim, Kyongsok (2006-09-27), Add annotations for existing 5 Hangul Jamo names
1.0.0	U+3131..318E	94	L2/07-247	N3257	"3", A Proposal to add new Hangul Jamo extended characters to BMP of UCS, 2007-04-23
1.0.0	U+3131..318E	94	L2/09-096		Sung, Ienup (2009-02-26), Change Proposal for Informative Alias of U+3164 HANGUL FILLER
1.0.0	U+3131..318E	94	L2/09-104		Moore, Lisa (2009-05-20), "Scripts — Informative Alias of U+3164 HANGUL FILLER", UTC #119 / L2 #216 Minutes
