= Hangul Jamo (Unicode block) =

- Range: U+1100..U+11FF (256 code points)
- Plane: BMP
- Scripts: Hangul
- Major alphabets: Hangul
- Assigned: 256 code points
- Unused: 0 reserved code points

Unicode version history
- 1.1 (1993): 240 (+240)
- 5.2 (2009): 256 (+16)

Unicode documentation
- Code chart ∣ Web page

Graphical representation of the Hangul Jamo Unicode block

Hangul Jamo is a Unicode block containing positional (choseong, jungseong, and jongseong) forms of Hangul consonant and vowel clusters (jamo). While the Hangul Syllables Unicode block contains precomposed syllables used in standard modern Korean, the Hangul Jamo block can be used to compose arbitrary syllables dynamically, including those not included in the Hangul Syllables block.

In Unicode normalization forms C and KC (NFC and NFKC), the character sequence [ᄀ-ᄒ][ᅡ-ᅵ][ᆨ-ᇂ]? (one character from U+1100 to U+1112, and then one character from U+1161 to U+1175, and then optionally one character from U+11A8 to U+11C2) is converted to a single character in the Hangul Syllables Unicode block (e.g. ᄉ+ᅫ+ᆵ (U+1109, U+116B, U+11B5) → 쇒 (U+C1D2)).

== Block ==
Hangul Jamo^{[1]} Official Unicode Consortium code chart (PDF)
	0	1	2	3	4	5	6	7	8	9	A	B	C	D	E	F
U+110x	ᄀ	ᄁ	ᄂ	ᄃ	ᄄ	ᄅ	ᄆ	ᄇ	ᄈ	ᄉ	ᄊ	ᄋ	ᄌ	ᄍ	ᄎ	ᄏ
U+111x	ᄐ	ᄑ	ᄒ	ᄓ	ᄔ	ᄕ	ᄖ	ᄗ	ᄘ	ᄙ	ᄚ	ᄛ	ᄜ	ᄝ	ᄞ	ᄟ
U+112x	ᄠ	ᄡ	ᄢ	ᄣ	ᄤ	ᄥ	ᄦ	ᄧ	ᄨ	ᄩ	ᄪ	ᄫ	ᄬ	ᄭ	ᄮ	ᄯ
U+113x	ᄰ	ᄱ	ᄲ	ᄳ	ᄴ	ᄵ	ᄶ	ᄷ	ᄸ	ᄹ	ᄺ	ᄻ	ᄼ	ᄽ	ᄾ	ᄿ
U+114x	ᅀ	ᅁ	ᅂ	ᅃ	ᅄ	ᅅ	ᅆ	ᅇ	ᅈ	ᅉ	ᅊ	ᅋ	ᅌ	ᅍ	ᅎ	ᅏ
U+115x	ᅐ	ᅑ	ᅒ	ᅓ	ᅔ	ᅕ	ᅖ	ᅗ	ᅘ	ᅙ	ᅚ	ᅛ	ᅜ	ᅝ	ᅞ	HC; F
U+116x	HJ; F	ᅡ	ᅢ	ᅣ	ᅤ	ᅥ	ᅦ	ᅧ	ᅨ	ᅩ	ᅪ	ᅫ	ᅬ	ᅭ	ᅮ	ᅯ
U+117x	ᅰ	ᅱ	ᅲ	ᅳ	ᅴ	ᅵ	ᅶ	ᅷ	ᅸ	ᅹ	ᅺ	ᅻ	ᅼ	ᅽ	ᅾ	ᅿ
U+118x	ᆀ	ᆁ	ᆂ	ᆃ	ᆄ	ᆅ	ᆆ	ᆇ	ᆈ	ᆉ	ᆊ	ᆋ	ᆌ	ᆍ	ᆎ	ᆏ
U+119x	ᆐ	ᆑ	ᆒ	ᆓ	ᆔ	ᆕ	ᆖ	ᆗ	ᆘ	ᆙ	ᆚ	ᆛ	ᆜ	ᆝ	ᆞ	ᆟ
U+11Ax	ᆠ	ᆡ	ᆢ	ᆣ	ᆤ	ᆥ	ᆦ	ᆧ	ᆨ	ᆩ	ᆪ	ᆫ	ᆬ	ᆭ	ᆮ	ᆯ
U+11Bx	ᆰ	ᆱ	ᆲ	ᆳ	ᆴ	ᆵ	ᆶ	ᆷ	ᆸ	ᆹ	ᆺ	ᆻ	ᆼ	ᆽ	ᆾ	ᆿ
U+11Cx	ᇀ	ᇁ	ᇂ	ᇃ	ᇄ	ᇅ	ᇆ	ᇇ	ᇈ	ᇉ	ᇊ	ᇋ	ᇌ	ᇍ	ᇎ	ᇏ
U+11Dx	ᇐ	ᇑ	ᇒ	ᇓ	ᇔ	ᇕ	ᇖ	ᇗ	ᇘ	ᇙ	ᇚ	ᇛ	ᇜ	ᇝ	ᇞ	ᇟ
U+11Ex	ᇠ	ᇡ	ᇢ	ᇣ	ᇤ	ᇥ	ᇦ	ᇧ	ᇨ	ᇩ	ᇪ	ᇫ	ᇬ	ᇭ	ᇮ	ᇯ
U+11Fx	ᇰ	ᇱ	ᇲ	ᇳ	ᇴ	ᇵ	ᇶ	ᇷ	ᇸ	ᇹ	ᇺ	ᇻ	ᇼ	ᇽ	ᇾ	ᇿ
Notes 1.As of Unicode version 17.0: 2. Yellow background: Modern-usage characters which can be converted into precomposed Hangul syllables under Unicode normalization forms C and KC (NFC and NFKC).; Other characters are used for archaic Korean only, and there are no corresponding precomposed Hangul syllables. "Conjoining Jamo Behavior" (PDF). The Unicode Standard. March 2020.

== History ==
The following Unicode-related documents record the purpose and process of defining specific characters in the Hangul Jamo block:

Version	Final code points (Note: Proposed code points and characters names may differ from final code points and names)	Count	L2 ID	WG2 ID	Document
1.1	U+1100..1159, 115F..11A2, 11A8..11F9	240			(to be determined)
1.1	U+1100..1159, 115F..11A2, 11A8..11F9	240		N767	Ksar, Mike (1991-11-25), Unconfirmed minutes WG2-Paris meeting of October 1991
1.1	U+1100..1159, 115F..11A2, 11A8..11F9	240	L2/05-379		Muller, Eric (2005-12-05), Proposal to add the property Jamo_Short_Name property
1.1	U+1100..1159, 115F..11A2, 11A8..11F9	240	L2/06-008R2		Moore, Lisa (2006-02-13), "Jamo_Short_Name property (B.14.3)", UTC #106 Minutes
1.1	U+1100..1159, 115F..11A2, 11A8..11F9	240	L2/07-075	N3172	Kim, Kyongsok (2006-09-27), Add annotations for existing 5 Hangul Jamo names
1.1	U+1100..1159, 115F..11A2, 11A8..11F9	240	L2/07-247	N3257	"3", A Proposal to add new Hangul Jamo extended characters to BMP of UCS, 2007-04-23
1.1	U+1100..1159, 115F..11A2, 11A8..11F9	240	L2/16-363		Chung, Jaemin (2016-11-08), Proposal to add formal aliases to U+11EC through U+11EF
1.1	U+1100..1159, 115F..11A2, 11A8..11F9	240	L2/16-325		Moore, Lisa (2016-11-18), "B.14.10", UTC #149 Minutes
5.2	U+115A..115E, 11A3..11A7, 11FA..11FF	16		N3168R	Kim, Kyongsok (2006-04-23), A Proposal to add new Hangul Jamo extended characters to BMP of UCS
5.2	U+115A..115E, 11A3..11A7, 11FA..11FF	16	L2/07-076	N3168	Kim, Kyongsok (2006-09-27), A Proposal to add new Hangul Jamo extended characters to BMP of UCS
5.2	U+115A..115E, 11A3..11A7, 11FA..11FF	16		N3153 (pdf, doc)	Umamaheswaran, V. S. (2007-02-16), "M49.23", Unconfirmed minutes of WG 2 meeting 49 AIST, Akihabara, Tokyo, Japan; 2006-09-25/29
5.2	U+115A..115E, 11A3..11A7, 11FA..11FF	16	L2/07-103	N3242	Proposed allocation of Old Hangul Jamos in the BMP, 2007-04-16
5.2	U+115A..115E, 11A3..11A7, 11FA..11FF	16	L2/07-247	N3257	"2", A Proposal to add new Hangul Jamo extended characters to BMP of UCS, 2007-04-23
5.2	U+115A..115E, 11A3..11A7, 11FA..11FF	16	L2/07-118R2		Moore, Lisa (2007-05-23), "111-C17", UTC #111 Minutes
5.2	U+115A..115E, 11A3..11A7, 11FA..11FF	16	L2/07-268	N3253 (pdf, doc)	Umamaheswaran, V. S. (2007-07-26), "M50.34", Unconfirmed minutes of WG 2 meeting 50, Frankfurt-am-Main, Germany; 2007-04-24/27
5.2	U+115A..115E, 11A3..11A7, 11FA..11FF	16	L2/08-003		Moore, Lisa (2008-02-14), "Consensus 114-C28a", UTC #114 Minutes, "Correct the names of 3 Hangul characters as approved by prior WG2 resolution..."
5.2	U+115A..115E, 11A3..11A7, 11FA..11FF	16	L2/08-318	N3453 (pdf, doc)	Umamaheswaran, V. S. (2008-08-13), "M52.2d", Unconfirmed minutes of WG 2 meeting 52
5.2	U+115A..115E, 11A3..11A7, 11FA..11FF	16	L2/08-161R2		Moore, Lisa (2008-11-05), "Consensus 115-C15", UTC #115 Minutes, "Approve 4 character name corrections..."

== See also ==
- Hangul Jamo Extended-A
- Hangul Jamo Extended-B
- CJK Symbols and Punctuation (Unicode block)
- Enclosed CJK Letters and Months (Unicode block)
