= List of Hangul jamo =

This is a list of jamo (letters) in the Korean alphabetic script Hangul. It includes jamo that are no longer used and Unicode code points.

Hangul jamo characters in Unicode

Hangul Compatibility Jamo block in Unicode

Halfwidth Hangul jamo characters in Unicode

In the lists below, code points highlighted with yellow background are part of the modern Hangul subset.

- In Unicode normalization forms C and KC (NFC and NFKC), the character sequence [ᄀ-ᄒ][ᅡ-ᅵ][ᆨ-ᇂ]? (one character from U+1100 to U+1112, and then one character from U+1161 to U+1175, and then optionally one character from U+11A8 to U+11C2) is converted to a single character in the Hangul Syllables Unicode block (e.g. ᄉ+ᅫ+ᆵ (U+1109, U+116B, U+11B5) → 쇒 (U+C1D2)).

All other jamo (shown in the tables below without the yellow background) are obsolete; they are not used in modern Korean (most Korean input methods or keyboard layout do not allow entering them).

Code points highlighted with lime background are jamo that look like a character in modern use but not used in choseong/jongseong positions.

The Hangul compatibility jamo characters (U+3130–U+318F) are encoded in Unicode for compatibility with the earlier South Korean national standard KS X 1001 (formerly KS C 5601). Compatibility and halfwidth (U+FFA0–U+FFDC) characters are not composable into syllabic squares (because of the ambiguity for delimiting syllables when using them), but they may be used in legacy applications which cannot support or render the full Hangul syllable set such as low-cost terminals or old printers: these compatibility characters may exist either in fullwidth variant, or in halfwidth variants (mostly used in terminals with low resolution).

== Consonants ==
Sort order of Hangul consonants defined in the South Korean national standard KS X 1026-1

Hangul Compatibility	Hangul Jamo block		Halfwidth
Hangul Compatibility	Leading	Trailing	Halfwidth
ㄱ U+3131	ᄀ U+1100	ᆨ U+11A8	ﾡ U+FFA1
ㄲ U+3132	ᄁ U+1101	ᆩ U+11A9	ﾢ U+FFA2
—	—	ᇺ U+11FA	—
—	ᅚ U+115A	—	—
—	—	ᇃ U+11C3	—
—	—	ᇻ U+11FB	—
ㄳ U+3133	—	ᆪ U+11AA	ﾣ U+FFA3
—	—	ᇄ U+11C4	—
—	—	ᇼ U+11FC	—
—	—	ᇽ U+11FD	—
—	—	ᇾ U+11FE	—
ㄴ U+3134	ᄂ U+1102	ᆫ U+11AB	ﾤ U+FFA4
—	ᄓ U+1113	ᇅ U+11C5	—
ㅥ U+3165	ᄔ U+1114	ᇿ U+11FF	—
ㅦ U+3166	ᄕ U+1115	ᇆ U+11C6	—
—	—	ퟋ U+D7CB	—
—	ᄖ U+1116	—	—
ㅧ U+3167	ᅛ U+115B	ᇇ U+11C7	—
ㅨ U+3168	—	ᇈ U+11C8	—
ㄵ U+3135	ᅜ U+115C	ᆬ U+11AC	ﾥ U+FFA5
—	—	ퟌ U+D7CC	—
—	—	ᇉ U+11C9	—
ㄶ U+3136	ᅝ U+115D	ᆭ U+11AD	ﾦ U+FFA6
ㄷ U+3137	ᄃ U+1103	ᆮ U+11AE	ﾧ U+FFA7
—	ᄗ U+1117	ᇊ U+11CA	—
ㄸ U+3138	ᄄ U+1104	ퟍ U+D7CD	ﾨ U+FFA8
—	—	ퟎ U+D7CE	—
—	ᅞ U+115E	ᇋ U+11CB	—
—	ꥠ U+A960	—	—
—	ꥡ U+A961	ퟏ U+D7CF	—
—	ꥢ U+A962	ퟐ U+D7D0	—
—	—	ퟑ U+D7D1	—
—	ꥣ U+A963	ퟒ U+D7D2	—
—	—	ퟓ U+D7D3	—
—	—	ퟔ U+D7D4	—
ㄹ U+3139	ᄅ U+1105	ᆯ U+11AF	ﾩ U+FFA9
ㄺ U+313A	ꥤ U+A964	ᆰ U+11B0	ﾪ U+FFAA
—	ꥥ U+A965	ퟕ U+D7D5	—
ㅩ U+3169	—	ᇌ U+11CC	—
—	—	ퟖ U+D7D6	—
—	ᄘ U+1118	ᇍ U+11CD	—
ㅪ U+316A	ꥦ U+A966	ᇎ U+11CE	—
—	ꥧ U+A967	—	—
—	—	ᇏ U+11CF	—
—	ᄙ U+1119	ᇐ U+11D0	—
—	—	ퟗ U+D7D7	—
ㄻ U+313B	ꥨ U+A968	ᆱ U+11B1	ﾫ U+FFAB
—	—	ᇑ U+11D1	—
—	—	ᇒ U+11D2	—
—	—	ퟘ U+D7D8	—
ㄼ U+313C	ꥩ U+A969	ᆲ U+11B2	ﾬ U+FFAC
—	—	ퟙ U+D7D9	—
—	ꥪ U+A96A	—	—
ㅫ U+316B	—	ᇓ U+11D3	—
—	—	ퟚ U+D7DA	—
—	—	ᇔ U+11D4	—
—	ꥫ U+A96B	ᇕ U+11D5	—
ㄽ U+313D	ꥬ U+A96C	ᆳ U+11B3	ﾭ U+FFAD
—	—	ᇖ U+11D6	—
ㅬ U+316C	—	ᇗ U+11D7	—
—	—	ퟛ U+D7DB	—
—	ꥭ U+A96D	—	—
—	ꥮ U+A96E	ᇘ U+11D8	—
ㄾ U+313E	—	ᆴ U+11B4	ﾮ U+FFAE
ㄿ U+313F	—	ᆵ U+11B5	ﾯ U+FFAF
ㅀ U+3140	ᄚ U+111A	ᆶ U+11B6	ﾰ U+FFB0
ㅭ U+316D	—	ᇙ U+11D9	—
—	—	ퟜ U+D7DC	—
—	ᄛ U+111B	ퟝ U+D7DD	—
ㅁ U+3141	ᄆ U+1106	ᆷ U+11B7	ﾱ U+FFB1
—	ꥯ U+A96F	ᇚ U+11DA	—
—	—	ퟞ U+D7DE	—
—	—	ퟟ U+D7DF	—
—	ꥰ U+A970	—	—
—	—	ᇛ U+11DB	—
—	—	ퟠ U+D7E0	—
ㅮ U+316E	ᄜ U+111C	ᇜ U+11DC	—
—	—	ퟡ U+D7E1	—
ㅯ U+316F	ꥱ U+A971	ᇝ U+11DD	—
—	—	ᇞ U+11DE	—
ㅰ U+3170	—	ᇟ U+11DF	—
—	—	ퟢ U+D7E2	—
—	—	ᇠ U+11E0	—
—	—	ᇡ U+11E1	—
ㅱ U+3171	ᄝ U+111D	ᇢ U+11E2	—
ㅂ U+3142	ᄇ U+1107	ᆸ U+11B8	ﾲ U+FFB2
ㅲ U+3172	ᄞ U+111E	—	—
—	ᄟ U+111F	—	—
ㅳ U+3173	ᄠ U+1120	ퟣ U+D7E3	—
—	—	ᇣ U+11E3	—
—	—	ퟤ U+D7E4	—
—	—	ퟥ U+D7E5	—
ㅃ U+3143	ᄈ U+1108	ퟦ U+D7E6	ﾳ U+FFB3
ㅄ U+3144	ᄡ U+1121	ᆹ U+11B9	ﾴ U+FFB4
ㅴ U+3174	ᄢ U+1122	—	—
ㅵ U+3175	ᄣ U+1123	ퟧ U+D7E7	—
—	ᄤ U+1124	—	—
—	ᄥ U+1125	—	—
—	ᄦ U+1126	—	—
—	ꥲ U+A972	—	—
ㅶ U+3176	ᄧ U+1127	ퟨ U+D7E8	—
—	ᄨ U+1128	ퟩ U+D7E9	—
—	ꥳ U+A973	—	—
ㅷ U+3177	ᄩ U+1129	—	—
—	ᄪ U+112A	ᇤ U+11E4	—
—	ꥴ U+A974	ᇥ U+11E5	—
ㅸ U+3178	ᄫ U+112B	ᇦ U+11E6	—
ㅹ U+3179	ᄬ U+112C	—	—
ㅅ U+3145	ᄉ U+1109	ᆺ U+11BA	ﾵ U+FFB5
ㅺ U+317A	ᄭ U+112D	ᇧ U+11E7	—
ㅻ U+317B	ᄮ U+112E	—	—
ㅼ U+317C	ᄯ U+112F	ᇨ U+11E8	—
—	ᄰ U+1130	ᇩ U+11E9	—
—	ᄱ U+1131	ퟪ U+D7EA	—
ㅽ U+317D	ᄲ U+1132	ᇪ U+11EA	—
—	ᄳ U+1133	—	—
—	—	ퟫ U+D7EB	—
ㅆ U+3146	ᄊ U+110A	ᆻ U+11BB	ﾶ U+FFB6
—	—	ퟬ U+D7EC	—
—	—	ퟭ U+D7ED	—
—	ꥵ U+A975	—	—
—	ᄴ U+1134	—	—
—	—	ퟮ U+D7EE	—
—	ᄵ U+1135	—	—
ㅾ U+317E	ᄶ U+1136	ퟯ U+D7EF	—
—	ᄷ U+1137	ퟰ U+D7F0	—
—	ᄸ U+1138	—	—
—	ᄹ U+1139	ퟱ U+D7F1	—
—	ᄺ U+113A	—	—
—	ᄻ U+113B	ퟲ U+D7F2	—
—	ᄼ U+113C	—	—
—	ᄽ U+113D	—	—
—	ᄾ U+113E	—	—
—	ᄿ U+113F	—	—
ㅿ U+317F	ᅀ U+1140	ᇫ U+11EB	—
—	—	ퟳ U+D7F3	—
—	—	ퟴ U+D7F4	—
ㅇ U+3147	ᄋ U+110B	ᆼ U+11BC	ﾷ U+FFB7
—	ᅁ U+1141	—	—
—	ᅂ U+1142	—	—
—	ꥶ U+A976	—	—
—	ᅃ U+1143	—	—
—	ᅄ U+1144	—	—
—	ᅅ U+1145	—	—
—	ᅆ U+1146	—	—
ㆀ U+3180	ᅇ U+1147	—	—
—	ᅈ U+1148	—	—
—	ᅉ U+1149	—	—
—	ᅊ U+114A	—	—
—	ᅋ U+114B	—	—
—	ꥷ U+A977	—	—
ㆁ U+3181	ᅌ U+114C	ᇰ U+11F0	—
—	—	ᇬ U+11EC	—
—	—	ᇭ U+11ED	—
—	—	ퟵ U+D7F5	—
ㆂ U+3182	—	ᇱ U+11F1	—
ㆃ U+3183	—	ᇲ U+11F2	—
—	—	ᇮ U+11EE	—
—	—	ᇯ U+11EF	—
—	—	ퟶ U+D7F6	—
ㅈ U+3148	ᄌ U+110C	ᆽ U+11BD	ﾸ U+FFB8
—	—	ퟷ U+D7F7	—
—	—	ퟸ U+D7F8	—
—	ᅍ U+114D	—	—
ㅉ U+3149	ᄍ U+110D	ퟹ U+D7F9	ﾹ U+FFB9
—	ꥸ U+A978	—	—
—	ᅎ U+114E	—	—
—	ᅏ U+114F	—	—
—	ᅐ U+1150	—	—
—	ᅑ U+1151	—	—
ㅊ U+314A	ᄎ U+110E	ᆾ U+11BE	ﾺ U+FFBA
—	ᅒ U+1152	—	—
—	ᅓ U+1153	—	—
—	ᅔ U+1154	—	—
—	ᅕ U+1155	—	—
ㅋ U+314B	ᄏ U+110F	ᆿ U+11BF	ﾻ U+FFBB
ㅌ U+314C	ᄐ U+1110	ᇀ U+11C0	ﾼ U+FFBC
—	ꥹ U+A979	—	—
ㅍ U+314D	ᄑ U+1111	ᇁ U+11C1	ﾽ U+FFBD
—	ᅖ U+1156	ᇳ U+11F3	—
—	—	ퟺ U+D7FA	—
—	—	ퟻ U+D7FB	—
—	ꥺ U+A97A	—	—
ㆄ U+3184	ᅗ U+1157	ᇴ U+11F4	—
ㅎ U+314E	ᄒ U+1112	ᇂ U+11C2	ﾾ U+FFBE
—	—	ᇵ U+11F5	—
—	—	ᇶ U+11F6	—
—	—	ᇷ U+11F7	—
—	—	ᇸ U+11F8	—
—	ꥻ U+A97B	—	—
ㆅ U+3185	ᅘ U+1158	—	—
ㆆ U+3186	ᅙ U+1159	ᇹ U+11F9	—
—	ꥼ U+A97C	—	—

== Vowels ==
Sort order of Hangul vowels defined in the South Korean national standard KS X 1026-1

Hangul Compatibility	Hangul Jamo block	Halfwidth
ㅏ U+314F	ᅡ U+1161	ￂ U+FFC2
—	ᅶ U+1176	—
—	ᅷ U+1177	—
—	ᆣ U+11A3	—
ㅐ U+3150	ᅢ U+1162	ￃ U+FFC3
ㅑ U+3151	ᅣ U+1163	ￄ U+FFC4
—	ᅸ U+1178	—
—	ᅹ U+1179	—
—	ᆤ U+11A4	—
ㅒ U+3152	ᅤ U+1164	ￅ U+FFC5
ㅓ U+3153	ᅥ U+1165	ￆ U+FFC6
—	ᅺ U+117A	—
—	ᅻ U+117B	—
—	ᅼ U+117C	—
ㅔ U+3154	ᅦ U+1166	ￇ U+FFC7
ㅕ U+3155	ᅧ U+1167	ￊ U+FFCA
—	ᆥ U+11A5	—
—	ᅽ U+117D	—
—	ᅾ U+117E	—
ㅖ U+3156	ᅨ U+1168	ￋ U+FFCB
ㅗ U+3157	ᅩ U+1169	ￌ U+FFCC
ㅘ U+3158	ᅪ U+116A	ￍ U+FFCD
ㅙ U+3159	ᅫ U+116B	ￎ U+FFCE
—	ᆦ U+11A6	—
—	ᆧ U+11A7	—
—	ᅿ U+117F	—
—	ᆀ U+1180	—
—	ힰ U+D7B0	—
—	ᆁ U+1181	—
—	ᆂ U+1182	—
—	ힱ U+D7B1	—
—	ᆃ U+1183	—
ㅚ U+315A	ᅬ U+116C	ￏ U+FFCF
ㅛ U+315B	ᅭ U+116D	ￒ U+FFD2
—	ힲ U+D7B2	—
—	ힳ U+D7B3	—
ㆇ U+3187	ᆄ U+1184	—
ㆈ U+3188	ᆅ U+1185	—
—	ힴ U+D7B4	—
—	ᆆ U+1186	—
—	ᆇ U+1187	—
ㆉ U+3189	ᆈ U+1188	—
ㅜ U+315C	ᅮ U+116E	ￓ U+FFD3
—	ᆉ U+1189	—
—	ᆊ U+118A	—
ㅝ U+315D	ᅯ U+116F	ￔ U+FFD4
—	ᆋ U+118B	—
ㅞ U+315E	ᅰ U+1170	ￕ U+FFD5
—	ힵ U+D7B5	—
—	ᆌ U+118C	—
—	ᆍ U+118D	—
ㅟ U+315F	ᅱ U+1171	ￖ U+FFD6
—	ힶ U+D7B6	—
ㅠ U+3160	ᅲ U+1172	ￗ U+FFD7
—	ᆎ U+118E	—
—	ힷ U+D7B7	—
—	ᆏ U+118F	—
—	ᆐ U+1190	—
ㆊ U+318A	ᆑ U+1191	—
ㆋ U+318B	ᆒ U+1192	—
—	ힸ U+D7B8	—
—	ᆓ U+1193	—
ㆌ U+318C	ᆔ U+1194	—
ㅡ U+3161	ᅳ U+1173	ￚ U+FFDA
—	ힹ U+D7B9	—
—	ힺ U+D7BA	—
—	ힻ U+D7BB	—
—	ힼ U+D7BC	—
—	ᆕ U+1195	—
—	ᆖ U+1196	—
ㅢ U+3162	ᅴ U+1174	ￛ U+FFDB
—	ᆗ U+1197	—
ㅣ U+3163	ᅵ U+1175	ￜ U+FFDC
—	ᆘ U+1198	—
—	ᆙ U+1199	—
—	ힽ U+D7BD	—
—	ힾ U+D7BE	—
—	ힿ U+D7BF	—
—	ퟀ U+D7C0	—
—	ᆚ U+119A	—
—	ퟁ U+D7C1	—
—	ퟂ U+D7C2	—
—	ᆛ U+119B	—
—	ퟃ U+D7C3	—
—	ᆜ U+119C	—
—	ퟄ U+D7C4	—
—	ᆝ U+119D	—
ㆍ U+318D	ᆞ U+119E	—
—	ퟅ U+D7C5	—
—	ᆟ U+119F	—
—	ퟆ U+D7C6	—
—	ᆠ U+11A0	—
ㆎ U+318E	ᆡ U+11A1	—
—	ᆢ U+11A2	—

== Other characters ==
These are not jamo, but are used in combination with other Hangul jamo characters and syllables.

- Fillers: these are needed to allow correct processing of syllable separations and correct rendering of syllabic clusters in composition squares
  - Hangul Jamo block: U+115F (leading), U+1160 (medial)
  - Hangul Compatibility: U+3164
  - Halfwidth Jamo: U+FFA0
- Tone marks (bangjeom, 방점, 傍點): were used in Middle Korean, written to the left of a syllabic square (but encoded after the leading Hangul jamo or syllable if encoded as a combining diacritic), and was used with the vertical presentation; for example in the Eonhaebon version (mixed Hanja and Hangul) of the Hunminjeongeum Eonhae):
  - Single dot (geoseong, 거성, 去聲) "〮" (·): U+302E (high tone); not to be confused with the obsolete vowel jamo ᆞ (U+119E) (or its corresponding compatibility jamo ㆍ (U+318D)) which is used in a medial or final position of a syllabic square (and appears after leading consonants)
  - Double dot (sangseong, 상성, 上聲) "〯" (:): U+302F (rising tone)
  - The absence of tone mark implied the low tone (pyeongseong, 평성, 平聲).
  Notes: These tone marks are input after the syllabic square they modify but they will be rendered by reordering to the left of the syllabic square. For example, the string "가〮" (U+AC00 U+302E) should be displayed like "·가", not "가·".
  They were first encoded in Unicode as non-spacing combining marks, due to their most common and historic use with the vertical presentation, but they still need to have a positive advance-width to render Middle Korean texts in the modern horizontal presentation (to avoid collision with the previous syllabic square); their general category was later changed from Mn to Mc (spacing combining mark), even though they don't add any advance-width in the traditional vertical presentation.
  Legacy encodings before they were encoded in Unicode, or if a font does not support glyphs for them, used generic punctuation marks (middle dot "·", or colon ":") input before the syllabic square (but this causes confusion when parsing text, and they do not work well for the vertical presentation because they would render above the next syllabic square instead of to the left).
