= Obsolete Hangul jamo =

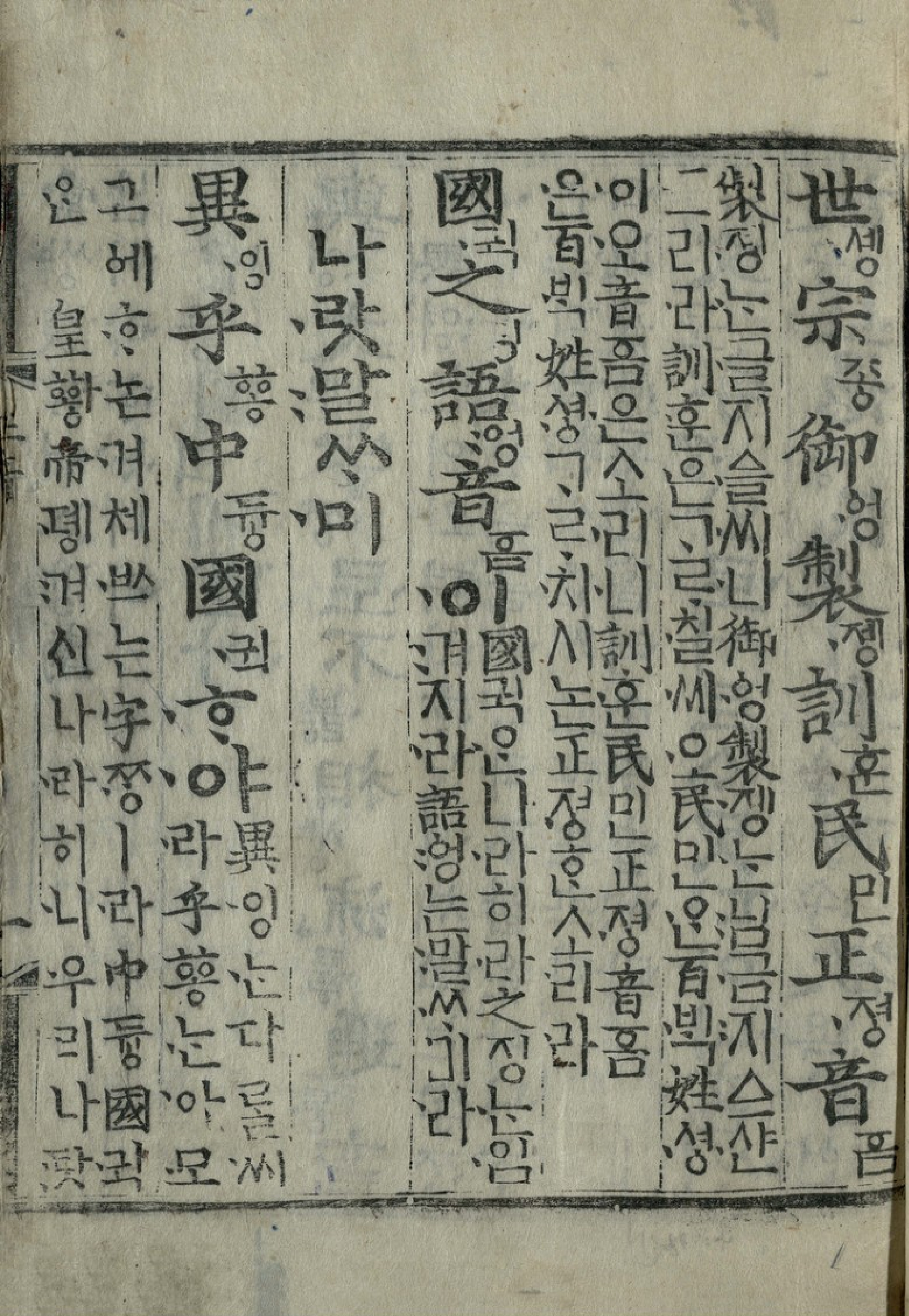
The first page of the text Hunminjeongeum Eonhae shows some obsolete Hangul letters in use

The Korean alphabet, known as Hangul internationally, Hangeul in South Korea, and Choson'gŭl in North Korea, was introduced with 28 main letters, which are called jamo. Other extended vowels and consonants also existed or were later introduced but faded from use. Now, 24 main letters are in use for modern Korean.

A number of letters that became obsolete for Korean have previously and even currently seen use for other languages. For example, ㆍ is obsolete for Korean but used for the Jeju language.

Many obsolete letters and combinations are accounted for in Unicode.

== Obsolete base letters ==
- ㆁ ([ŋ]) is a consonant that represented an ng sound. It has a stroke on top, added from ㅇ, a null or zero initial. They were often confused, as they are so visually similar. In the 15th century, it was used as both as an initial and final consonant. It became final only at the start of the 16th century. By the 17th century, the two letters functionally merged into ㅇ.
- ㅿ ([z]) is a consonant that was a voiced equivalent of ㅅ. Its sound value is controversial, although most scholars believe it to have been [z] in Middle Korean. Its use was generally restricted to the word medial position (i.e. inside a word), although it was sometimes used as the first initial consonant of a word. It fell out of significant use to represent Korean by around the 1570s to 1580s. By this point, its corresponding phoneme had disappeared out of the language.
- ㆆ ([ʔ]) is a consonant that was a glottal stop. It has a stroke added from ㅇ. It was not used much. For Korean, it could be used to indicate preglottalization before a tensed consonant. It largely fell out of use by the end of the 15th century, after which its role was replaced by ㅅ.
- ㆍ ([ʌ] or [ɐ]) is a vowel that was used for the Korean language, although it is still used for the Jeju language (there, it is pronounced [ɔ] or [ʌ]). The letter's sound disappeared gradually from the 16th to 18th centuries, but remained in use in writing. The first orthography to prohibit it was the 1930 Hangul Orthography. The Korean Language Society's 1933 Unified Hangul Orthography also called for its prohibition; its use largely ended with this orthography. Its role has since been replaced with either ㅡ or ㅏ.

== Obsolete doubled consonants ==
- ㆀ had an unclear sound value. It is graphically a doubled form of ㅇ. Lee and Ramsey argue it most likely was used to indicate that the "causative/passive morpheme began with a voiced velar fricative [ɣ]". It mainly occurred in compound verbs, for example 괴ᅇᅧ or ᄆᆡᅇᅵᄂᆞ니라.
- ㆅ had an unclear sound value. It was an initial consonant and graphically a doubled form of ㅎ. It was introduced in the Hunminjeongeum for use in Sino-Korean, but it was very rarely used. Its use was limited to the syllable ᅘᅧ ([xjə]; lit. 'pull'). Within several decades of the promulgation, it virtually ceased to be used at all. Lee and Ramsey claim it continued to see minor use until the 17th century. In the 17th century, ᅘᅧ came to be written as ᄻᅧ. ㆅ's function has been virtually entirely replaced by ㅎ, ㅋ, or ㅆ.
- ꥼ had an unclear sound value. It is graphically a doubled form of ㆆ. There are no records of this character ever being used.
- ㅥ is graphically a doubled form of ㄴ. It is attested to in the Hunminjeongeum Eonhae in the phrase "다ᄔᆞ니라", but Lee and Ramsey argue this is an anomalous spelling variant of "단ᄂᆞ니라". It appeared in the 1676 print of Ch'ŏphae sinŏ to phonetically transcribe the Japanese word nan=no: 나ᄔᅩ.
- ᄙ has been used to transcribe various foreign languages, including Russian.

== Light labial letters ==
The light labial letters, also called yŏnsŏ (연서; 連書), are briefly mentioned in the Hunminjeongeum and expanded upon in the Haerye. They are graphically composed of the labial consonants with a small ㅇ underneath them. All of them, except for ㅸ, were only used for the transcription of Chinese.

- ㅸ ([β]) is graphically composed of ㅂ above a ㅇ. It was an initial consonant used for native Korean sounds, not Chinese. ㅸ largely disappeared from use by the 1460s or by the mid 16th-century. In most situations, it lenited (was replaced with a softer sound) and merged with the semivowel /w/. As examples, 글ᄫᅡᆯ → 글왈 (lit. 'letter') and 더ᄫᅥ → 더워 (lit. 'hot'). It was revived for use in Cia-Cia, where it represents the voiced labiodental fricative.
- ㆄ is graphically composed of a ㅍ above a ㅇ. Linguist Sven Osterkamp argues it was possibly hardly audibly distinguishable from ㅸ, and that etymology would have helped determine which to use. It did not see much use, even to transcribe Chinese. Sin Sukchu, a prominent linguist of Chinese around the 15th century and head of many Hangul-related projects, felt that its corresponding theoretical sound did not exist then in Chinese. The letter saw sparse use to transcribe Japanese in the 1492 work Irop'a, but Osterkamp evaluated its use as "unsystematic".
- ㅱ is composed of a ㅁ above a ㅇ. It was used differently by different authors; some texts used it in either or both of the initial and final positions. Its sound value is the subject of scholarly disagreement. Almost all scholars who've written about this issue have argued it possibly had different sounds in different positions, with various proposals about the sound values. A number of scholars argue that, when it was used in the final position, its sound was functionally that of the semivowel [w]. A number of 15th-century texts had grammatical particles used after vowel sounds applied after the letter when it was used in the final position, and it was often replaced by the vowels ㅜ ([wu]) and ㅗ ([wo]). When used as an initial, various scholars have argued that its sound was the voiced labiodental nasal ([ɱ]), a light voiced bilabial nasal ([m]), or a voiced labiodental approximant semivowel ([ʋ]).
- ◇ ([w]) is a consonant invented by Pak Sŏngwŏn in his 1747 work Hwadongjŏngŭm t'ongsŏgun'go (화동정음통석운고; 華東正音通釋韻考). Scholars believe the character's function overlapped with that of ㅱ. It was used for the transcription of Chinese.

== Pure dental and palatal-supradental sibilants ==
ᄼ ([s, ɕ]), ᄽ ([z, ʑ]), ᅎ ([ts, tɕ]), ᅏ ([dz, tʑ]), ᅔ ([tsʰ, tɕʰ]) and ᄾ ([ʂ]), ᄿ ([ʐ]), ᅐ ([tʂ]), ᅑ ([dʐ]), ᅕ ([tʂʰ]); the former five are pure dental and latter five are palatal-supradental sibilants (Note: Terminology from Ahn. Ledyard calls these "pure dental sibilants and supradental sibilants".) (치두음; 齒頭音 and 정치음; 正齒音). They were exclusively used to transcribe Chinese. They were not a part of the original Hunminjeongeum or Haerye; it is unclear exactly when they were introduced. They appear in the introduction to the text Sasŏng t'onggo (사성통고; 四聲通攷), which was possibly published before 1455, and are attested to in the 1459 Wŏrin sŏkpo edition of the Hunminjeongeum. They do not appear in any other version of the Hunminjeongeum. Scholars assume some scholar other than Sejong, possibly Sin Sukchu, invented these letters and included them in these texts. They are attested to in the 1800 text Hwadong ŭmwŏn (화동음원; 華東音源) by Hong Hŭijun (홍희준; 洪羲俊).

== Heterogeneous initial clusters ==
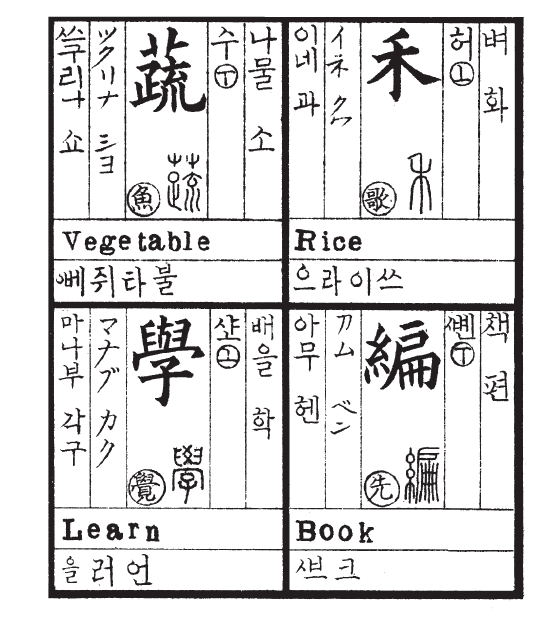
Entries from the 1908 text Ahakp'yŏn. In the top left entry, the unusual heterogeneous cluster ᅄ is being used to represent the English [v] sound.

The current initial consonant clusters in use are doubled letters like ㄲ. The Haerye allowed for the use of initial consonant clusters containing different letters, even up to three letters at a time. Examples include ㅴ, used in ᄢᅳᆷ (lit. 'crack, opening') and the rare ㅻ, used in ᄮᅡᄒᆡ (lit. 'a man'). Such heterogenous initial clusters were common in Middle Korean texts.

The 1908 text Ahakp'yŏn used unusual heterogeneous horizontal clusters beginning with ㅇ to transcribe English. For example, it used ᅋ ([f]) to transcribe "knife": 나이ᅋᅳ.

== Changes in final consonants ==
The letters considered acceptable for use as final consonants have changed over time. The Haerye stipulates that eight basic consonants can be used as finals: ㄱ, ㄴ, ㄷ, ㄹ, ㅁ, ㅂ, ㅅ, and ㅇ. In particular, it argues that ㅅ is sufficient to represent the sounds of the dental sibilants ㅈ, ㅿ, and ㅊ in the final position. The use of these eight finals was strictly abided by in the 15th and 16th centuries, except for in the early works Yongbiŏch'ŏn'ga and Wŏrin ch'ŏn'gangjigok, which were both published in 1447, around the promulgation of Hangul. The unusual orthography in those early texts possibly reflects an early dispute over orthography that was soon resolved. For heterogenous final clusters, there were six in common use (excluding those that include the saisiot): ㄳ, ㅧ, ㄺ, ㄻ, ㄼ, and ㅭ.

== Obsolete vowel clusters ==
Unusual vowel clusters have seen use to transcribe foreign languages. For example, in the 1768 text Mongŏ yuhae (몽어유해; 蒙語類解), vowel clusters like ᅾ and ᅟᆓ were used to transcribe Mongolian.

- ᆢ is a vowel that is graphically a doubled form of ㆍ. It was described as having a heavier and longer sound than ㆍ. It was introduced in Sin Kyŏngjun's 1750 work Hunmin chŏngum unhae. It was also described in Yu Hŭi's 1824 text Ŏnmunji. The intended sound can still be heard in the Jeju language today, for example in the verb "ᄋᆢᆯ다" (in standard Korean "열다"; "to open"). Its sound value likely overlapped with that of ᆝ.
- ᆜ is a combined vowel consisting of, in this order, ㅣ and ㅡ. By contrast, ㅢ is pronounced in the order of ㅡ and ㅣ. It was briefly mentioned in the Haerye as perhaps being useful for transcribing the speech of children or of dialects, but not needed for standard Korean. It was otherwise rarely used.
  - ᆖ is graphically a doubled form of ㅡ. It was introduced in Chi Sŏgyŏng's 1905 New Edition of National Writing (신정국문; 新訂國文). Like ᆜ, it was meant to represent a combined sound of ㅣ and ㅡ, in that order. This character, along with the rest of Chi's orthography, was promulgated into law, but swiftly met with backlash and never fully implemented. In 1907, the government appointed a National Language Research Institute. In 1909, that organization proposed a number of changes to the orthography, including the rejection of ᆖ. Their proposal was never implemented due to Korea's rapid loss of sovereignty around this time.
- ᆝ is a combined vowel consisting of, in this order, ㅣ and ㆍ. Like ᆜ, it was introduced in the Haerye as unnecessary for standard Korean but potentially useful otherwise. It was rarely used. Its sound value likely overlapped with that of ᆢ.
- ㆇ (combined ㅛ and ㅑ) and ㆊ (ㅠ and ㅕ) were introduced in the Haerye exclusively for transcribing Chinese.
