= Hangul letter names =

Names of Korean letters

The Korean alphabet, known as Hangul internationally, Hangeul in South Korea, and Choson'gŭl in North Korea, has had different names applied to its letters throughout its history and even currently.

== Vowel names ==
Since the 1527 work Hunmong chahoe, vowels have been consistently named after the sound they produce if attached to an ㅇ.

Vowel letter names
Vowel	Name	
Hangul	RR	MR
ㅏ	a	a
ㅐ	ae	ae
ㅑ	ya	ya
ㅒ	yae	yae
ㅓ	eo	ŏ
ㅔ	e	e
ㅕ	yeo	yŏ
ㅖ	ye	ye
ㅗ	o	o
ㅘ	wa	wa
ㅙ	wae	wae
ㅚ	oe	oe
ㅛ	yo	yo
ㅜ	u	u
ㅝ	wo	wŏ
ㅞ	we	we
ㅟ	wi	wi
ㅠ	yu	yu
ㅡ	eu	ŭ
ㅢ	ui	ŭi
ㅣ	i	i

== Consonant names ==
Korean consonants
South Korean names of the consonant letters (excluding doubled letters)

Consonants have individual names, although these have varied across time and now between North and South Korea.

Current consonant letter names
Consonant	South Korean name		North Korean name	
Hangul	Hangul	RR	Hangul	MR
ㄱ	기역	giyeok	기윽	kiŭk
ㄲ	쌍기역	ssanggiyeok	된기윽	toen'giŭk
ㄴ	니은	nieun	니은	niŭn
ㄷ	디귿	digeut	디읃	tiŭt
ㄸ	쌍디귿	ssangdigeut	된디읃	toendiŭt
ㄹ	리을	rieul	리을	riŭl
ㅁ	미음	mieum	미음	miŭm
ㅂ	비읍	bieup	비읍	piŭp
ㅃ	쌍비읍	ssangbieup	된비읍	toenbiŭp
ㅅ	시옷	siot	시읏	siŭt
ㅆ	쌍시옷	ssangsiot	된시읏	toensiŭt
ㅇ	이응	ieung	이응	iŭng
ㅈ	지읒	jieut	지읒	chiŭt
ㅉ	쌍지읒	ssangjieut	된지읒	toenjiŭt
ㅊ	치읓	chieut	치읓	ch'iŭt
ㅋ	키읔	kieuk	키읔	k'iŭk
ㅌ	티읕	tieut	티읕	t'iŭt
ㅍ	피읖	pieup	피읖	p'iŭp
ㅎ	히읗	hieut	히읗	hiŭt

=== History ===
Names were not recorded for any of the letters when they were first promulgated in 1446.

A prominent hypothesis (Note: An early attestation to it is a 1943 paper by Hong Kimun (홍기문).) is that the consonants were possibly commonly referred to in the 15th and early 16th centuries by a single syllable containing the corresponding consonant and ㅣ, e.g. gi (기), ni (니), di (디), etc. The hypothesis's reasoning is that, in the Hunminjeongeum Eonhae, the particle ᄂᆞᆫ is used after each consonant. That particle is only used if the previous syllable is pronounced with a final vowel sound; otherwise it'd be ᄋᆞᆫ. Also, that particle is only used after positive vowels (ㅏ, ㆍ, ㅗ) or the neutral vowel ㅣ. ㆍ was most commonly used among the positive vowels to illustrate sounds, making ㆍ or ㅣ seem the most likely candidates. Scholars then rely on various context clues to support the use of the latter over the former, including reasoning on the 1527 text Hunmong chahoe. That text was designed to reflect common practices around Hangul and calls for ㅣ names for syllables not used as finals.

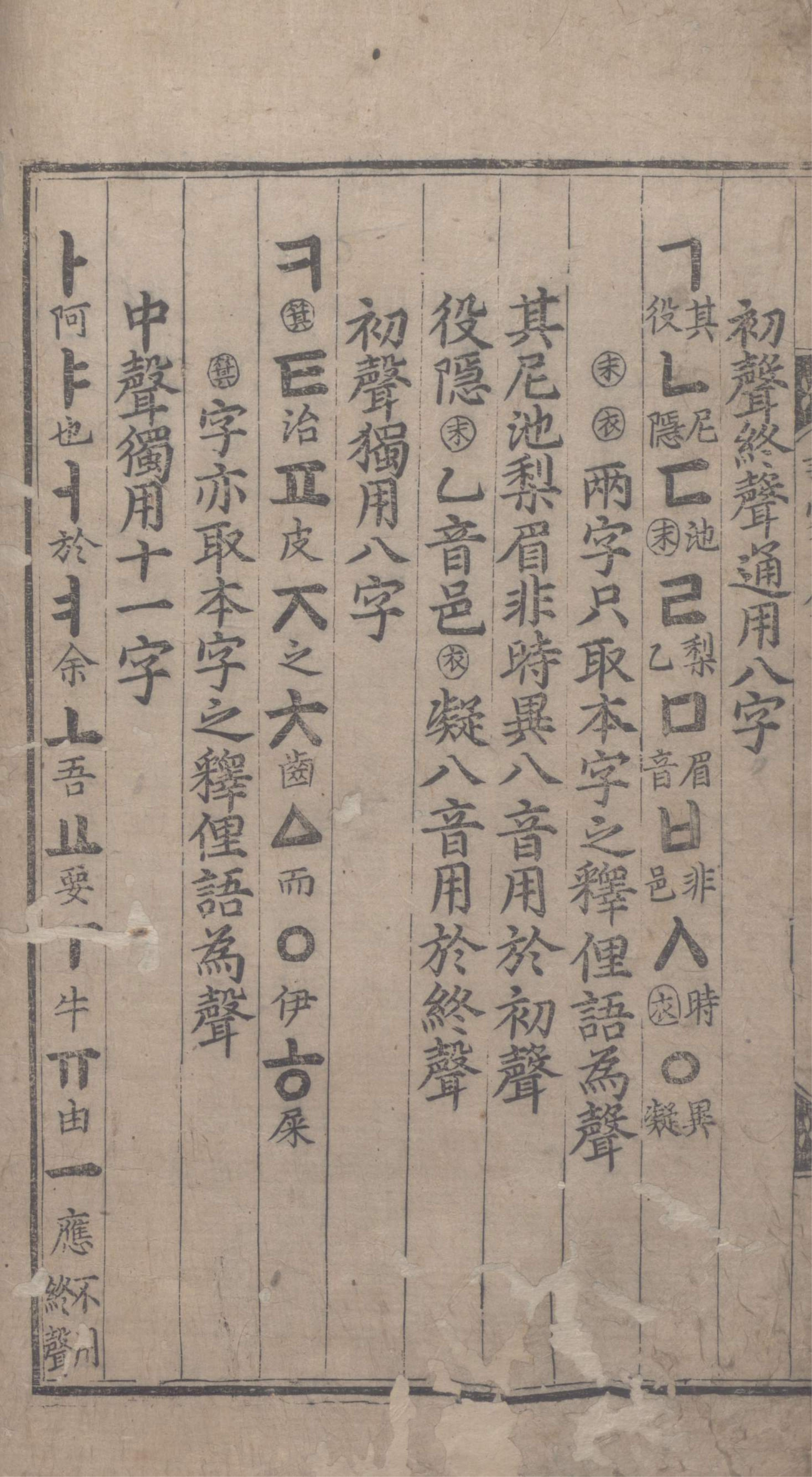
Page on Hunmong chahoe introducing letter names

Names for the base consonants were first attested to in the Hunmong chahoe, although it is unclear if Ch'oe coined the names himself. (Note: Many possibly incorrectly believe that Ch'oe coined the names. However, that is not clear from the text. Ch'oe states elsewhere in the work that his intent was to document current practice at the time. His work is the earliest known attestation to these names.) These names have formed the basis of the modern letter names. Many consonant names tend to follow a pattern where the first syllable has the consonant and ㅣ and the second 으 with the consonant on bottom, for example ㅁ is named mieum (미음). This was done to illustrate the sound of the consonant in both the initial and final position. However, because the names were recorded in an approximate phonetic fashion using Hanja, some of the names broke that pattern when converted back to Korean. For example ㄱ should be gieuk (기윽) by that pattern, but the Hanja given for it (其役) yields giyeok (기역) when converted back. Consonants that were then only used as initials and not finals had names following a different pattern: they were a single syllable containing the consonant and ㅣ. For example, the name of ㅋ was ki (키). The 1569 Buddhist text Chinŏnjip (진언집; 眞言集) used the same names.

In the 1909 report Kungmun yŏn'gu ŭijŏngan (국문연구의정안; 國文硏究議定安) by the government-sponsored Hangul research organization National Language Research Institute, the names of all basic consonants were given in the ㅣ으 pattern, including the formerly irregular names (e.g. giyeok → gieuk) and the names of non-final consonants (e.g. ki → kieuk).

The 1933 Unified Hangul Orthography (UHO) preserved several historical spellings of names, like giyeok, but adopted the ㅣ으 pattern for the non-final consonants that had ㅣ names in the Hunmong chahoe. It was decided to do this as those letters had become used as finals by this point. South Korea still maintains the names chosen by the UHO. It was felt that some of these names had a long tradition, and keeping them would be minimally disruptive. North Korea adopted the apparent intended names of the consonants that broke the ㅣ으 pattern and uses toen (된; lit. 'hard', referring to the harder pronunciation) instead of ssang (쌍; 雙; lit. 'double', referring to letter shapes) for the duplicated consonants (e.g. 된기윽; toen'giŭk). The main reason for this was that ssang is a Sino-Korean word, which North Korea sometimes discourages in favor of native Korean vocabulary.

==== Gyeoremal-keunsajeon consonant names ====
The Gyeoremal-keunsajeon is a joint North–South Korea dictionary project compiled by a joint commission from both sides. Its compilation began in 2004. The joint commission agreed to adopt the regularized spellings of the base consonant names used by North Korea (i.e. 기윽, 디읃, 시읏), but adopt the South Korean practice of using ssang on the doubled consonants. South Korean linguist Hong Yun-pyo argues that this practice is likely to stay limited to use in this dictionary.

=== Archaic letter names ===
Many archaic letters did not have official names; even into the modern period, scholars described them using a variety of names. In 1992, the National Institute of Korean Language (NIKL) met and decided which official names to give the archaic letters; these names were to be applied to Unicode. These names were then romanized using the ISO/TR 11941 romanization system (but without apostrophes).

NIKL names for archaic jamo
Jamo	Name	RR	Unicode
ㅱ	가벼운 미음	gabyeoun mieum	kapyeoun mieum
ㅸ	가벼운 비읍	gabyeoun bieup	kapyeoun pieup
ㅿ	반시옷	bansiot	pansios
ㆆ	여린 히읗	yeorin hieut	yeorin hieuh
ㆁ	옛이응	yennieung	yesieung
ㆄ	가벼운 피읖	gabyeoun pieup	kapyeoun phieuph
ㅹ	가벼운 쌍비읍	gabyeoun ssangbieup	kapyeoun ssangpieup
ᅇ	쌍이응	ssangieung	ssangieung
ㆅ	쌍히읗	ssanghieut	ssanghieuh
ㆍ	아래아	araea	araea
ᆢ	쌍아래아	ssangaraea	ssangaraea
ᄼ	치두음 시옷	chidueum siot	chitueum sios
ᄽ	치두음 쌍시옷	chidueum ssangsiot	chitueum ssangsios
ᄾ	정치음 시옷	jeongchieum siot	ceongchieum sios
ᄿ	정치음 쌍시옷	jeongchieum ssangsiot	ceongchieum ssangsios
ᅎ	치두음 지읒	chidueum jieut	chitueum cieuc
ᅏ	치두음 쌍지읒	chideum ssangjieut	chitueum ssangcieuc
ᅐ	정치음 지읒	jeongchieum jieut	ceongchieum cieuc
ᅑ	정치음 쌍지읒	jeongchieum ssangjieut	ceongchieum ssangcieuc
ᅔ	치두음 치읓	chidueum chieut	chitueum chieuch
ᅕ	정치음 치읓	jeongchieum chieut	ceongchieum chieuch
