= Siot =

Consonant letter of the Korean Hangul alphabet

- Hangul: 시옷
- RR: siot
- MR: siot

North Korean name
- Hangul: 시읏
- RR: sieut
- MR: siŭt

Siot (letter: ㅅ; South Korean name: 시옷; North Korean name: 시읏) is a consonant of the Korean alphabet. Siot indicates an [s] sound like in the English word "staff", but at the end of a syllable it denotes a [t] sound. Before [i], semivowels (like ㅛ, yo) and the vowel ㅟ (wi) it is pronounced [ɕ]. Siot has an unused voiced variant called Bansiot.

== Stroke order ==
Stroke order in writing ㅅ

== Computing codes ==
Character information
Preview	ㅅ		ᄉ		ᆺ	
Unicode name	HANGUL LETTER SIOS		HANGUL CHOSEONG SIOS		HANGUL JONGSEONG SIOS	
Encodings	decimal	hex	dec	hex	dec	hex
Unicode	12613	U+3145	4361	U+1109	4538	U+11BA
UTF-8	227 133 133	E3 85 85	225 132 137	E1 84 89	225 134 186	E1 86 BA
Numeric character reference	&#12613;	&#x3145;	&#4361;	&#x1109;	&#4538;	&#x11BA;
