= Radical 91 =

Chinese character radical

片
- Radical 91 (U+2F5A)
- 片 (U+7247) "slice"

Pronunciations
- Pinyin: piàn
- Bopomofo: ㄆㄧㄢˋ
- Wade–Giles: p'ien4
- Cantonese Yale: pin
- Jyutping: pin3
- Pe̍h-ōe-jī: phiàn
- Japanese Kana: ヘン hen (on'yomi) かた kata (kun'yomi)
- Sino-Korean: 편 pyeon

Names
- Chinese name(s): 片字旁 piànzìpáng
- Japanese name(s): 片/かた kata 片偏/かたへん katahen
- Hangul: 조각 jogak

Stroke order animation

Radical 91 or radical slice (片部) which means "slice" or "film" is one of the 34 Kangxi radicals (214 radicals total) composed of 4 strokes. In the Kangxi Dictionary, there are 77 characters (out of 49,030) to be found under this radical. 片 is also the 84th indexing component in the Table of Indexing Chinese Character Components predominantly adopted by Simplified Chinese dictionaries published in mainland China.

== Evolution ==
Mirror of 爿.

Large seal script character

Small seal script character

== Derived characters ==
Strokes	Characters
+0	片
+4	版
+5	牉 牊
+8	牋 牌 牍^{SC} (=牘)
+9	牎 牏 牐 牑 牒
+10	牓 牔
+11	牕 牖 牗
+15	牘

== Variant forms ==
This radical character takes different forms in Taiwan and in other regions. In Taiwan's Standard Form of National Characters, the second (vertical) stroke and the third (horizontal) stroke share the same ending point, while in other standards, the second stroke ends at the middle of the third stroke.

Chinese (Mainland China)	Chinese (Taiwan)	Japanese
片	片	片
版	版	版

== Hanzi ==
The character is a Hanzi and a fifth grade Kyōiku kanji.

== Literature ==
- Fazzioli, Edoardo (1987). Chinese calligraphy : from pictograph to ideogram : the history of 214 essential Chinese/Japanese characters. calligraphy by Rebecca Hon Ko. New York: Abbeville Press. ISBN 0-89659-774-1.
- Lunde, Ken (Jan 5, 2009). "Appendix J: Japanese Character Sets" (PDF). CJKV Information Processing: Chinese, Japanese, Korean & Vietnamese Computing (Second ed.). Sebastopol, Calif.: O'Reilly Media. ISBN 978-0-596-51447-1.
