= Radical 90 =

Chinese character radical

爿
- Radical 90 (U+2F59)
- 爿 (U+723F) "half of tree trunk"

Pronunciations
- Pinyin: qiáng
- Bopomofo: ㄑㄧㄤˊ
- Wade–Giles: ch'iang2
- Cantonese Yale: chèuhng
- Jyutping: coeng4
- Pe̍h-ōe-jī: chiông
- Japanese Kana: ショウ shō (on'yomi) だい dai (kun'yomi)
- Sino-Korean: 장 jang

Names
- Japanese name(s): 爿偏/しょうへん shōhen
- Hangul: 조각널 jogak neol

Stroke order animation

Radical 90 or radical half tree trunk (爿部) which means "half of a tree trunk" or "split wood" is 1 of 34 Kangxi radicals (214 radicals total) composed of 4 strokes. In the Kangxi Dictionary, there are 48 characters (out of 49,030) to be found under this radical. In the Table of Indexing Chinese Character Components predominantly adopted by Simplified Chinese dictionaries published in mainland China, 爿 is listed as the associated indexing component under the 45th principal indexing component 丬. However, the character 爿 itself and 爿 as in some other characters (e.g. 戕, 寐, etc.) are not simplified. Similar inconsistency can also be found in Japanese shinjitai.

== Evolution ==
A bed, component of 疒; Mirror of 片.

Shang dynasty Oracle bone script

Shang dynasty Oracle bone script variant

Shang dynasty Bronze script

Warring States period bronze script

Chu slip and silk script

Qin slip script

Small seal script character

== Derived characters ==
Strokes	Characters
+0	爿 丬^{Component only}
+4	牀
+5	牁
+6	牂
+9	牃
+10	牄
+11	牅
+13	牆

== Literature ==
- Fazzioli, Edoardo (1987). Chinese calligraphy : from pictograph to ideogram : the history of 214 essential Chinese/Japanese characters. calligraphy by Rebecca Hon Ko. New York: Abbeville Press. ISBN 0-89659-774-1.
- Lunde, Ken (Jan 5, 2009). "Appendix J: Japanese Character Sets" (PDF). CJKV Information Processing: Chinese, Japanese, Korean & Vietnamese Computing (Second ed.). Sebastopol, Calif.: O'Reilly Media. ISBN 978-0-596-51447-1.
