= Yeorinhieut =

Archaic letter of the Korean alphabet Hangul

- ㆆ

Usage
- Writing system: Hangul
- Type: Alphabet
- Sound values: [ʔ]
- In Unicode: U+3186, U+1159, U+11F9

Other

Korean name
- Hangul: 여린히읗
- RR: yeorinhieut
- MR: yŏrinhiŭt

Historical name
- Hangul: 된이응
- RR: doenieung
- MR: toeniŭng

Yeorinhieut (letter: ㆆ; name: 여린히읗; lit. 'soft hieut') is an archaic consonant letter of the Korean alphabet, Hangul. In Unicode, its name is spelled yeorinhieuh, following the ISO/TR 11941 romanization system. It was historically widely called doenieung (된이응; lit. 'hard ieung'), but the South Korean National Institute of Korean Language decided in 1991 to officially name it yeorinhieut because it was felt that contemporary South Koreans would more visually associate the graph with hieut (ㅎ) over ieung (ㅇ). It was associated with a glottal stop [ʔ].

It has a stroke added from ㅇ; the Hunminjeongeum Haerye, the text that introduced Hangul, introduces the two characters as having similar sounds, and when transcribing Korean it says they can be used interchangeably. Various scholars argue that ㆆ was relatively artificial and mostly used as an initial consonants for Sino-Korean words in Chinese dictionaries that begin with a glottal stop and was otherwise not used much. For Korean, it could be used to indicate preglottalization before a tensed consonant. It largely fell out of use for that role by the end of the 15th century, after which it was replaced by ㅅ.

== Computing codes ==
Character information
Preview	ㆆ		ᅙ		ᇹ	
Unicode name	HANGUL LETTER YEORINHIEUH		HANGUL CHOSEONG YEORINHIEUH		HANGUL JONGSEONG YEORINHIEUH	
Encodings	decimal	hex	dec	hex	dec	hex
Unicode	12678	U+3186	4441	U+1159	4601	U+11F9
UTF-8	227 134 134	E3 86 86	225 133 153	E1 85 99	225 135 185	E1 87 B9
Numeric character reference	&#12678;	&#x3186;	&#4441;	&#x1159;	&#4601;	&#x11F9;
