= Ye (hangul) =

Letter of the Korean Hangul alphabet

- Hangul: 예
- RR: ye
- MR: ye

Ye (letter: ㅖ; name: 예) is one of the Korean hangul.

== Stroke order ==
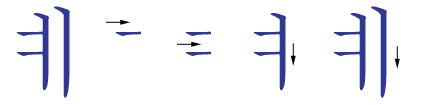
Stroke order in writing ㅖ

== Computing codes ==
Character information
Preview	ㅖ		ᅨ	
Unicode name	HANGUL LETTER YE		HANGUL JUNGSEONG YE	
Encodings	decimal	hex	dec	hex
Unicode	12630	U+3156	4456	U+1168
UTF-8	227 133 150	E3 85 96	225 133 168	E1 85 A8
Numeric character reference	&#12630;	&#x3156;	&#4456;	&#x1168;
