= ISO/TR 11941 =

ISO romanization system for Korean

ISO/TR 11941:1996 (Information and documentation — Transliteration of Korean script into Latin characters) is a Korean romanization system used in International Organization for Standardization (ISO). It is mainly used in character names in Unicode and ISO/IEC 10646.

The technical report was withdrawn in December 2013.

== Transliteration rules ==
=== Consonants ===
Hangul	Latin	
Hangul	Method I (North Korea)	Method II (South Korea)
ㄱ	k	g
ㅋ	kh	k
ㄲ	kk	gg
ㄷ	t	d
ㅌ	th	t
ㄸ	tt	dd
ㅂ	p	b
ㅍ	ph	p
ㅃ	pp	bb
ㅈ	c	j
ㅊ	ch	c
ㅉ	cc	jj
ㅅ	s	
ㅆ	ss	
ㅎ	h	
ㅇ	'/ng (Note: Not transliterated word-initially, ' (apostrophe) as a syllabic initial (always, except word-initially; e.g. 아이 a'i), ng as a syllabic final (e.g. 방 pang/bang).)	
ㄴ	n	
ㄹ	r/l (Note: r as a syllabic initial, l as a syllabic final (e.g. 를 reul).)	
ㅁ	m	

=== Vowels ===
Hangul	Latin
ㅏ	a
ㅓ	eo
ㅗ	o
ㅜ	u
ㅡ	eu
ㅣ	i
ㅐ	ae
ㅔ	e
ㅚ	oe
ㅑ	ya
ㅕ	yeo
ㅛ	yo
ㅠ	yu
ㅒ	yae
ㅖ	ye
ㅘ	wa
ㅝ	weo
ㅟ	wi
ㅙ	wae
ㅞ	we
ㅢ	yi

=== Apostrophe ===
The apostrophe (') is used for resolving ambiguity. It is used in the following cases.

- Both Method I and Method II:
  - When ㅇ appears at the initial position of a non-initial syllable of a polysyllabic word (e.g. 앉아라 anc'ara/anj'ara)
  - When ㄲ, ㄸ, ㅃ, ㅉ, or ㅆ appears at the initial position of a non-initial syllable of a polysyllabic word (e.g. 아까 a'kka/a'gga)
- Method I only:
  - When ㅋ, ㅌ, ㅍ, or ㅊ appears at the initial position of a non-initial syllable of a polysyllabic word (e.g. 애타다 ae'thata)

In fact, the above rules are always applied; they are applied even when there is no ambiguity (e.g. 아이 a'i, 흰떡 hyin'tteok/hyin'ddeog).

== In character names in Unicode and ISO/IEC 10646 ==
In Unicode and ISO/IEC 10646, both Method I and Method II are used for character names.

- Method I: characters in the Hangul Jamo and Hangul Compatibility Jamo blocks (e.g. U+1103 ᄃ HANGUL CHOSEONG TIKEUT (디귿), U+3148 ㅈ HANGUL LETTER CIEUC (지읒))
- Method II: characters in the Hangul Syllables block (e.g. U+AF43 꽃 HANGUL SYLLABLE GGOC)

As the apostrophe is not allowed in character names, it is always omitted. For example, 옛이응 is yes'i'eung in ISO/TR 11941, but YESIEUNG in Unicode and ISO/IEC 10646 (e.g. U+114C ᅌ HANGUL CHOSEONG YESIEUNG).
