= Yae (hangul) =

Korean letter

- Hangul: 얘
- RR: yae
- MR: yae

Yae (letter: ㅒ; name: 얘) is one of the Korean hangul. This vowel is ㅑ + ㅣ combined. When pronounced, ㅒ sounds like the ‘ye‘ in yes and yesterday.

== Stroke order ==
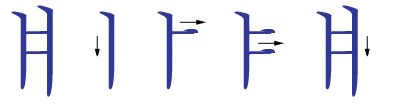
Stroke order in writing ㅒ

== Computing codes ==
Character information
Preview	ㅒ		ᅤ	
Unicode name	HANGUL LETTER YAE		HANGUL JUNGSEONG YAE	
Encodings	decimal	hex	dec	hex
Unicode	12626	U+3152	4452	U+1164
UTF-8	227 133 146	E3 85 92	225 133 164	E1 85 A4
Numeric character reference	&#12626;	&#x3152;	&#4452;	&#x1164;
