= Araea (letter) =

Archaic letter of the Korean alphabet Hangul

- ㆍ

Usage
- Writing system: Hangul
- Type: Alphabet
- Sound values: [ʌ]; [ɐ]; [ɔ]
- In Unicode: U+318D, U+119E

Other

Korean name
- Hangul: 아래아
- RR: araea
- MR: araea

Araea (letter: ㆍ; name: 아래아) is an archaic vowel letter of the Korean alphabet, Hangul. It was associated with either an open-mid back unrounded vowel ([ʌ]), an open back rounded vowel ([ɒ]), or an open-mid back rounded vowel ([ɔ]). While the letter is no longer used in modern Hangul orthographies for the Korean language, it is used for the Jeju language.

Its name, araea (아래아; lit. 'lower a'), is derived from the fact that it is an a-like sound (like ㅏ) but came later in alphabetical order than ㅏ, and thus placed on the bottom of charts for the learning of Hangul (panjŏl).

The letter disappeared from use in two stages: first with its merger into ㅡ in non-initial syllables around by the 16th century, and second with the merger of ㅡ with ㅏ in initial syllables by the 18th century. Still, it continued to be a part of orthography even into the 20th century, long after its sound had disappeared from the language. The colonial government's 1912 Hangul Orthography for Use in Elementary Schools and 1921 Summary of the Hangul Orthography for Use in Elementary Schools allowed its continued use for Sino-Korean vocabulary. However, the 1930 Hangul Orthography prohibited it. The Korean Language Society's 1933 Unified Hangul Orthography also called for its prohibition; its use largely ended with this orthography. Its role has since been replaced with either ㅡ or ㅏ. Still, even into the 1960s, there were stores in South Korea that advertised cigarettes (now spelled "담배") as "담ᄇᆡ". The letter is still used for the Jeju language, where it is pronounced [ɔ] or [ʌ].

== Computing codes ==
Character information
Preview	ㆍ		ᆞ	
Unicode name	HANGUL LETTER ARAEA		HANGUL JUNGSEONG ARAEA	
Encodings	decimal	hex	dec	hex
Unicode	12685	U+318D	4510	U+119E
UTF-8	227 134 141	E3 86 8D	225 134 158	E1 86 9E
Numeric character reference	&#12685;	&#x318D;	&#4510;	&#x119E;
