= Wo (hangul) =

- Hangul: 워
- RR: wo
- MR: wŏ

Wo (letter: ㅝ; name: 워) is one of the Korean hangul.

== Computing codes ==
Character information
Preview	ㅝ		ᅯ	
Unicode name	HANGUL LETTER WEO		HANGUL JUNGSEONG WEO	
Encodings	decimal	hex	dec	hex
Unicode	12637	U+315D	4463	U+116F
UTF-8	227 133 157	E3 85 9D	225 133 175	E1 85 AF
Numeric character reference	&#12637;	&#x315D;	&#4463;	&#x116F;
