= Wae (hangul) =

- Hangul: 왜
- RR: wae
- MR: wae

Wae (letter: ㅙ; name: 왜) is one of the Korean hangul. This compound vowel is ㅗ + ㅐ. To pronounce this vowel, shape your mouth to make the ㅗ sound. Then start to say the ㅗ sound and while quickly saying the ㅐ sound. The resulting sound is ㅙ (wae) as in ‘wedding’.

== Computing codes ==
Character information
| Preview | ㅙ | | ᅫ | |
|---|---|---|---|---|
| Unicode name | HANGUL LETTER WAE | | HANGUL JUNGSEONG WAE | |
| Encodings | decimal | hex | dec | hex |
| Unicode | 12633 | U+3159 | 4459 | U+116B |
| UTF-8 | 227 133 153 | E3 85 99 | 225 133 171 | E1 85 AB |
| Numeric character reference | &#12633; | &#x3159; | &#4459; | &#x116B; |
