= Oe (hangul) =

- Hangul: 외
- RR: oe
- MR: oe

Oe (letter: ㅚ; name: 외) is one of the Korean hangul.

== Computing codes ==
Character information
Preview	ㅚ		ᅬ	
Unicode name	HANGUL LETTER OE		HANGUL JUNGSEONG OE	
Encodings	decimal	hex	dec	hex
Unicode	12634	U+315A	4460	U+116C
UTF-8	227 133 154	E3 85 9A	225 133 172	E1 85 AC
Numeric character reference	&#12634;	&#x315A;	&#4460;	&#x116C;
