= We (hangul) =

Letter of the Korean Hangul alphabet

- Hangul: 웨
- RR: we
- MR: we

We (letter: ㅞ; name: 웨) is one of the Korean hangul.

== Computing codes ==
Character information
Preview	ㅞ		ᅰ	
Unicode name	HANGUL LETTER WE		HANGUL JUNGSEONG WE	
Encodings	decimal	hex	dec	hex
Unicode	12638	U+315E	4464	U+1170
UTF-8	227 133 158	E3 85 9E	225 133 176	E1 85 B0
Numeric character reference	&#12638;	&#x315E;	&#4464;	&#x1170;
