= Yennieung =

Archaic letter of the Korean alphabet Hangul

- ㆁ

Usage
- Writing system: Hangul
- Type: Alphabet
- Sound values: [ŋ]
- In Unicode: U+3181, U+114C, U+11F0

Other

Korean name
- Hangul: 옛이응
- RR: yennieung
- MR: yenniŭng

Yennieung (letter: ㆁ; name: 옛이응) is an archaic consonant letter of the Korean alphabet, Hangul. It was associated with a voiced velar nasal [ŋ] sound. In Unicode, its name is spelled yesieung, following the ISO/TR 11941 romanization system. The letter is no longer used in modern Hangul orthographies. Its function gradually merged with that of the letter ㅇ; that letter now fulfills both their previous roles.

== Description ==
It has a stroke on top, added from ㅇ, the null or zero initial. The relationship between these two characters is considered to be unusual, as they are of different sound classes of the Chinese linguistic system fanqie. Normally, strokes between Hangul letters to relate characters within the same sound class. They were considered to be related because an initial ng sound was a then-disappearing feature of the Chinese language. Ledyard argues that ㆁ is unlikely to have ever been useful as an initial consonant for Korean, as that language likely never had an initial ng sound, and that it was mostly meant for representing Chinese. They were often confused, as they are so visually similar. In the 15th century, it was used in both as an initial and final consonant. It became final only at the start of the 16th century. By the 17th century, the two letters functionally merged into ㅇ.

== Computing codes ==
Character information
Preview	ㆁ		ᅌ		ᇰ	
Unicode name	HANGUL LETTER YESIEUNG		HANGUL CHOSEONG YESIEUNG		HANGUL JONGSEONG YESIEUNG	
Encodings	decimal	hex	dec	hex	dec	hex
Unicode	12673	U+3181	4428	U+114C	4592	U+11F0
UTF-8	227 134 129	E3 86 81	225 133 140	E1 85 8C	225 135 176	E1 87 B0
Numeric character reference	&#12673;	&#x3181;	&#4428;	&#x114C;	&#4592;	&#x11F0;
