= Ieung =

Letter of the Korean alphabet Hangul

- ㅇ

Usage
- Writing system: Hangul
- Type: Alphabet
- Sound values: [∅] (in the initial position); [ʔ] (sometimes); [ŋ] (in the final position)
- In Unicode: U+3147, U+110B, U+11BC

Other

Korean name
- Hangul: 이응
- RR: ieung
- MR: iŭng

Ieung (letter: ㅇ; name: 이응), sometimes also called noieung to clearly distinguish from yennieung, is a consonant letter of the Korean alphabet, Hangul. It is silent when used at the beginning of a syllable (it is a consonant placeholder in vowel letters). However, ㅇ might take on the glottal stop [ʔ] sound on some occasions. It takes on the [ŋ] sound when it is the ending consonant in a syllable.

== History ==
Ieung, along with the rest of Hangul, was officially introduced in the 1446 Hunminjeongeum and Hunminjeongeum Haerye. Its design, originally a perfect circle, directly corresponds to the shape of the human throat during the production of its sound. In the fanqie Chinese phonological system, its sound was classified as laryngeal (喉音) and neither clear nor muddy (不清不濁). It was implied that the letter was largely to be used as a null (∅) placeholder (likely for aesthetic considerations, to make syllable shapes consistent), particularly in the initial position of a syllable, when the vowel sound was supposed to come first. However, the letter possibly sometimes had sound values, namely the voiced velar fricative ɣ or the voiced glottal fricative ɦ, although this is still debated and uncertain. In the 15th century, the letter was sometimes used in the final position as a null value exclusively for Sino-Korean terms. This was done for aesthetic reasons, to make Hangul syllables consistently have some kind of graphical final. This type of use faded by the early 16th century.

The current ieung is a combination of two letters that gradually merged over time: ieung and what is now called yennieung (ㆁ). Yennieung could be used in either the initial or final position as an [ŋ] sound, although it eventually became mostly used in the final position by the 16th century. The two letters are graphically related via the Haerye's stroke addition rule; if you add a stroke to ieung it becomes yennieung. This was considered somewhat unusual, as the stroke addition rule typically relates sounds within the same sound class, but yennieung is of a different class (molar; 牙音). The justification provided for this exception was that an initial ng sound was a then-disappearing feature of the Chinese language. Thus, there was perceived to be a relationship between the disappearing initial ng sound ㆁ and the null initial ㅇ.

The merger between ieung and yennieung happened around the 17th century. Ieung absorbed both of their primary roles (the null initial and the final [ŋ]).

== Name ==
Hangul letter names were not originally provided in the Hunminjeongeum; modern scholars have inferred that this letter's name was possibly originally i (이; 伊). The earliest known record of a name for the letter is i, in the 1527 text Hunmong chahoe. In that text, consonants that were only used in the initial position were single-syllable names with the consonant being named and the vowel ㅣ. Consonants used in the initial and final position were two-syllable names in the form ㅣ으, with the consonant being named in the initial of the first syllable and the final of the final position.

The name ieung (approximately phonetically recorded as 異凝) was originally applied to yennieung in the Hunmong chahoe. After the letters merged, this name eventually became applied to ieung.

== Stroke order ==
Stroke order in writing ㅇ

== Computing codes ==
Character information
Preview	ㅇ		ᄋ		ᆼ	
Unicode name	HANGUL LETTER IEUNG		HANGUL CHOSEONG IEUNG		HANGUL JONGSEONG IEUNG	
Encodings	decimal	hex	dec	hex	dec	hex
Unicode	12615	U+3147	4363	U+110B	4540	U+11BC
UTF-8	227 133 135	E3 85 87	225 132 139	E1 84 8B	225 134 188	E1 86 BC
Numeric character reference	&#12615;	&#x3147;	&#4363;	&#x110B;	&#4540;	&#x11BC;
