= Chieut =

Consonant letter of the Korean Hangul alphabet

- Hangul: 치읓
- RR: chieut
- MR: ch'iŭt

Chieut (letter: ㅊ; name: 치읓) is a consonant of the Korean hangul alphabet. Its IPA pronunciation is [tʃʰ] but at the end of a syllable it is pronounced [t] unless followed by a vowel. For example: 김치 kimchi, but 꽃 kkot ("flower").

== Stroke order ==
Stroke order in writing ㅊ

== Computing codes ==
Character information
| Preview | ㅊ | | ᄎ | | ᆾ | |
|---|---|---|---|---|---|---|
| Unicode name | HANGUL LETTER CHIEUCH | | HANGUL CHOSEONG CHIEUCH | | HANGUL JONGSEONG CHIEUCH | |
| Encodings | decimal | hex | dec | hex | dec | hex |
| Unicode | 12618 | U+314A | 4366 | U+110E | 4542 | U+11BE |
| UTF-8 | 227 133 138 | E3 85 8A | 225 132 142 | E1 84 8E | 225 134 190 | E1 86 BE |
| Numeric character reference | &#12618; | &#x314A; | &#4366; | &#x110E; | &#4542; | &#x11BE; |
