= O (hangul) =

Hangul in the Korean alphabet

- Hangul: 오
- RR: o
- MR: o

O (letter: ㅗ; name: 오) is one of the Korean hangul.

== Stroke order ==
Stroke order in writing ㅗ

== Computing codes ==
Character information
Preview	ㅗ		ᅩ	
Unicode name	HANGUL LETTER O		HANGUL JUNGSEONG O	
Encodings	decimal	hex	dec	hex
Unicode	12631	U+3157	4457	U+1169
UTF-8	227 133 151	E3 85 97	225 133 169	E1 85 A9
Numeric character reference	&#12631;	&#x3157;	&#4457;	&#x1169;
