= Wi (hangul) =

Hangul vowel

- Hangul: 위
- RR: wi
- MR: wi

Wi (letter: ㅟ; name: 위 Korean pronunciation: [y]) is a vowel in Korean hangul.

== Computing codes ==
Character information
Preview	ㅟ		ᅱ	
Unicode name	HANGUL LETTER WI		HANGUL JUNGSEONG WI	
Encodings	decimal	hex	dec	hex
Unicode	12639	U+315F	4465	U+1171
UTF-8	227 133 159	E3 85 9F	225 133 177	E1 85 B1
Numeric character reference	&#12639;	&#x315F;	&#4465;	&#x1171;
