= Digeut =

Consonant letter of the Korean Hangul alphabet

- Hangul: 디귿
- RR: digeut
- MR: tigŭt

North Korean name
- Hangul: 디읃
- RR: dieut
- MR: tiŭt

Digeut (letter: ㄷ; South Korean name: 디귿; North Korean name: 디읃) is a consonant in the Korean alphabet. Depending on its position, it makes a 'd' or a 't' sound. In an initial or final position in a word, the pronunciation is usually [t], while after a vowel it is pronounced [d], for example in the word deudieo (드디어, "finally"), the initial ㄷ is [t], while the second ㄷ is [d].

== Stroke order ==
Stroke order in writing ㄱ

== Computing codes ==
Character information
Preview	ㄷ		ᄃ		ᆮ	
Unicode name	HANGUL LETTER TIKEUT		HANGUL CHOSEONG TIKEUT		HANGUL JONGSEONG TIKEUT	
Encodings	decimal	hex	dec	hex	dec	hex
Unicode	12599	U+3137	4355	U+1103	4526	U+11AE
UTF-8	227 132 183	E3 84 B7	225 132 131	E1 84 83	225 134 174	E1 86 AE
Numeric character reference	&#12599;	&#x3137;	&#4355;	&#x1103;	&#4526;	&#x11AE;
