= Giyeok =

Consonant letter of the Korean Hangul alphabet

- Hangul: 기역
- RR: giyeok
- MR: kiyŏk

North Korean name
- Hangul: 기윽
- RR: gieuk
- MR: kiŭk

Giyeok (letter: ㄱ; South Korean name: 기역; North Korean name: 기윽) is one of the Korean Hangul. Depending on its position, it makes a 'g' or 'k' sound. At the beginning and end of a word it is usually pronounced [k], while after a vowel it is [ɡ]. The IPA pronunciation is [k].

== Stroke order ==
Stroke order in writing ㄱ

== Computing codes ==
Character information
Preview	ㄱ		ᄀ		ᆨ	
Unicode name	HANGUL LETTER KIYEOK		HANGUL CHOSEONG KIYEOK		HANGUL JONGSEONG KIYEOK	
Encodings	decimal	hex	dec	hex	dec	hex
Unicode	12593	U+3131	4352	U+1100	4520	U+11A8
UTF-8	227 132 177	E3 84 B1	225 132 128	E1 84 80	225 134 168	E1 86 A8
Numeric character reference	&#12593;	&#x3131;	&#4352;	&#x1100;	&#4520;	&#x11A8;
