= Jieut =

Consonant letter of the Korean Hangul alphabet

- Hangul: 지읒
- RR: jieut
- MR: chiŭt

Jieut (letter: ㅈ; name: 지읒) is a consonant of the Korean alphabet. The IPA pronunciation is voiceless [t͡ɕ] at the beginning of a word and voiced [d͡ʑ] after vowels. It becomes [t] at the end of a syllable, unless a vowel follows it.

== Stroke order ==
Stroke order in writing ㅈ

But some people write like ス in Japanese.

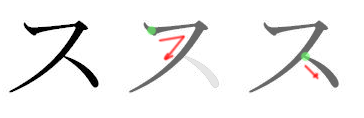

== Computing codes ==
Character information
Preview	ㅈ		ᄌ		ᆽ	
Unicode name	HANGUL LETTER CIEUC		HANGUL CHOSEONG CIEUC		HANGUL JONGSEONG CIEUC	
Encodings	decimal	hex	dec	hex	dec	hex
Unicode	12616	U+3148	4364	U+110C	4541	U+11BD
UTF-8	227 133 136	E3 85 88	225 132 140	E1 84 8C	225 134 189	E1 86 BD
Numeric character reference	&#12616;	&#x3148;	&#4364;	&#x110C;	&#4541;	&#x11BD;
