= Ae (hangul) =

- Hangul: 애
- RR: ae
- MR: ae

Ae (letter: ㅐ; name: 애; Korean pronunciation: [ɛ]) is a vowel in Korean hangul.

== History ==
The letter was originally the combination of ⟨ㅏ⟩ and ⟨ㅣ⟩ as verified from the description of the chapter "An Explanation of the Medials (中聲解)" of the Hunminjeongeum Haerye. (Note: Ten combinations with the letter ⟨ㅣ⟩ as a medial letter exist (一字中聲之與ㅣ相合者十), which are ㆎ ㅢ ㅚ ㅐ ㅟ ㅔ ㆉ ㅒ ㆌ ㅖ.) In the 15th century, the letter was originally pronounced as the diphthong /aj/, however, it was not included with the 11 medial letters, along with ㅕ, ㅛ, ㅠ, which started with the letter ⟨ㅣ⟩. From the 18th and 19th century, the change of pronunciations of the word is attested by confused notations with ㅔ.

== Stroke order ==
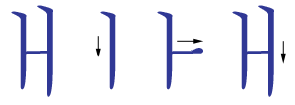
Stroke order in writing ㅐ

== Computing codes ==
Character information
Preview	ㅐ		ᅢ	
Unicode name	HANGUL LETTER AE		HANGUL JUNGSEONG AE	
Encodings	decimal	hex	dec	hex
Unicode	12624	U+3150	4450	U+1162
UTF-8	227 133 144	E3 85 90	225 133 162	E1 85 A2
Numeric character reference	&#12624;	&#x3150;	&#4450;	&#x1162;
