= Bieup =

Consonant letter of the Korean alphabet

- Hangul: 비읍
- RR: bieup
- MR: piŭp

Bieup (letter: ㅂ; name: 비읍) is a consonant of the Korean alphabet. It indicates a 'b' or 'p' sound, depending on its position. At the beginning and end of a word or syllable it indicates a [p] sound, while after a vowel it designates a [b] sound. For example: it is pronounced [b̥] in 바지 baji ("trousers"), but [b] in 아버지 abeoji ("father").

== Stroke order ==
Stroke order in writing ㅂ

== Computing codes ==
Character information
Preview	ㅂ		ᄇ		ᆸ	
Unicode name	HANGUL LETTER PIEUP		HANGUL CHOSEONG PIEUP		HANGUL JONGSEONG PIEUP	
Encodings	decimal	hex	dec	hex	dec	hex
Unicode	12610	U+3142	4359	U+1107	4536	U+11B8
UTF-8	227 133 130	E3 85 82	225 132 135	E1 84 87	225 134 184	E1 86 B8
Numeric character reference	&#12610;	&#x3142;	&#4359;	&#x1107;	&#4536;	&#x11B8;
