= Rieul (hangul) =

Consonant letter of the Korean Hangul alphabet

- Hangul: 리을
- RR: rieul
- MR: riŭl

Rieul (letter: ㄹ; name: 리을) is a consonant of the Korean alphabet. Rieul is pronounced [ɾ] at the beginning of a syllable and [l] at the end of a syllable. For example: 러시아 reosia ('Russia'), 별 byeol ('star').

== Stroke order ==
Stroke order in writing ㄹ

== Computing codes ==
Character information
Preview	ㄹ		ᄅ		ᆯ	
Unicode name	HANGUL LETTER RIEUL		HANGUL CHOSEONG RIEUL		HANGUL JONGSEONG RIEUL	
Encodings	decimal	hex	dec	hex	dec	hex
Unicode	12601	U+3139	4357	U+1105	4527	U+11AF
UTF-8	227 132 185	E3 84 B9	225 132 133	E1 84 85	225 134 175	E1 86 AF
Numeric character reference	&#12601;	&#x3139;	&#4357;	&#x1105;	&#4527;	&#x11AF;
