= U (hangul) =

Letter of the Korean Hangul alphabet

- Hangul: 우
- RR: u
- MR: u

U (letter: ㅜ; name: 우) is a letter of the Korean alphabet Hangul.

== Stroke order ==
Stroke order in writing ㅜ

== Computing codes ==
Character information
Preview	ㅜ		ᅮ	
Unicode name	HANGUL LETTER U		HANGUL JUNGSEONG U	
Encodings	decimal	hex	dec	hex
Unicode	12636	U+315C	4462	U+116E
UTF-8	227 133 156	E3 85 9C	225 133 174	E1 85 AE
Numeric character reference	&#12636;	&#x315C;	&#4462;	&#x116E;
