= Pieup =

Consonant letter of the Korean Hangul alphabet

- Hangul: 피읖
- RR: pieup
- MR: p'iŭp

Pieup (letter: ㅍ; name: 피읖) is a consonant of the Korean hangul alphabet. It is pronounced aspirated, as [pʰ] at the beginning of a syllable and as [p] at the end of a syllable. For example: aspirated in 프랑스 peurangseu ("France"), but unaspirated in 앞 ap ("front"). In loanwords, this jamo is used when transliterating "f" in 필름 pilleum ("film").

== Stroke order ==
Stroke order in writing ㅍ

== Computing codes ==
Character information
Preview	ㅍ		ᄑ		ᇁ	
Unicode name	HANGUL LETTER PHIEUPH		HANGUL CHOSEONG PHIEUPH		HANGUL JONGSEONG PHIEUPH	
Encodings	decimal	hex	dec	hex	dec	hex
Unicode	12621	U+314D	4369	U+1111	4545	U+11C1
UTF-8	227 133 141	E3 85 8D	225 132 145	E1 84 91	225 135 129	E1 87 81
Numeric character reference	&#12621;	&#x314D;	&#4369;	&#x1111;	&#4545;	&#x11C1;
