= I (hangul) =

Vowel in the Korean hangul

- Hangul: 이
- RR: i
- MR: i

I (letter: ㅣ; name: 이) is a vowel in the Korean hangul with the IPA /i/.

== Stroke order ==
Stroke order in writing ㅣ

== Computing codes ==
Character information
Preview	ㅣ		ᅵ	
Unicode name	HANGUL LETTER I		HANGUL JUNGSEONG I	
Encodings	decimal	hex	dec	hex
Unicode	12643	U+3163	4469	U+1175
UTF-8	227 133 163	E3 85 A3	225 133 181	E1 85 B5
Numeric character reference	&#12643;	&#x3163;	&#4469;	&#x1175;
