= Mieum (hangul) =

Consonant letter of the Korean Hangul alphabet

- Hangul: 미음
- RR: mieum
- MR: miŭm

Mieum (letter: ㅁ; name: 미음) is a consonant of the Korean alphabet. It indicates an 'm' sound. The IPA pronunciation is [m͊/m].

== Stroke order ==
Stroke order in writing ㅁ

== Computing codes ==
Character information
Preview	ㅁ		ᄆ		ᆷ	
Unicode name	HANGUL LETTER MIEUM		HANGUL CHOSEONG MIEUM		HANGUL JONGSEONG MIEUM	
Encodings	decimal	hex	dec	hex	dec	hex
Unicode	12609	U+3141	4358	U+1106	4535	U+11B7
UTF-8	227 133 129	E3 85 81	225 132 134	E1 84 86	225 134 183	E1 86 B7
Numeric character reference	&#12609;	&#x3141;	&#4358;	&#x1106;	&#4535;	&#x11B7;
