= Wa (hangul) =

- Hangul: 와
- RR: wa
- MR: wa

Wa (letter: ㅘ; name: 와) is one of the Korean hangul.

== Computing codes ==
Character information
| Preview | ㅘ | | ᅪ | |
|---|---|---|---|---|
| Unicode name | HANGUL LETTER WA | | HANGUL JUNGSEONG WA | |
| Encodings | decimal | hex | dec | hex |
| Unicode | 12632 | U+3158 | 4458 | U+116A |
| UTF-8 | 227 133 152 | E3 85 98 | 225 133 170 | E1 85 AA |
| Numeric character reference | &#12632; | &#x3158; | &#4458; | &#x116A; |
