= E (hangul) =

Letter of the Korean Hangul alphabet

- Hangul: 에
- RR: e
- MR: e

E (letter: ㅔ; name: 에; IPA: [e]) is one of the Korean hangul.

== Stroke order ==
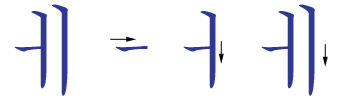
Stroke order in writing ㅔ

== Computing codes ==
Character information
Preview	ㅔ		ᅦ	
Unicode name	HANGUL LETTER E		HANGUL JUNGSEONG E	
Encodings	decimal	hex	dec	hex
Unicode	12628	U+3154	4454	U+1166
UTF-8	227 133 148	E3 85 94	225 133 166	E1 85 A6
Numeric character reference	&#12628;	&#x3154;	&#4454;	&#x1166;
