= Kieuk =

Consonant letter of the Korean alphabet

- Hangul: 키읔
- RR: kieuk
- MR: k'iŭk

Kieuk (letter: ㅋ; name: 키읔) is a consonant of the Korean Hangul alphabet. It is pronounced aspirated, as [kʰ] at the beginning of a syllable and as [k] at the end of a syllable. For example: 코 ko ("nose") is pronounced [k^{h}o], while 부엌 bueok ("kitchen") is pronounced [puʌk].

== Slang usage ==
In South Korean internet slang, the use of ㅋ (short for 크; keu) indicates laughter. Similarly, ㅎ (short for 흐; heu) is a lighter laugh than ㅋ. Either ㅋ or ㅎ can be repeated a number of times to this effect.

== Stroke order ==
Stroke order in writing ㅋ

== Computing codes ==
Character information
Preview	ㅋ		ᄏ		ᆿ	
Unicode name	HANGUL LETTER KHIEUKH		HANGUL CHOSEONG KHIEUKH		HANGUL JONGSEONG KHIEUKH	
Encodings	decimal	hex	dec	hex	dec	hex
Unicode	12619	U+314B	4367	U+110F	4543	U+11BF
UTF-8	227 133 139	E3 85 8B	225 132 143	E1 84 8F	225 134 191	E1 86 BF
Numeric character reference	&#12619;	&#x314B;	&#4367;	&#x110F;	&#4543;	&#x11BF;
