= Tieut =

Letter of the Korean alphabet (Hangul)

- Hangul: 티읕
- RR: tieut
- MR: t'iŭt

Tieut (letter: ㅌ; name: 티읕) is a consonant of the Korean hangul alphabet. It is pronounced aspirated, as [tʰ] at the beginning of a syllable and as [t] at the end of a syllable. For example: 토마토 tomato [tʰomatʰo] but 붙다 butta ("to stick to"), where it is pronounced with an unaspirated [t] sound.

== Stroke order ==
Stroke order in writing ㅌ

== Computing codes ==
Character information
Preview	ㅌ		ᄐ		ᇀ	
Unicode name	HANGUL LETTER THIEUTH		HANGUL CHOSEONG THIEUTH		HANGUL JONGSEONG THIEUTH	
Encodings	decimal	hex	dec	hex	dec	hex
Unicode	12620	U+314C	4368	U+1110	4544	U+11C0
UTF-8	227 133 140	E3 85 8C	225 132 144	E1 84 90	225 135 128	E1 87 80
Numeric character reference	&#12620;	&#x314C;	&#4368;	&#x1110;	&#4544;	&#x11C0;
