= Eo (hangul) =

Vowel in the Korean hangul

- Hangul: 어
- RR: eo
- MR: ŏ

Eo (letter: ㅓ; name: 어; [ʌ]) is a vowel of the Korean hangul. It represents the [ʌ] sound as described by IPA. When lengthened, [ʌː] is actually pronounced closer to [ə].

== Stroke order ==
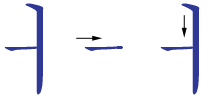
Stroke order in writing ㅓ

== Computing codes ==
Character information
Preview	ㅓ		ᅥ	
Unicode name	HANGUL LETTER EO		HANGUL JUNGSEONG EO	
Encodings	decimal	hex	dec	hex
Unicode	12627	U+3153	4453	U+1165
UTF-8	227 133 147	E3 85 93	225 133 165	E1 85 A5
Numeric character reference	&#12627;	&#x3153;	&#4453;	&#x1165;
