= Ui (hangul) =

- Hangul: 의
- RR: ui
- MR: ŭi

Ui (letter: ㅢ; name: 의) is one of the Korean hangul. It makes the 'ui' (/ɯi/) sound for most Korean words, for the genitive case marker '의', it makes the /e/ sound.

== Computing codes ==
Character information
Preview	ㅢ		ᅴ	
Unicode name	HANGUL LETTER YI		HANGUL JUNGSEONG YI	
Encodings	decimal	hex	dec	hex
Unicode	12642	U+3162	4468	U+1174
UTF-8	227 133 162	E3 85 A2	225 133 180	E1 85 B4
Numeric character reference	&#12642;	&#x3162;	&#4468;	&#x1174;
