= Hieut =

Consonant letter of the Korean alphabet

- Hangul: 히읗
- RR: hieut
- MR: hiŭt

Hieut (letter: ㅎ; name: 히읗) is a consonant letter (jamo) of the Korean Hangeul alphabet. It has two pronunciation forms, [h] at the beginning of a syllable and [t̚] at the end of a syllable. After vowels or the consonant ㄴ it is semi-silent.

It sounds like [h] in an initial or (total or full) onset position (하), intervowel position (partial onset (아하) or coda with a previous vowel in the same syllable block and followed by an onset vowel from another block (아[...]아앟아) or pseudonset (앟아)) and in a coda following a consonant (받침) before an onset vowel in the next syllable (않아). It assimilates via aspiration codas before plosive consonants; if ㅎ is a full coda (the end of the speech temporarily or finally) or batchim, it would sound like [t̚] (앟 at).

== Slang usage ==
In South Korean internet slang, the use of ㅎ (short for 흐; heu) indicates laughter, although a lighter laugh than ㅋ (short for 크; keu). Either ㅎ or ㅋ can be repeated a number of times to this effect.

== Stroke order ==
Stroke order in writing ㅎ

== Computing codes ==
Character information
Preview	ㅎ		ᄒ		ᇂ	
Unicode name	HANGUL LETTER HIEUH		HANGUL CHOSEONG HIEUH		HANGUL JONGSEONG HIEUH	
Encodings	decimal	hex	dec	hex	dec	hex
Unicode	12622	U+314E	4370	U+1112	4546	U+11C2
UTF-8	227 133 142	E3 85 8E	225 132 146	E1 84 92	225 135 130	E1 87 82
Numeric character reference	&#12622;	&#x314E;	&#4370;	&#x1112;	&#4546;	&#x11C2;
