= Yu (hangul) =

Korean letter

- Hangul: 유
- RR: yu
- MR: yu

Yu (letter: ㅠ; name: 유) is one of the Korean hangul.

== Stroke order ==
Stroke order in writing ㅠ

== Computing codes ==
Character information
Preview	ㅠ		ᅲ	
Unicode name	HANGUL LETTER YU		HANGUL JUNGSEONG YU	
Encodings	decimal	hex	dec	hex
Unicode	12640	U+3160	4466	U+1172
UTF-8	227 133 160	E3 85 A0	225 133 178	E1 85 B2
Numeric character reference	&#12640;	&#x3160;	&#4466;	&#x1172;
