= Yeo (hangul) =

- Hangul: 여
- RR: yeo
- MR: yŏ

Yeo (letter: ㅕ; name: 여) is a diphthong of the Korean hangul alphabet, representing the sound [jʌ] as described by the IPA.

== Stroke order ==
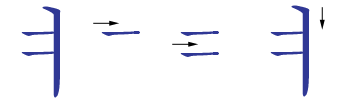
Stroke order in writing ㅕ

== Computing codes ==
Character information
Preview	ㅕ		ᅧ	
Unicode name	HANGUL LETTER YEO		HANGUL JUNGSEONG YEO	
Encodings	decimal	hex	dec	hex
Unicode	12629	U+3155	4455	U+1167
UTF-8	227 133 149	E3 85 95	225 133 167	E1 85 A7
Numeric character reference	&#12629;	&#x3155;	&#4455;	&#x1167;
