= Ya (hangul) =

Vowel letter of the Korean Hangul alphabet

- Hangul: 야
- RR: ya
- MR: ya

Ya (letter: ㅑ; name: 야) is a letter of the Korean hangul alphabet. It is a vowel representing a "ya" sound. The IPA pronunciation is [jɐ].

== Stroke order ==
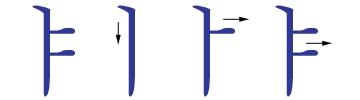
Stroke order in writing ㅑ

== Computing codes ==
Character information
Preview	ㅑ		ᅣ	
Unicode name	HANGUL LETTER YA		HANGUL JUNGSEONG YA	
Encodings	decimal	hex	dec	hex
Unicode	12625	U+3151	4451	U+1163
UTF-8	227 133 145	E3 85 91	225 133 163	E1 85 A3
Numeric character reference	&#12625;	&#x3151;	&#4451;	&#x1163;
