= Yo (hangul) =

Component of the Korean hangul writing system

- Hangul: 요
- RR: yo
- MR: yo

Yo (letter: ㅛ; name: 요) is a jamo, the smallest component of the Korean hangul writing system.

== Stroke order ==
Stroke order in writing ㅛ

== Computing codes ==
Character information
Preview	ㅛ		ᅭ	
Unicode name	HANGUL LETTER YO		HANGUL JUNGSEONG YO	
Encodings	decimal	hex	dec	hex
Unicode	12635	U+315B	4461	U+116D
UTF-8	227 133 155	E3 85 9B	225 133 173	E1 85 AD
Numeric character reference	&#12635;	&#x315B;	&#4461;	&#x116D;
