= Bansiot =

Archaic letter of the Korean alphabet Hangul

- ㅿ

Usage
- Writing system: Hangul
- Type: Alphabet
- Sound values: [z]
- In Unicode: U+317F, U+1140, U+11EB

Other

Korean name
- Hangul: 반시옷
- RR: bansiot
- MR: pansiot

Bansiot (letter: ㅿ; name: 반시옷), sometimes called samgakhyeong (삼각형; lit. 'triangle'), is an archaic consonant letter of the Korean alphabet, Hangul. In Unicode, its name is spelled pansios, following the ISO/TR 11941 romanization system. Bansiot's sound value is disputed, but most scholars believe it to have been the voiced alveolar fricative [z] in Middle Korean. It fell out of use around the late 16th century, as its corresponding phoneme disappeared from the language.

== Description ==
ㅿ was a voiced equivalent of ㅅ. Its use was generally restricted to the word medial position (i.e. not the initial or final consonant of a word), although it was sometimes used as the first initial consonant of a word. It was used in the initial position to represent some Late Middle Chinese sounds, like ᅀᅵᆯ (日; lit. 'day') or ᅀᅵᆫ (人; lit. 'man'); when used for such cases, its Sino-Korean pronunciation was possibly [ʐ]. Early Hangul texts sometimes used it similarly to the saisiot; for example, 太子 ㅿ 位 ([tajdza ㅿ we]; lit. 'the prince's position') appears in Yongbiŏch'ŏn'ga. This type of usage eventually disappeared.

ㅿ fell out of significant use to represent Korean by around the 1570s to 1580s. By this point, its corresponding phoneme had disappeared out of the language. In many cases, its sound simply ceased to be used in words; for example, Middle Korean ᄆᆞᅀᆞᆶ (lit. 'village') has since become 마을 in modern Standard Korean. In a subset of cases, the loss of ㅿ across adjacent vowels resulted in a simpler word with a long vowel. For example, 기ᅀᅳᆷ〮 → 김 (lit. 'gim'). In rare cases, it was replaced with a ㅅ. Its role eventually came to be replaced by ㅇ. It continued to see some limited use for the transcription of foreign languages thereafter.

ㅿ resembles ㅅ but with a horizontal line connecting its stroke's bottom, fairly resembling a triangle, hence the alternative name samgakhyeong.

== Computing codes ==
Character information
Preview	ㅿ		ᅀ		ᇫ	
Unicode name	HANGUL LETTER PANSIOS		HANGUL CHOSEONG PANSIOS		HANGUL JONGSEONG PANSIOS	
Encodings	decimal	hex	dec	hex	dec	hex
Unicode	12671	U+317F	4416	U+1140	4587	U+11EB
UTF-8	227 133 191	E3 85 BF	225 133 128	E1 85 80	225 135 171	E1 87 AB
Numeric character reference	&#12671;	&#x317F;	&#4416;	&#x1140;	&#4587;	&#x11EB;
