= Eu (hangul) =

Letter of the Korean Hangul alphabet

- Hangul: 으
- RR: eu
- MR: ŭ

Eu (letter: ㅡ; name: 으) is one of the Korean hangul vowels, pronounced like the IPA sound [ɯ] (the close back unrounded vowel).

== Stroke order ==
Stroke order in writing ㅡ

== Computing codes ==
Character information
Preview	ㅡ		ᅳ	
Unicode name	HANGUL LETTER EU		HANGUL JUNGSEONG EU	
Encodings	decimal	hex	dec	hex
Unicode	12641	U+3161	4467	U+1173
UTF-8	227 133 161	E3 85 A1	225 133 179	E1 85 B3
Numeric character reference	&#12641;	&#x3161;	&#4467;	&#x1173;
