= A (hangul) =

Vowel letter of the Korean Hangul alphabet

- Hangul: 아
- RR: a
- MR: a

A (letter: ㅏ; name: 아) is a jamo, the smallest component of the Korean hangul writing system. It represents a vowel, the IPA pronunciation of which is [a].

== Stroke order ==
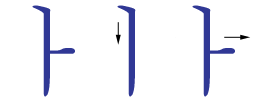
Stroke order in writing ㅏ

== Computing codes ==
Character information
Preview	ㅏ		ᅡ	
Unicode name	HANGUL LETTER A		HANGUL JUNGSEONG A	
Encodings	decimal	hex	dec	hex
Unicode	12623	U+314F	4449	U+1161
UTF-8	227 133 143	E3 85 8F	225 133 161	E1 85 A1
Numeric character reference	&#12623;	&#x314F;	&#4449;	&#x1161;

== See also ==
- Turnstile (symbol)
