= Nieun =

Consonant letter of the Korean Hangul alphabet

- Hangul: 니은
- RR: nieun
- MR: niŭn

Nieun (letter: ㄴ; name: 니은) is the second consonant of the Korean alphabet. It makes an 'n' sound. The IPA pronunciation is [n].

== Stroke order ==
Stroke order in writing ㄴ

== Computing codes ==
Character information
Preview	ㄴ		ᄂ		ᆫ	
Unicode name	HANGUL LETTER NIEUN		HANGUL CHOSEONG NIEUN		HANGUL JONGSEONG NIEUN	
Encodings	decimal	hex	dec	hex	dec	hex
Unicode	12596	U+3134	4354	U+1102	4523	U+11AB
UTF-8	227 132 180	E3 84 B4	225 132 130	E1 84 82	225 134 171	E1 86 AB
Numeric character reference	&#12596;	&#x3134;	&#4354;	&#x1102;	&#4523;	&#x11AB;
