= Revised Romanization of Korean =

Korean language romanization system

- Hangul: 국어의 로마자 표기법
- Hanja: 國語의 로마字 表記法
- Lit.: Roman-letter notation of the national language
- RR: Gugeoui romaja pyogibeop
- MR: Kugŏŭi romacha p'yogipŏp

Revised Romanization of Korean (RR; Korean: 국어의 로마자 표기법) is the official Korean language romanization system in South Korea. It was developed by the National Academy of the Korean Language from 1995 and was released to the public on 7 July 2000 by South Korea's Ministry of Culture, Sports and Tourism in Proclamation No. 2000-8.

The main purpose of RR is to romanize proper nouns such as place names, personal names, and business names.

== Conversion process ==
The following steps are applied in order to construct an RR romanization from a Hangul string:

1. With some exceptions, swap out portions of the Hangul string to reflect standard pronunciation spellings. For example, swap out "독립문" (*Dokripmun) with "동님문" (Dongnimmun); the latter spelling is how the former is pronounced.
  - Exceptions include the given names of people (keep "한복남" (Han Boknam), even though it is pronounced "한봉남" (Han Bongnam)) or between syllables that will receive hyphens in the romanization (keep "인왕리" (Inwang-ri), even though it is pronounced "인왕니" (Inwang-ni)).
2. For each syllable, in order from left to right, break the syllable down into jamo (letters). For each jamo (in order, within the syllable, of left to right, top to bottom), refer to either the consonant or vowel table below, depending on the role the jamo is serving. Some consonants are rendered differently depending on whether they are the initial or final character of a syllable; use the corresponding romanization.
3. Some modifications may need to be made to the romanization. For example, a space should be inserted between family and given names, proper nouns should be capitalized, and hyphens should be inserted before administrative units (some of the administrative units and their hyphens can even be removed altogether, as they are optional). There are a number of scenarios where hyphens can optionally be inserted (see § Hyphenation), but optional hyphens are discouraged.

Consonants
Hangul		ㄱ	ㄲ	ㄴ	ㄷ	ㄸ	ㄹ	ㅁ	ㅂ	ㅃ	ㅅ	ㅆ	ㅇ	ㅈ	ㅉ	ㅊ	ㅋ	ㅌ	ㅍ	ㅎ
Romanization	Initial	g	kk	n	d	tt	r	m	b	pp	s	ss	—	j	jj	ch	k	t	p	h
Romanization	Final	k	k	n	t	—	l	m	p	—	t	t	ng	t	—	t	k	t	p	t

ㄱ, ㄷ, ㅂ and ㄹ are transcribed as g, d, b and r when placed at the beginning of a word or coming before a vowel, and as k, t, p and l when followed by another consonant or when appearing at the end of a word.

Vowels
Hangul	ㅏ	ㅐ	ㅑ	ㅒ	ㅓ	ㅔ	ㅕ	ㅖ	ㅗ	ㅘ	ㅙ	ㅚ	ㅛ	ㅜ	ㅝ	ㅞ	ㅟ	ㅠ	ㅡ	ㅢ	ㅣ
Romanization	a	ae	ya	yae	eo	e	yeo	ye	o	wa	wae	oe	yo	u	wo	we	wi	yu	eu	ui	i

=== Examples ===
- 안녕하세요 → ㅇㅏㄴㄴㅕㅇㅎㅏㅅㅔㅇㅛ → annyeonghaseyo
- 종로구 → 종노구 (swap with pronunciation Hangul) → ㅈㅗㅇㄴㅗㄱㅜ → jongnogu → Jongno-gu (capitalize proper noun, insert hyphen before administrative unit particle)
- 홍빛나 (person's name; do not swap with pronunciation Hangul 홍빈나) → ㅎㅗㅇㅂㅣㅊㄴㅏ → hongbitna → Hong Bitna (insert space between family and given names and capitalize them)
- 입어 → 이버 (swap with pronunciation Hangul; final consonants are resyllabized to initial when followed by an initial ㅇ) → ㅇㅣㅂㅓ → ibeo

=== Hyphenation ===
In RR, hyphens (Note: In RR, the hyphen is called 붙임표 (lit. joining symbol). However, the hyphen in RR is not used for "joining", but rather for "separating".) can be either optional or mandatory.

- Optional hyphens are used in two scenarios:
  1. Disambiguating pronunciation (e.g. 해운대 Hae-undae)
  2. Between syllables of a given name (e.g. 홍길동 Hong Gil-dong)
- Mandatory hyphens are for separating an administrative unit (e.g. 평창군 Pyeongchang-gun)

Hyphens should not be inserted into the names of geographic features or artificial structures. For example, 설악산 → Seoraksan and not Seorak-san.

The National Institute of Korean Language has stated that the use of optional hyphens should be discouraged. One member wrote the following:

There are good reasons for why hyphens are not mandated even though there are scenarios where a romanization can be pronounced in two different ways. Firstly, hyphens are visually intrusive symbols. For 강원, "Gangwon" is visually more comfortable [to read] than "Gang-won". [The fact of the matter] is that spellings and pronunciations do not exactly match. This is true for all languages. Even for Korean, 말 (horse) uses a short vowel, and 말 (speech; words) uses a long vowel, but we render them both in Hangul in the same way. In English, "lead" (as in "to lead") is pronounced /liːd/, but "lead" (as in the element lead) is pronounced /lɛd/, but they're spelled identically. Romanization is no exception. We must abandon the idea that romanization must exactly show pronunciation. If someone pronounces "Gangwon" as "Gan-gwon" (간권), then they should just be corrected as needed. Spelling does not perfectly show pronunciation and parts of pronunciation will need to be learned separately anyway. This is why even though we permit you to write 아에 as "a-e", we recommend you write "ae" instead. (Note: 붙임표를 생략하면 한 로마자 표기가 두 가지로 발음될 수 있는데도 붙임표 사용을 강제하지 않은 데는 그만한 이유가 있다. 우선 붙임표는 대단히 눈에 거슬리는 기호라는 점이다. ‘강원’을 Gang-won으로 하기보다는 Gangwon으로 하는 것이 시각적으로 더 편안하다. 그러나 더 중요한 것은 표기와 발음은 완벽하게 일치하지 않는다는 사실이다. 어떤 언어든지 표기가 발음을 정확하게 반영하지는 않는다. 국어의 ‘말〔馬〕’은 모음이 짧고 ‘말〔言〕’은 모음이 길지만 똑같이 ‘말’로 적는다. 영어에서 lead(이끌다)는 발음이 [li:d]이고 lead(납)은 [led]이지만 표기는 같다. 로마자 표기라고 예외는 아니다. 로마자 표기로 발음을 완벽하게 보여 주어야 한다는 생각은 버려야 한다. Gangwon을 ‘간권’으로 발음하는 사람이 있다면 ‘강원’으로 바로잡아 주면 된다. 표기가 발음을 완벽하게 다 보여 주는 것은 아니며 발음은 어차피 따로 익혀야 할 부분이 있다. ‘아에’를 a-e로 쓰는 것을 허용하지만 ae로 쓰기를 더 권장한 까닭이 여기에 있다.)

== Linguistic characteristics ==
The unaspirated consonants ㄱ, ㄷ, ㅂ, and ㅈ are represented as ⟨g⟩, ⟨d⟩, ⟨b⟩, and ⟨j⟩ respectively. The aspirated consonants ㅋ, ㅌ, ㅍ, and ㅊ are represented as ⟨k⟩, ⟨t⟩, ⟨p⟩, ⟨ch⟩. These letter pairs have a similar aspiration distinction in English at the beginning of a syllable (but unlike English do not have a voicing distinction); this approach is also used by Hanyu Pinyin.

When placed in the final position, ㄱ, ㄷ, and ㅂ are romanized as ⟨k⟩, ⟨t⟩, and ⟨p⟩ respectively, as they are neutralized to unreleased stops: 벽 [pjʌk̚] → byeok, 밖 [pak̚] → bak, 부엌 [pu.ʌk̚] → bueok; 벽에 [pjʌ.ɡe] → byeoge, 밖에 [pa.k͈e] → bakke, 부엌에 [pu.ʌ.kʰe] → bueoke, 입 [ip̚] → ip, 입에 [i.be] → ibe.

Vowels ㅓ and ㅡ are written as ⟨eo⟩ and ⟨eu⟩ respectively. However, ㅝ /wʌ/ is written as ⟨wo⟩, not ⟨weo⟩; and ㅢ /ɰi/ is written as ⟨ui⟩, not ⟨eui⟩.

ㅅ in the syllable-initial position is always written as ⟨s⟩. When followed by another consonant or when in the final position, it is written as ⟨t⟩: 옷 [ot̚] → ot (but 옷에 [o.se] → ose).

ㄹ /l/ is ⟨r⟩ before a vowel or a semivowel and ⟨l⟩ everywhere else: 리을 [ɾi.ɯl] → rieul, 철원 [tɕʰʌ.ɾwʌn] → Cheorwon, 울릉도 [ul.lɯŋ.do] → Ulleungdo, 발해 [paɾ.ɦɛ] → Balhae. ㄴ /n/ is written ⟨l⟩ whenever pronounced as a lateral rather than as a nasal consonant: 전라북도 [tɕʌl.la.buk̚.t͈o] → Jeollabuk-do

Phonological changes are reflected where ㄱ, ㄷ, ㅂ and ㅈ are adjacent to ㅎ: 좋고 → joko, 놓다 → nota, 잡혀 → japyeo, 낳지 → nachi. However, aspirated sounds are not reflected in case of nouns where ㅎ follows ㄱ, ㄷ and ㅂ: 묵호 → Mukho, 집현전 → Jiphyeonjeon.

In addition, special provisions are for regular phonological rules in exceptions to transcription (see Korean phonology).

== Reversible variant ==
When reversibility (ability to reliably retrieve Hangul from romanized text) is desired, namely in academic articles, a variant of RR can be applied that allows for a letter-by-letter transliteration. For example, 독립 would be rendered as doglib in the letter-by-letter transliteration, whereas by its normal pronunciation spelling it would be dongnip. In this case, hyphens can be used to denote a soundless syllable-initial ㅇ (except at the beginning of a word). For example, 없었습니다 → eobs-eoss-seubnida.

== Background ==
The new system attempts to address perceived problems in the implementation of the McCune–Reischauer system, such as the phenomena where different consonants and vowels became indistinguishable in the absence of special symbols. To be specific, under the McCune–Reischauer system, the consonants ㄱ (k), ㄷ (t), ㅂ (p) and ㅈ (ch) and ㅋ (k'), ㅌ (t'), ㅍ (p') and ㅊ (ch') became indistinguishable when the apostrophe was removed. In addition, the vowels ㅓ (ŏ) and ㅗ (o), as well as ㅡ (ŭ) and ㅜ (u), became indistinguishable when the breve was removed. Especially in early internet use, where omission of apostrophes and breves is common, this caused confusion. To this end, the system has an explicit goal of using only the 26 letters of the ISO basic Latin alphabet.

The system was developed in anticipation of the 2002 FIFA World Cup, which was to be partly hosted in South Korea.

== Usage ==
=== In South Korea ===
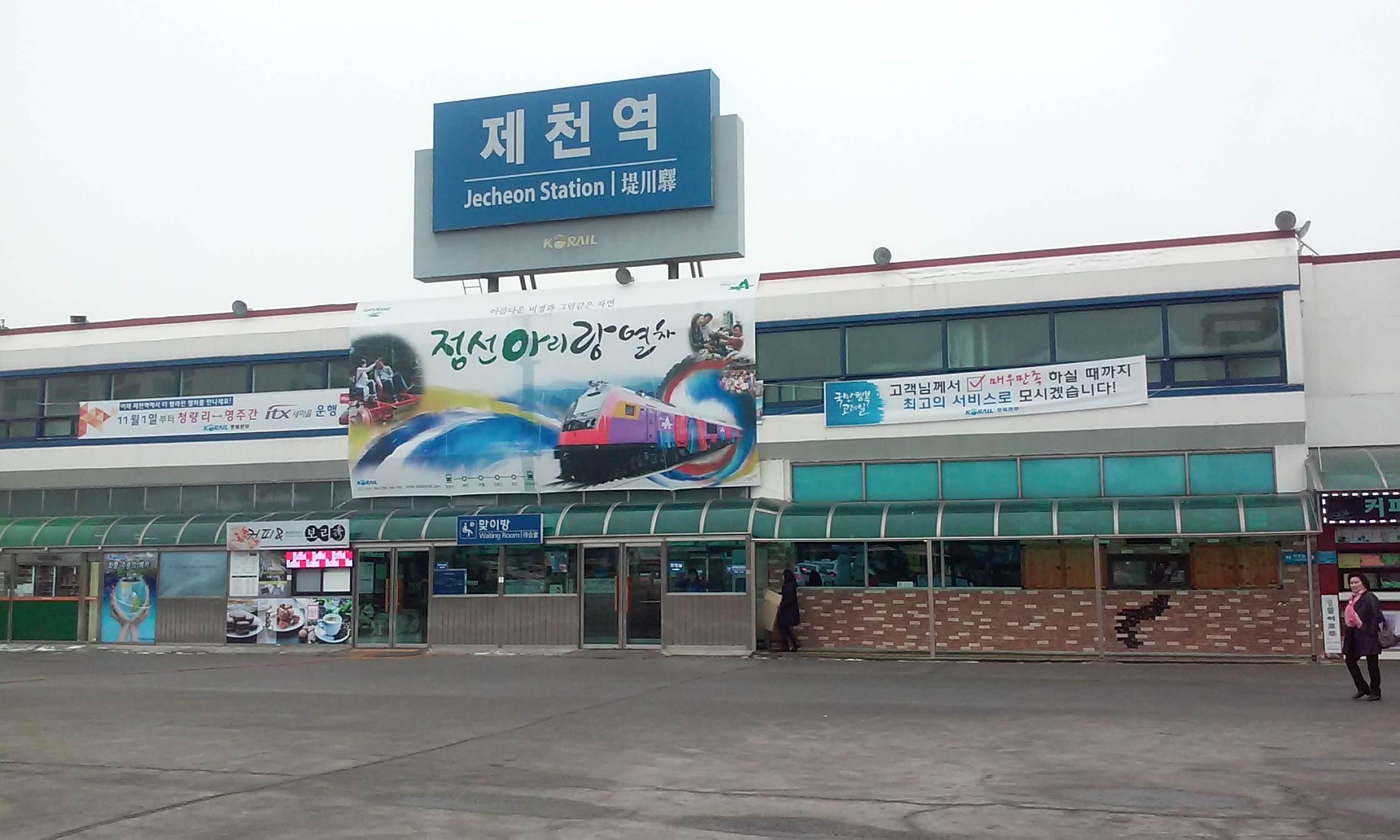
The sign with the name of the railway station in Jecheon — at the top, a writing in Hangul, the transcription in Latin script below using the Revised Romanization and the English translation of the word "station", along with the Hanja text

Almost all road signs, names of railway and subway stations on line maps and signs, etc. have been changed according to Revised Romanization of Korean. It is estimated to have cost at least 500 billion to 600 billion won (€500–600 million) to carry out this procedure. All Korean textbooks, maps and signs to do with cultural heritage were required to comply with the new system by 28 February 2002.

==== Romanizations on South Korean passports ====
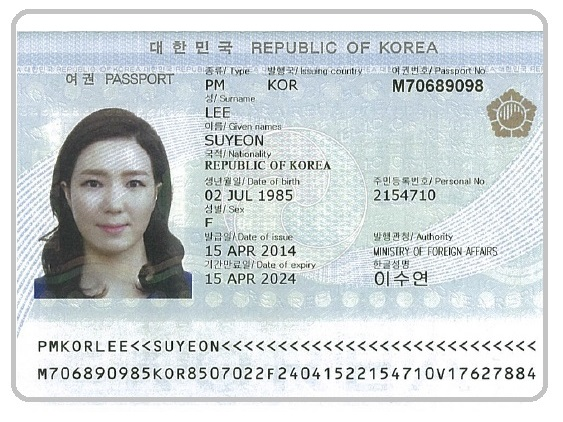
A specimen of the identity information page of a South Korean passport, displaying the romanization of the bearer's name (Lee Suyeon) for international legibility.

A modified version of RR is recommended (though not strictly required) by the South Korean government for romanization of personal names on passports. One example of a modification is discouraging romanizations that resemble words with negative meanings in other languages. For example, 신 is recommended to be romanized as SHIN and not the strict RR form SIN (spelled the same as sin, despite being pronounced differently). The recommendations are not strictly required; ad-hoc romanizations are allowed, and have been increasingly permitted over time due to a number of court cases.
