= Origin of Hangul =

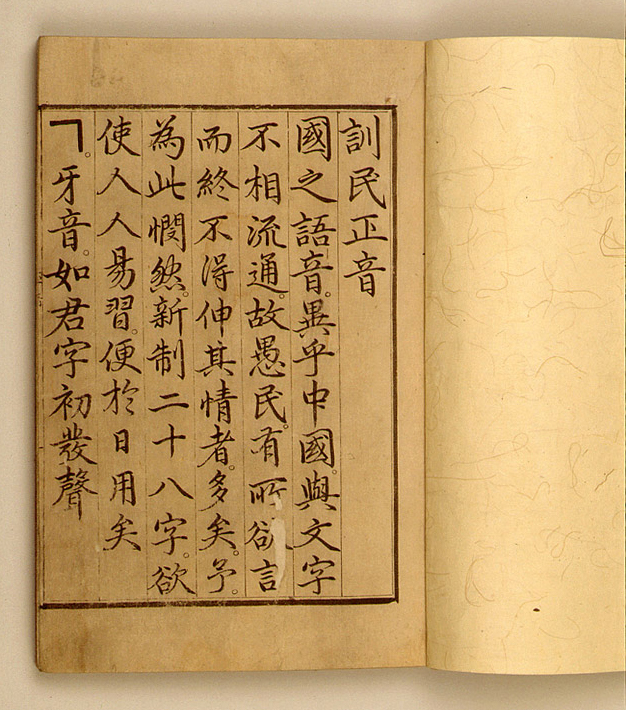
First page of the Hunminjeongeum, the work that officially introduces Hangul. Depicted is the introduction by Sejong the Great.

The native Korean alphabet, called Hangeul (한글) in South Korea and Chosŏn'gŭl (조선글) in North Korea, is a writing system for the Korean language. It was mostly completed around late 1443 to early 1444 and officially published in 1446. It was invented to serve a number of purposes, especially to aid general literacy in Korea.

Before the invention of Hangul, Korea had been using Hanja (Chinese characters) and variants of it to write Korean. However, the script was poorly suited for transcribing Korean, and its difficulty contributed to high illiteracy amongst commoners.

King Sejong the Great (r. 1418–1450) was responsible for Hangul's creation. Most scholars believe Sejong was significantly personally involved in creating the script and worked on the script alongside one or more others. A minority of scholars believe that he was the sole creator of it. The script was possibly largely designed in secret, possibly in anticipation of the backlash that the script eventually received, although this is debated.

According to the Hunminjeongeum Haerye, one of the two texts written to introduce Hangul, the shapes of Hangul letters (called jamo) are designed to reflect the shapes of speech organs and concepts in Chinese philosophy. Hangul also received inspiration from Chinese linguistic theory of the time, although these theories were innovated upon and adapted to suit Korean phonology. Some scholars believe that Hangul received minor inspiration from the Tibetan-Mongolian script ʼPhags-pa, although that hypothesis still argues that Hangul was largely original.

== Historiography ==
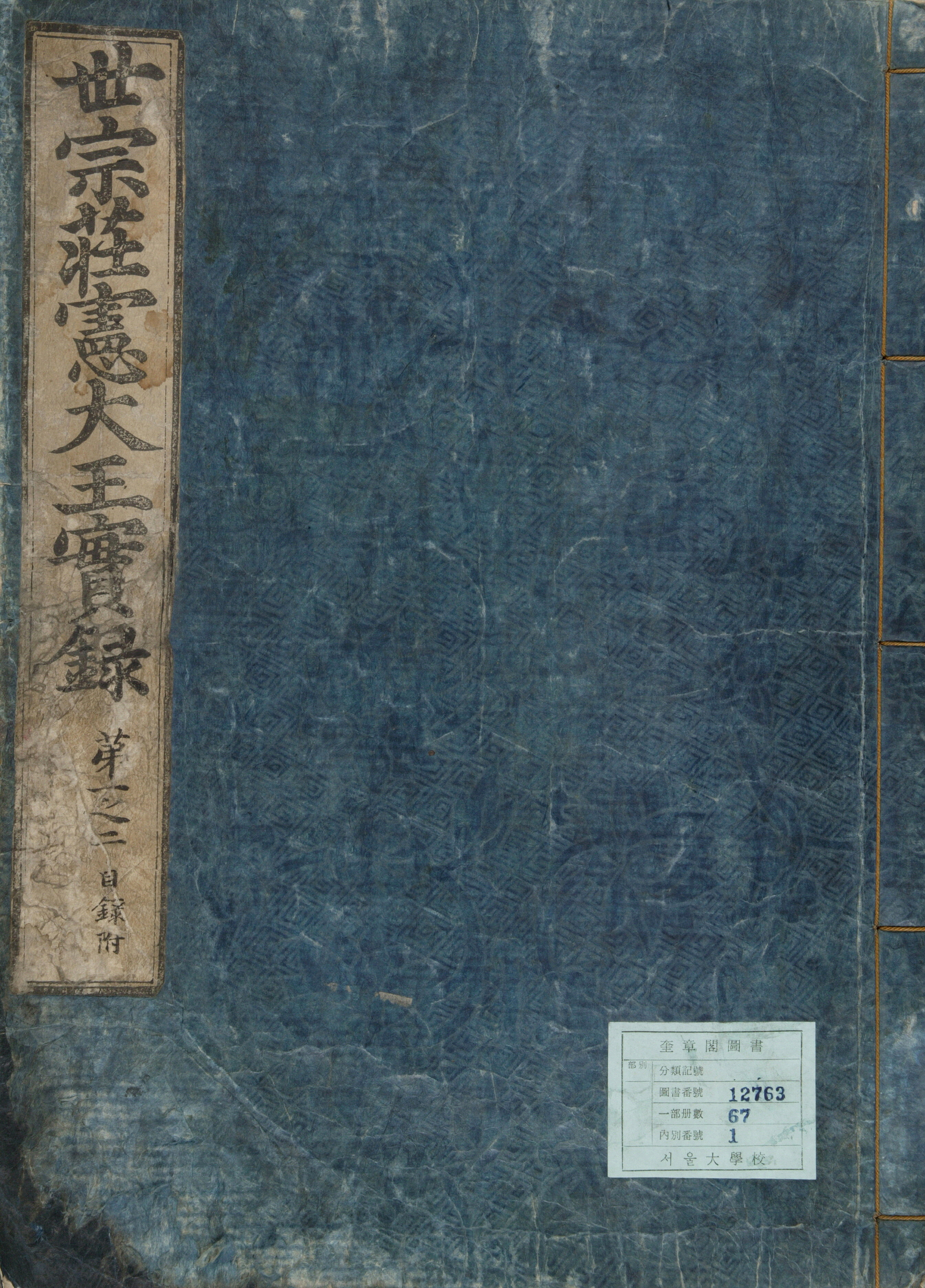
Cover of the first volume of the Veritable Records of Sejong

There are extremely few known pieces of contemporary evidence on when and how Hangul was created. The main sources of information are the announcement of Hangul around 1443 or 1444 CE and the rebuke of Hangul in 1444 CE, which are both part of the Veritable Records of Sejong, as well as the treatises of 1446 used to promulgate Hangul: the Hunminjeongeum and the Hunminjeongeum Haerye. Scholars have also attempted to make inferences based on other less direct pieces of evidence as well.

The Veritable Records of Sejong, part of the Veritable Records of the Joseon Dynasty, were produced by government historians after the death of Sejong based on primary sources. Historians had editorial jurisdiction, independent from the king, on what to include in the Records. Several historians have argued that the personal opinions of the historians have impacted the Records' coverage of Hangul.

The treatises of 1446 were originally published as a single book, with the Haerye being a commentary book for the Hunminjeongeum. They are of separate authorship; the Hunminjeongeum was authored by Sejong himself, while the Haerye was written by a group of scholars led by Chŏng Inji. While the Hunminjeongeum remained in the historical record, the Haerye was eventually lost and forgotten, possibly by the early 16th century. In 1940, a copy of it was rediscovered. Its discovery dramatically altered scholarship on Hangul.

Gari Ledyard (1932–2021), a significant Western authority on the history of Hangul, was critical of early Western scholarship on Hangul and Korea in general. He argues that "few today would accept either their methodology or most of their conclusions" and that Western scholars often insufficiently accounted for Korean history and documentary evidence on the script's creation, and instead relied mostly on comparing the shapes and sounds of letters. According to Ledyard, Western scholarship on Hangul slowly evolved and improved over time.

== Background ==
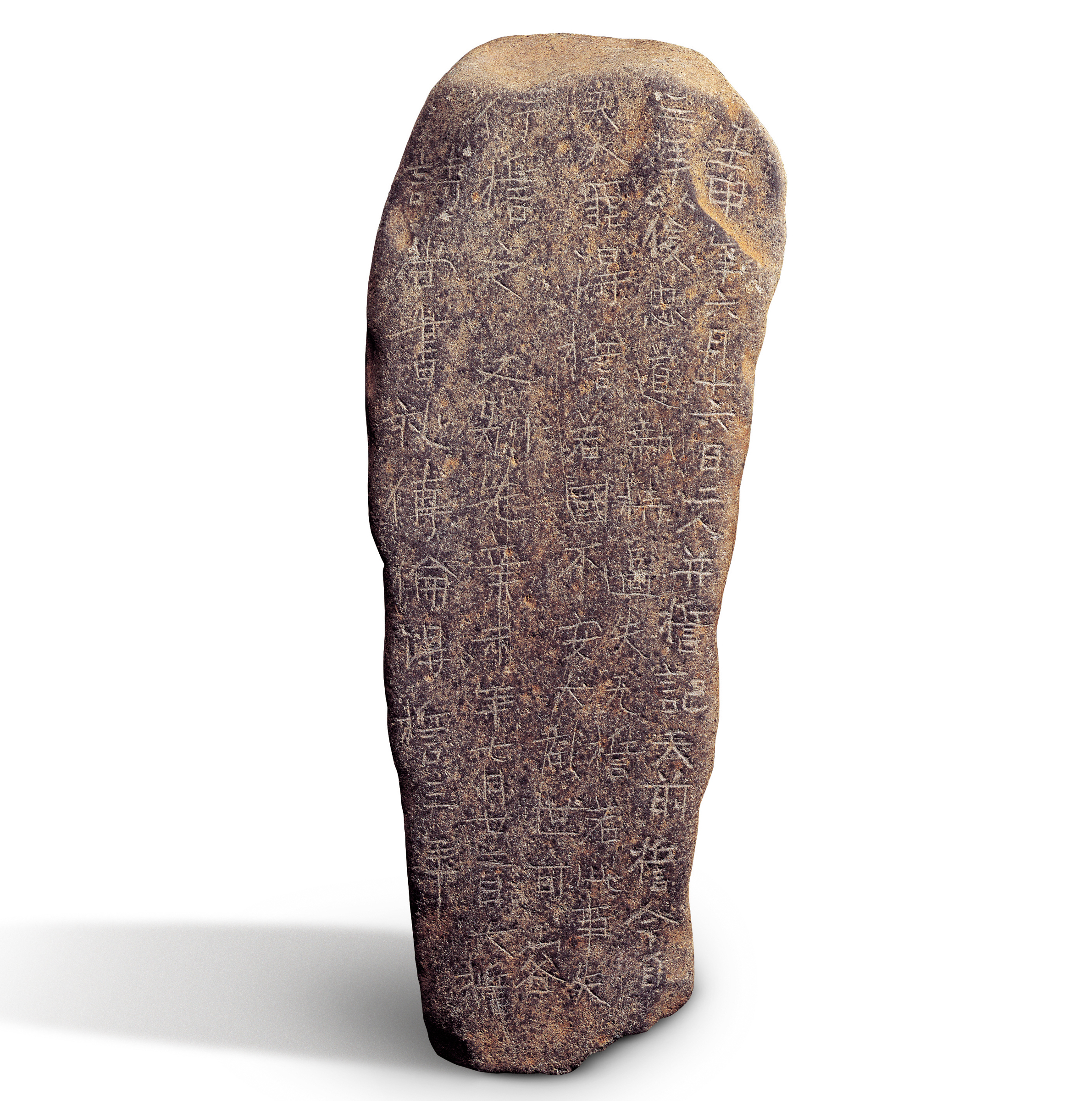
The Idu script, used to write Korean, appears on this 6th- or 7th-century stone tablet. Here, Chinese characters have their meaning preserved, but their order is changed to be more Koreanic.

Before the invention of Hangul, Korea had been using Hanja (Chinese characters) since antiquity. The difficulty of the script limited its use to mostly upper-class people; commoners were largely illiterate. The script is not well suited for representing the Korean language; the Chinese and Korean languages are not related and differ in significant ways. For example, Classical Chinese uses subject–verb–object word order while Middle Korean uses subject–object–verb word order. Korean pronunciation and ideas could only be indirectly represented. Some efforts were made to adapt the script to suit Korean, which resulted in the Idu script and its varieties, including Hyangch'al. Scholars have evaluated these scripts as complicated and difficult to decipher, and thus not useful for promoting widespread literacy.

=== Beginning of work on Hangul ===
It is not known when work began on developing Hangul, nor what the process looked like. Scholars have attempted to approximate when Hangul began to be developed by examining previous events in Sejong's reign. Ledyard argues that one possible motivator for Hangul's creation was the 1431 pharmacological survey of Korea. Numerous Korean plants only had Korean-language names for them and their names had to be recorded in the book; in the end their names were recorded in an approximate phonetic fashion. Ledyard argues that a 1433 survey of native Korean music likely faced similar issues, although the results of said survey are not known. Several historians have argued that, in 1434, Sejong indirectly vocalized interest in universal literacy when he expressed frustration that commoners would not be able to read the didactic book on Confucian morals Samganghaengsilto. A decade later, after Hangul was announced, Sejong reiterated this frustration with regards to that text. Despite this, a Hangul version of that text would only be produced by the reign of King Seongjong (r. 1469–1495).

Sejong had long studied the Chinese script and language and their relationship with the Korean language. On several occasions he bemoaned the impacts that the lack of proficiency in Chinese and Chinese characters had on the administration of the state. Some scholars have thus argued that Sejong may have been instead or partially motivated to create Hangul as a tool for aiding Koreans with the Chinese language and script. Ledyard argues that Chinese phonological theory at the time was insufficient for grasping the historical linguistics of Chinese, and that Hangul may have been developed to help address this concern.

==== Potential secrecy in Hangul's development ====
Scholars have debated on if Hangul was possibly developed in secret, especially from Sejong's court. The paucity of records has, in part, motivated such hypotheses. To Ledyard's interpretation, Hangul's announcement apparently came as a surprise to the mainline Hall of Worthies. Historian Sixiang Wang argued that the script was likely kept a secret from Ming China, as Ming would have preferred that its tributary state, Joseon, use the Chinese script.

Linguist Ahn Pyong-hi argues against the secrecy hypothesis. He argues that the hypothesis relies on inferences and not direct evidence. To his view, Sejong did not need to fear opposition, as he was sufficiently capable of handling it. Ahn also argues that Hangul's lack of coverage in the Veritable Records could potentially be explained by the court historians determining that the records they included were sufficient for covering the topic. Ahn also interprets several sentences in the rebuke of Hangul and in other texts as suggesting that others could have been aware of Hangul before its 1443 announcement.

== Early history of Hangul ==
=== Announcement and backlash ===
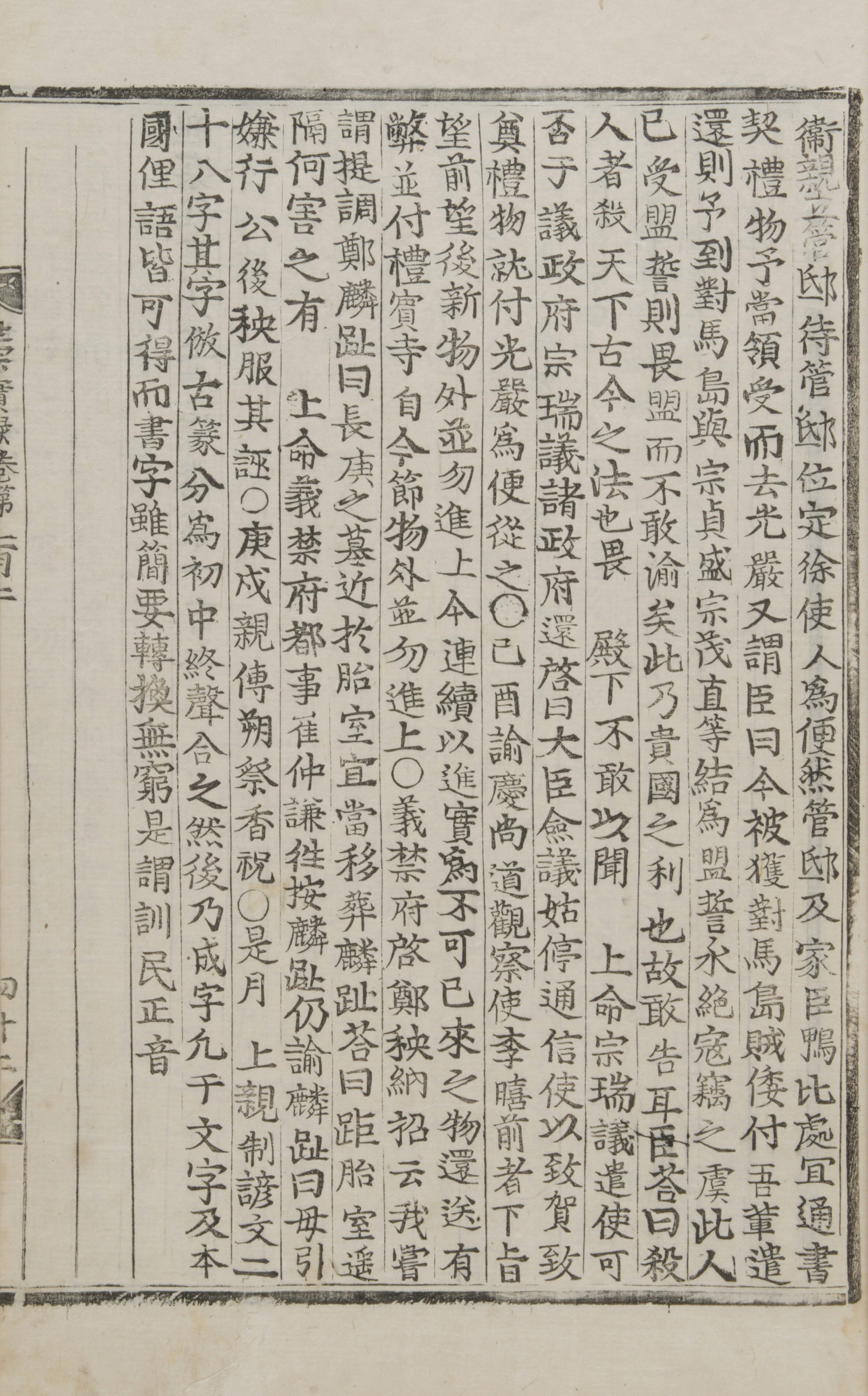
The page of the Veritable Records containing that text's first attestation to Hangul (leftmost three lines)

The following is the first mention of Hangul in the Veritable Records of the Joseon Dynasty:

This month, His Highness personally created the twenty-eight letters (Note: Ch'oe Malli's rebuke of Hangul contains a mention that Hangul has 27 letters, but this is generally regarded as a printing error. Despite this, linguist Ahn Pyong-hi argues it cannot be ruled out that the number of letters had shifted between the announcement of Hangul and this point, although Hangul was eventually promulgated with 28 letters.) of the Vernacular Script. Its letters imitate the Old Seal, and are divided into initial, medial and terminal sounds. Once one combines them, they form a syllable. All [sounds] in both Chinese characters and in the rustic language of this country may be written. Although they are simple and fine, they shift and change [in function] without end. These are called the "Correct Sounds for the Instruction of the People."

— Veritable Records of Sejong, 30th day, 12th month of 1443

The above record documents an informal internal announcement of Hangul, and not its official promulgation. While the design of the script was probably mostly complete by this announcement, the script would not be officially published until 1446, after documentation for it was completed. A demonstration of the script was held, wherein clerks were assembled to learn how the script worked.

A major faction in the Hall began moving to condemn the script. That faction, centered around one of the Hall's highest-ranking members Ch'oe Malli, had been growing increasingly critical of Sejong. This was due to a number of reasons, with one major reason being Sejong's affinity for Buddhism, which was viewed with hostility by Confucianists of the time. Around two months after the announcement of Hangul, Ch'oe submitted a now famous rebuke of Hangul to Sejong, abridged below:

Ever since the time of our royal ancestors, our court has served the Great with utmost sincerity and abided respectfully by the Chinese institutions exclusively... [But now, Your Highness] has created the Vulgar Script, which we see and hear with astonishment... [C]ombining graphs using sounds is completely the opposite of the ancient [ways], and truly there is no basis for it... From antiquity in the Nine Regions, although local customs have differed, there has never been a case of creating a written language based on local speech. The categories of Mongolians, Tanguts, Jurchen, Japanese, and Tibetans all have their own graphs, but these are just matters of the barbarians and are not worth mentioning.

— Veritable Records of Sejong, 20th day, 2nd month of 1444

Sejong and the anti-Hangul faction then engaged in a fierce debate, with scribes apparently struggling to document the technical arguments made. The anti-Hangul faction expressed concern about a native Korean script being too far a departure from Chinese civilization, which they insisted Korea should be deferent to in a Confucian manner. Sejong rebutted that he felt the script was Confucian, as it was created out of a desire to benefit his subjects. Anti-Hangul sentiment was also partially motivated by elitism; literacy in Hanja was then seen as a status symbol, and promoting general literacy could be seen as harming the social positions of the elite. The script was commonly called ŏnmun (언문; 諺文; lit. 'vernacular script'), which developed an elitist connotation of "vulgar writing".

Ch'oe and several of the scholars that rebuked Sejong were imprisoned for a single day. To Ledyard's knowledge, the rebuke and debate are the only surviving official records of complaints about Hangul from Sejong's time. According to historian Sixiang Wang, modern sentiment has lionized Sejong and vilified Ch'oe in this debate.

=== Work on documentation and rhyme dictionaries ===
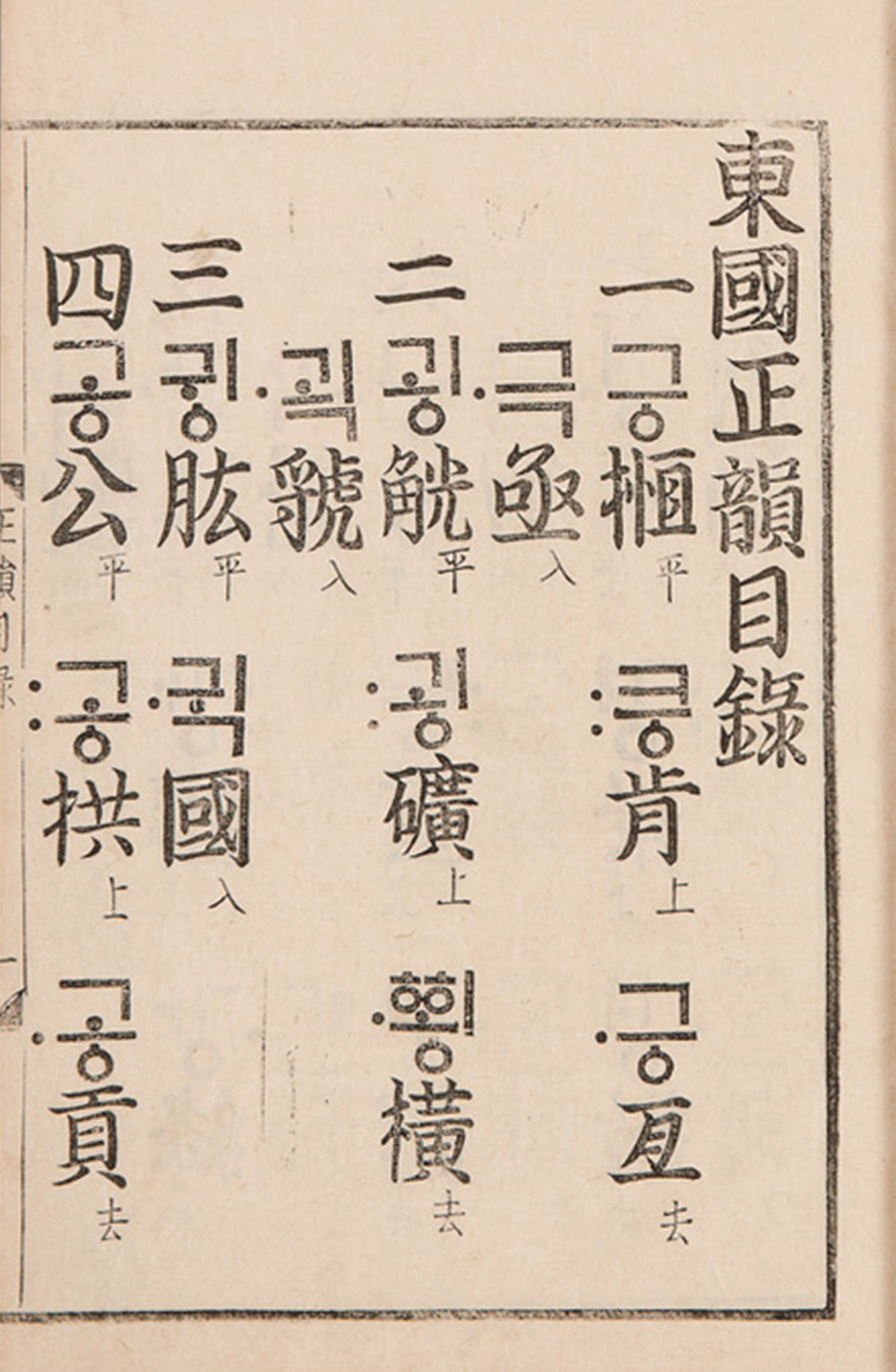
A page of a copy of the Tongguk chŏngun

Due to the anti-Hangul faction's opposition, Sejong relied on younger men of the Hall of Worthies for help in applying and developing the official documentation for the script. By Ledyard's analysis, these men had an average age of around 28. Significant among them was Sin Sukchu, who was known to have a talent for languages. At some point, possibly soon after the announcement of the script, Sejong ordered the establishment of the office Ŏnmunch'ŏng (lit. 'Vernacular Script Commission'). (Note: Ledyard argues that Ŏnmunch'ŏng was likely not the name of the department at the time, and that that name was likely inserted into the Veritable Records of Sejong by anti-Hangul literati. The office's official establishment is recorded in the Veritable Records as on the 8th day, 11th month of 1446, but Ledyard argues the office was likely active before this, likely soon after Sejong announced the script. Either way, scholarly work was actively being performed on Hangul before 1446.) This office went on to complete a number of seminal Hangul texts.

Rhyme dictionaries were influential on the development of Hangul and its documentation. Sejong and Sin Sukchu had been deeply interested in such dictionaries even before Hangul's announcement, and Hangul's design and documentation reflect sound classification principles of several rhyme dictionaries. The first major Hangul-related project undertaken by the Ŏnmunch'ŏng was the translation of a rhyme dictionary: Gujin yunhui juyao. Sejong ordered its compilation days before Ch'oe's rebuke of Hangul. The project was possibly never completed. The Ŏnmunch'ŏng possibly switched to focusing on compiling another rhyme dictionary Tongguk chŏngun, which was published in 1447. The work served as a major standard for Sino-Korean pronunciation for the next several decades, although modern scholars have described it as overly prescriptive and artificial. Work continued on rhyme dictionaries even after the Tongguk chŏngun; the Sasŏng t'onggo (사성통고; 四聲通攷) was published some time before 1455, and the Hongmu chŏngun yŏkhun was published in 1455.

=== Promulgation ===
In the 9th month of 1446, Hunminjeongeum and its companion commentary text Hunminjeongeum Haerye were officially completed; together the texts officially introduced Hangul and illustrated its use. The Hunminjeongeum was penned by Sejong himself, while the Haerye was compiled by a group of scholars of the Ŏnmunch'ŏng led by Chŏng Inji. The latter includes a defense of the script using Confucian reasoning. The Hunminjeongeum begins with this now-famous preface:

The sounds of our country's language are different from those of the Middle Kingdom and are not confluent with the sounds of characters. Therefore, among the ignorant people, there have been many who, having something they want to put into words, have in the end been unable to express their feelings. I have been distressed because of this, and have newly designed twenty-eight letters, which I wish to have everyone practice at their ease and make convenient for their daily use.

— Sejong the Great, Hunminjeongeum, preface

Sejong attempted to integrate Hangul into government functions, to limited success. Various efforts to promote Hangul that he initiated fizzled out especially after his death. While the royal family and court women were significant early adopters of Hangul, the script would not begin to see wider adoption until the mid-16th century.

== Date of creation ==
An exact creation day for Hangul is difficult to determine based on known evidence. The announcement of Hangul is documented in a 30th day, 12th month of 1443 entry in the Veritable Records. However, the entry says the announcement was made some time during that month; Ledyard argues that that Sejong likely introduced the script before, and not exactly on that date. In the Julian calendar, that month corresponds to between December 21, 1443, and January 19, 1444. In the Gregorian calendar, it corresponds to between December 30, 1443, and January 28, 1444.

The promulgation date for Hangul is also unclear. The Veritable Records of Sejong copy of the Hunminjeongeum is contained in a 29th day, 9th month of 1446 entry. However, that entry says that the says Hunminjeongeum was published some time during that month. The postface to the Haerye is dated to the first ten days (상한; 上澣) of the 9th month of 1446. If the 10th day is assumed, that is October 9 in the Gregorian calendar. Hangul Day, which commemorates Hangul's invention, is celebrated on that day in South Korea. North Korea celebrates Hangul Day on January 15; it is unknown exactly why this date is used.

== Authorship ==
It is not known how large of a role Sejong had in the development of Hangul. Evidence on the topic is extremely sparse; Lee argues that all modern hypotheses are consequently based largely on speculation and inferences.

Three main categories of hypotheses have been raised. The first is the "cooperation hypothesis" (협찬설; 協贊說; hyŏpch'ansŏl), (Note: Ahn calls this the "His Majesty's invention and cooperation hypothesis" (친제협찬설; 親制協贊說; ch'injehyŏpch'ansŏl).) where Sejong actively worked on Hangul himself, alongside other scholars. The second is the "command hypothesis" (명제설; 命制說; myŏngjesŏl), where Sejong commanded his subjects to design Hangul and otherwise did not much participate. The third is the "His Majesty's invention hypothesis", (Note: Hypothesis name translated based on Lee's translation of the phrase.) where Sejong designed the script on his own (친제설; 親制說; ch'injesŏl).

Lee, in a 2009 paper, claims that a majority of scholars believe in the cooperation hypothesis, and that few advocate for the command hypothesis. Hyeon-hie Lee claims in a 2010 paper that most scholars believe the cooperation or His Majesty's invention hypotheses, with few supporting the command hypothesis. Linguist Ahn Pyong-hi claims in a 2004 paper, based on research from the 1980s, that the cooperation hypothesis is dominant in North Korea. Linguists Sungdai Cho and John Whitman claim in a 2019 book that most scholars do not believe the His Majesty's invention hypothesis.

=== Command hypothesis ===
A number of Korean scholars have expressed support of the command hypotheses for centuries. Lee identified an early attestation to the command hypothesis in the writings of Sŏng Hyŏn (1439–1504). Lee argues Sŏng made several incorrect claims about the script that make his narrative of events unreliable. Yu Hŭi wrote in the 1824 text Ŏnmunji that "Our King Sejong the Great commanded his scholarly retainers to imitate the form of Mongolian writing and to make inquiries of Huang Zan, and thus created the Vernacular Script." Korean linguist Chu Sigyŏng wrote in 1906 that Sejong commanded others to develop Hangul.

A number of scholars have expressed support of the command hypothesis.

=== Cooperation hypothesis ===
A number of scholars have expressed support of the cooperation hypothesis. Ledyard described Sejong as "the chief expert and principal researcher" of the project.

Canadian Koreanist James Scarth Gale wrote in 1912 that Sejong, Chŏng Inji, Sŏng Sammun, Sin Sukchu, and Ch'oe Hang were primarily responsible for the alphabet.

Although Lee argues in favor of the His Majesty's invention hypothesis, he identifies an attestation to Crown Prince Yi Hyang having helped his father develop the script as plausible.

Ahn believes that eight people of the Hall of Worthies that are mentioned in the preface of the Haerye also assisted Sejong in developing Hangul. These people are: Chŏng Inji, Ch'oe Hang, Pak P'aengnyŏn, Sin Sukchu, Sŏng Sammun, Kang Hŭian, Yi Kae, and Yi Hyŏllo. While Ahn argues against Sejong being the sole creator, he believes that Sejong still had a sizable role in Hangul's creation and that the cooperation hypothesis does not diminish the impressiveness of Hangul's invention. Ahn also argues that one or more of Sejong's sons may have assisted him, including the crown prince, Grand Prince Suyang, and Grand Prince Anp'yŏng. Several records soon after Hangul's announcement mention that the princes were working on projects related to Hangul.

=== His Majesty's invention hypothesis ===
A number of scholars have attributed the development of the script mainly to Sejong.

==== Arguments in favor ====
Documentary evidence from around the introduction and promulgation of Hangul, including writings of the anti-Hangul faction, universally indicate that Sejong was the primary inventor of the script. Ki-Moon Lee argues that the Veritable Records also uniquely attributes the script to Sejong by describing it as "His Majesty's invention" (친제; 親制). Lee argues that, while it is tempting to believe that the Veritable Records would in general attempt to flatter Sejong by falsely attributing accomplishments to him, this is the only instance where the Veritable Records uses that wording with regard to accomplishments during Sejong's reign. Lee further argues that Hangul was likely intentionally developed in secrecy, and that involvement of other people would have hindered that. Lee also argues that Sejong had the appropriate intellectual background and subject matter expertise to develop the script, and that he showed a deep understanding of it himself. For example, Sejong apparently disagreed with linguists that worked on the Haerye and pushed to enforce his vision of Hangul orthography on literary projects that he is known to have been heavily involved with. Cho and Whitman evaluated Lee's argument about Sejong's deep understanding of the topic as strong. Joe Jungno Ree found some of Lee's arguments compelling but overall expressed skepticism of the hypothesis.

Linguist Jae Jung Song argued that "[t]here is now ample evidence that [Hangul] was [Sejong's] own invention, not the outcome of his collaboration with other scholars, although he must have consulted leading scholars".

==== Arguments against ====
Many scholars have assumed that Sejong would have been too busy with the affairs of state to invent Hangul. Lee provided a 1989 quote from Japanese linguist Kōno Rokurō as evidence of this:

The date and the creator of han'gŭl are known quite clearly. These letters were personally devised by Sejong... Nevertheless, although King Sejong, as the greatest monarch of the Yi dynasty, had many accomplishments and was a gifted man of ample education, it cannot be imagined that the king of a nation, busy with the affairs of state, could have, from conceptualization to concrete realization, produced these new letters completely by himself. At King Sejong's disposal was an institution called the [Hall of Worthies] [...], and so it is certain that there were those who helped the king...

Ahn summarized several arguments against the hypothesis as follows:

As can be seen in the phrase 'the king's reading in the late hours of the night' (乙夜之覽), the king's only spare time for research or the launching of new enterprises was late at night. It is difficult to believe that the invention of [Hangul] was achieved through fragmentary study in the hours of the night. The conclusion is that although Sejong was at the center of the invention process, he was aided by the [Hall of Worthies] scholars...

Lee, who supports the hypothesis, rebuts that such arguments are inferences and are not based on direct evidence.

Ahn argues against the hypothesis. He argues that because Hangul reflects principles in the rhyme dictionary Tongguk chŏngun, which is known to have taken multiple scholars years of effort to create (although its major principles were likely complete by 1443), it seems unlikely that Sejong would have been able to perform all that work on his own. He also argues that, while Sejong attributes the Hunminjeongeum to himself in that text's preface, on another occasion Sejong vocalized personal responsibility for work on the Tongguk chŏngun, despite it being known that Sejong worked alongside other scholars for that text.

=== Princess Chŏngŭi hypothesis ===
According to Ahn, a 1994 paper by linguist Ri Ga-won argues that Sejong's second daughter Princess Chŏngŭi was the creator of Hangul. The claim caused a stir in the press. Ahn expresses skepticism of that claim and others made in Ri's paper. He argues that the hypothesis is fringe, and that Ri uncritically bases her information on a claim made in a mid-19th document, entitled Mongyuyadam (몽유야담; 夢遊野談), that was far removed from the creation of Hangul.

== Official narrative for letter design ==
The Hunminjeongeum Haerye gives a number of explanations for the design of Hangul letters, although Ledyard disputes aspects of their explanations.

=== Consonants ===
Hangul's consonants were partially influenced by centuries of Chinese linguistic theory, although Hangul modified and innovated upon that theory to suit Korean phonology. The Chinese fanqie linguistic system splits Chinese syllables into two parts: the initial (initial consonant) and the final (also called "rhyme"; everything after the initial). The system also classifies consonants; Sejong and his court were likely most familiar with a version of the system that prescribes 36 classes. (Note: This version is described in the text Queyun zhizhang tu (切韻指掌圖), which was known to Sejong's court.) Correspondingly, the Haerye describes Hangul consonants using these classifications, although not all classifications receive a Hangul letter and a number of these letters were mostly used for the transcription of Chinese.

The 36 Chinese initials and their Korean transcriptions
Artic. Class		Wholly clear 全清	Partly clear 次清	Wholly muddy 全濁	Neither clear nor muddy 不清不濁	Wholly clear 全清	Wholly muddy 全濁
Molar 牙音		見 ㄱ	谿 ㅋ	羣 ㄲ	疑 ㆁ		
Linguals 舌音	Apical 舌頭音	端 ㄷ	透 ㅌ	定 ㄸ	泥 ㄴ		
Linguals 舌音	Raised 舌上音	知	徹	澄	娘		
Labials 脣音	Heavy 唇音輕	幫 ㅂ	滂 ㅍ	並 ㅃ	明 ㅁ		
Labials 脣音	Light 唇輕音	非 ㅸ	敷 ㆄ	奉 ㅹ	微 ㅱ		
Incisors 齒音	Apical 齒頭音	精 ㅈ (ᅎ (Note: These letters, while not introduced in the Hunminjeongeum or Haerye, were developed shortly afterwards and exclusively used to transcribe Chinese.))	清 ㅊ (ᅔ)	從 ㅉ (ᅏ)		心 ㅅ (ᄼ)	邪 ㅆ (ᄽ)
Incisors 齒音	Upright 正齒音	照 (ᅐ)	穿 (ᅕ)	牀 (ᅑ)		審 (ᄾ)	禪 (ᄿ)
Laryngeals 喉音		影 ㆆ	曉 ㅎ	匣 ㆅ	喩 ㅇ		
Semilinguals 半舌音					來 ㄹ		
Semiincisors 半齒音					日 ㅿ		
Notes:

The Haerye claims that the consonants of Hangul are mostly related to each other by a principle of adding strokes to basic shapes (called gahoek; kahoek; 가획; 加劃). The basic shapes are claimed to depict the outline of speech organs during the pronunciation of the letter's sound. IPA values given in this section correspond to the sound value at the time of Hangul's promulgation.

- ㄱ ([k]) depicts the root of the tongue blocking the upper palate
- ㄴ ([n]) depicts the tongue touching the upper palate
- ㅁ ([m]) depicts the mouth
- ㅅ ([s]) depicts the incisor
- ㅇ ([∅] or [ɦ]) depicts the throat

Strokes are added to the above letters to represent related sounds that are more "severe" (려; 厲):

- ㄱ → ㅋ ([kʰ])
- ㄴ → ㄷ ([t]) → ㅌ ([tʰ])
- ㅁ → ㅂ (Note: Sang-Oak Lee and other scholars argue that ㅂ should be considered to have just one more stroke more than ㅁ, because the latter is written with three brush strokes and the former four.) ([p]) → ㅍ ([pʰ])
- ㅅ → ㅈ ([c]) → ㅊ ([cʰ])
- ㅇ → ㆆ ([ʔ]) → ㅎ ([h])

For most characters, strokes relate characters across the same sound class. The Haerye acknowledges several exceptions to this that have been dubbed the ich'e characters (이체자; 異體字):

- ㆁ ([ŋ]) belongs to the molar class, yet has a stroke added from ㅇ of the laryngeal class. ㅇ is a null or zero initial. An initial ng sound was a then-disappearing feature of the Chinese language. Thus, there was perceived to be a relationship between the disappearing initial ng sound ㆁ and the null initial ㅇ. (Note: Ledyard argues that ㆁ is unlikely to have ever been useful as an initial consonant for Korean, as that language likely never had an initial ng sound, and that it was mostly meant for representing Chinese.)
- ㄹ ([l]) depicts the tongue and is in the semilingual class. It has strokes added to it from ㄴ, which is of the lingual class.
- ㅿ ([z]) depicts the incisor and is in the semiincisor class. It has a stroke added to it from ㅅ, which is of the incisor class.

Other consonants are derived by duplicating or combining the above consonants. Duplicated consonants were originally meant to be used only for the transcription of Chinese.

=== Vowels ===
Fanqie does not describe vowels, and thus Hangul departed from and innovated upon fanqie by introducing them. Hangul divides each syllable into an initial (초성; 初聲), medial (중성; 中聲), and terminal (종성; 終聲). The medial is functionally a vowel sound. The inclusion of vowel letters makes Hangul a true alphabet.

The Hunminjeongeum introduces three basic vowels:

- ㆍ ([ʌ])
- ㅡ ([ɨ])
- ㅣ ([i])

One or two ㆍ are added to ㅡ or ㅣ to yield these other vowels:

- ㅗ ([o])
- ㅏ ([a])
- ㅛ ([yo])
- ㅑ ([ya])
- ㅜ ([u])
- ㅓ ([ə])
- ㅠ ([yu])
- ㅕ ([yə])

The above vowels can again be combined to yield other vowels.

=== Philosophical justifications ===
According to the Haerye, Hangul's design incorporates elements of Chinese philosophy. The text references Zhu Xi's concept of li a number of times. Li is a belief in underlying patterns and order in the natural world. The Haerye argues that Hangul was not invented but discovered from these underlying patterns.

Consonant philosophical associations
Jamo Conc.	ㄱ	ㄴ	ㅁ	ㅅ	ㅇ
Five sounds (Note: Categories from fanqie; also corresponds to relevant organs in producing speech.) 五聲	Molar 牙	Lingual 舌	Labial 脣	Incisor 齒	Laryngeal 喉
Five elements 五行	Wood 木	Fire 火	Earth 土	Metal 金	Water 水
Five seasons 五時	Spring 春	Summer 夏	Term-summer (Note: Ledyard's translation. Ledyard argues that Chinese philosophers arbitrarily made this a season in order to align it with other groups of five.) 季夏	Fall 秋	Winter 冬
Five notes (Note: Notes of the pentatonic scale. Notated in solfège, per Ledyard's practice.) 五音	Sol 角	Mi 徵	Do 宮	Re 商	La 羽
Five directions 五方	East 東	South 南	Center 末	West 西	North 北
Notes:

Several modern scholars have skeptically described a number of the above Chinese philosophical concepts (and consequently their link to Hangul) as seeming contrived and forced.

The Haerye argues that the three fundamental vowels of Hangul correspond to concepts from the text I Ching, particularly yin and yang. It argues that ㅡ corresponds to yin (symbolizing earth), ㆍ to yang (symbolizing the sun), and ㅣ to man (neutral). The remaining vowels are derived from these. It also argues that the derived vowels can be classified as yin and yang, with ㅜ, ㅓ, ㅠ, and ㅕ being yin and ㅗ, ㅏ, ㅛ, and ㅑ being yang. The rationale given for this is that yin characters have dots "emerging from the earth" as they are below and inside, while yang characters are the opposite and "emerge from heaven".

The yin, yang, and man groupings correspond to classifications for vowel harmony. Yin vowels could only occur with yin vowels and yang with yang. Man could go with either. For example, 아ᄃᆞᆯ (atol; lit. 'son') contains two yang vowels.

== Hypotheses around letter development ==
Linguist Sang-Oak Lee argues that the letters were possibly initially developed in a "trial and error" method, without a clear narrative (such as the stroke addition rule) that unified them together. He argued that, because Hangul changed several times in its early history, it seemed less like Hangul was developed from the top-down based on such rules and more like the rules were developed to justify the letters, although the rules possibly had some influence on the shapes as well.

Lee analyzes why various alternate letter shapes were not used. For example, the mirror images (along vertical axis) of ㄱ, ㅋ, and ㄴ. Lee argues that these were not used because Hangul letters tend to minimize the number of brush strokes needed. Lee also analyzes why the character derived from ㅂ was ㅍ and not a character resembling 日. He argues this was likely decided against because it is easy to visually confuse with ㅌ, the mirror image of ㅌ, and ㄹ.

While ㅿ is a voiced variant of ㅅ, other consonants like ㄱ, ㄷ, and ㅂ do not have voiced variants. Ledyard argues this is because such variants would not fit into the sound classes prescribed in the contemporary version of fanqie.

== Hypothesized inspirations for Hangul ==
It is debated if Hangul was a mostly original invention or if it was based on or inspired by one or more other writing systems of the time. Most other major writing systems of the world descend or were derived from others, but it is debated if such is the case for Hangul. Linguist Chin-Woo Kim argues that is "highly unlikely that any one [hypothesis on influences on Hangul] is exclusively right", as Sejong and his court were well-studied in the languages and scripts of Korea's neighbors.

=== Original invention ===
The original invention hypothesis is dominant among South Korean academics.

Ledyard doubts the original invention hypotheses. He argues that the traditional Chinese philosophical principles that the script claims to be inspired from seem like post hoc justifications. Ledyard hypothesized that these justifications may have been intended to defend Hangul by making criticisms of Hangul seem like criticisms of Chinese philosophy.

Taylor and Taylor argue that, while it is possible that Hangul received some influence from Chinese characters or ʼPhags-pa, the influence is minor enough that Hangul "should be described as a unique creation". Linguist Ross King finds none of the inspiration theories sufficiently convincing over the original invention hypothesis.

=== Indo-Tibetan hypotheses ===
Since Hangul's invention, Korean scholars have hypothesized that Hangul is based on some Indo-Tibetan script. Pre-modern Koreans referred to multiple Indo-Tibetan scripts using a single term: pŏm (범; 梵). This can make it difficult to understand which script is being discussed in such sources. One of the earliest attestations to an Indo-Tibetan hypothesis is by Sŏng Hyŏn (1439–1504), who claimed Hangul was based on a pŏm script. Ledyard argues it was possible that he and others that described Hangul as such may have been attempting to smear the script by associating it with the Indic religion Buddhism, which was disliked by Confucianists of the time. Other attestations include Yi Sugwang in the 17th century, Hwang Yunsŏk in the 18th, and Yi Nŭnghwa in the 20th.

Western scholars have argued Indo-Tibetan hypotheses since the 19th century. In 1892, Albert Terrien de Lacouperie and Georg von der Gabelentz both made such arguments.

==== ʼPhags-pa hypotheses ====
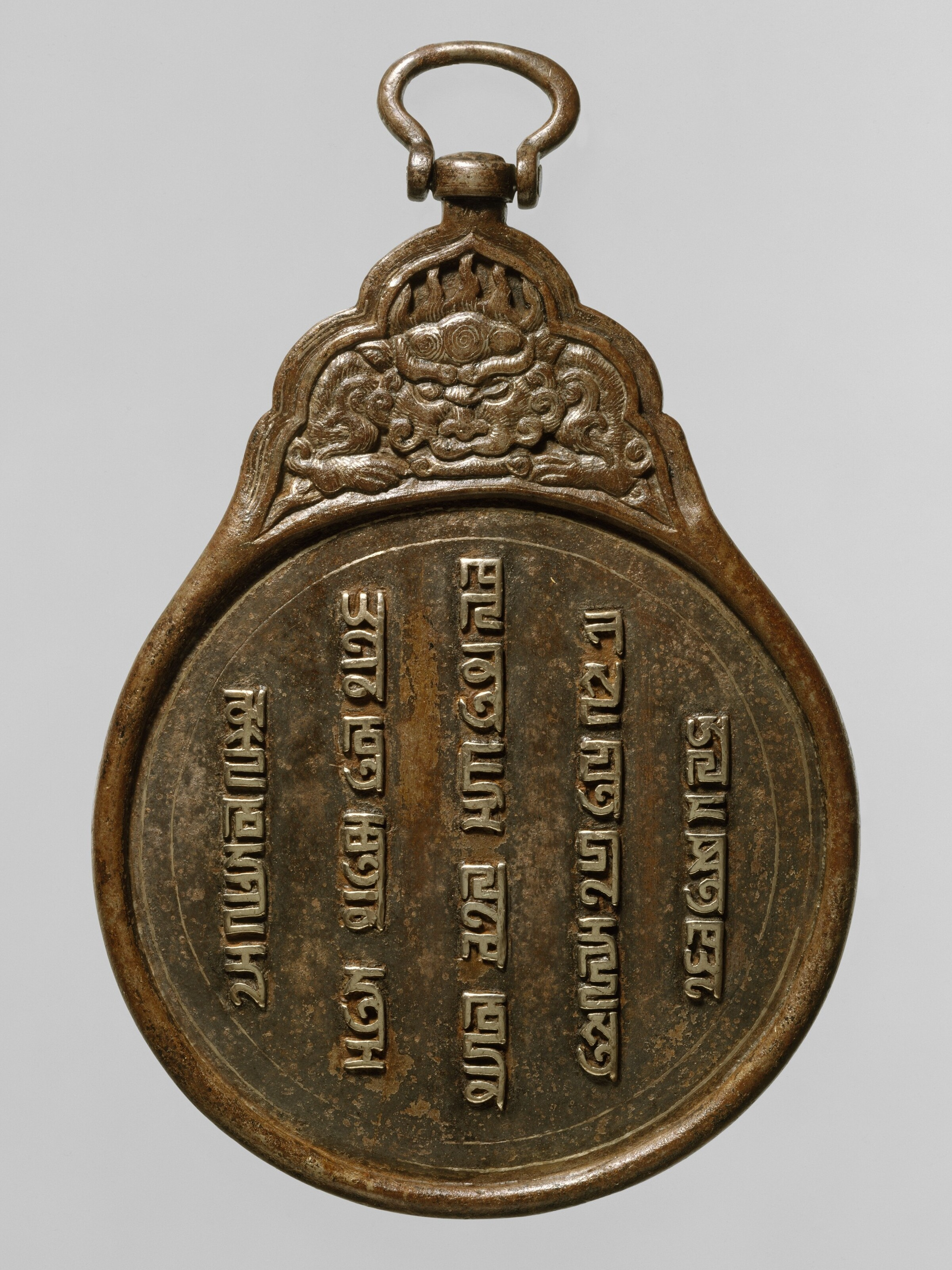
A ʼPhags-pa inscription (late 13th century)

ʼPhags-pa is a script designed in 1269 by a Tibetan Buddhist monk for use in the administration of the Mongol Empire. It saw use until the end of the Yuan dynasty (1271–1368), whereupon its use sharply declined. It was known to Korea; it was invented around the time that the Korean state Goryeo was under Mongol rule (1270–1356). Joseon still taught the script, although by 1423 its instruction was in decline.

Since the invention of Hangul, Joseon scholars had long hypothesized a link between Hangul and ʼPhags-pa, although Ledyard evaluated almost all of these hypotheses as similarly weak and surface-level.

In a 1957 paper, Canadian linguist E. R. Hope was the first to propose graphic correspondences between ʼPhags-pa and Hangul letters. He attempts to derive almost all Hangul consonant shapes from those of ʼPhags-pa.

In Ledyard's 1966 Ph.D. thesis (revised in 1998) and in a 1997 paper, he expands upon Hope's analysis. (Note: It is assumed in this article that the 1997 paper is more up-to-date with Ledyard's thinking. Both works largely align, although he reaches different conclusions on several jamo. Also, his 1966 thesis was only partially revised to desired standard before it was republished in 1998; the latter half containing the bulk of his argumentation on ʼPhags-pa reportedly received fewer revisions.) Ledyard derives fewer (ㄱㄷㄹㅅㅂ and possibly ㅈ (Note: In his Ph.D. thesis, Ledyard is doubtful of Hope's derivation of ㅁ, although he does not altogether rule it out. In his 1997 paper, he rules out ㅁ as too implausible.)). He argues that there is no need to rely on further derivations because they seem tenuous and also one only needs to derive a single fundamental jamo in each sound class. From there, one adds or removes lines to derive the other consonants. He also thoroughly examines the historiography and historical context behind Hangul's creation and ʼPhags-pa's connection to Korea.

Ledyard's derivations of fundamental Hangul jamo from ʼPhags-pa (Note: This table is largely based on Table 3 of Ledyard's 1997 paper. It also incorporates elements of Tables 1 and 2, and content from the body of the article.)
Consonant class (Note: Consonant classes and initial consonants come from the Chinese rhyme dictionary Qieyun zhizhang tu (切韻指掌圖), attributed to Sima Guang (1019–1086), which was the basis of Chinese phonological by Sejong's reign and likely informed the design of Hangul.)	ʼPhags-pa (Note: Classifications for these are derived from the Sino-Mongol rhyme dictionary Menggu Ziyun.)	ʼPhags-pa rom. (Note: Ledyard used ʼPhags-pa transcriptions from Clauson 1959, which he claims are standard among Mongolists.)	Hangul	Hangul rom. (Note: 15th-century Middle Korean pronunciations; romanization introduced in Ledyard's thesis.)	ʼPhags-pa → Hangul derivation
Molar	ꡂ	g	ㄱ	k	Remove the lower box.
Apical linguals	ꡊ	d	ㄷ	t	Straighten lines. (Note: The top line in both slightly extend left past the left vertical line.)
Semilinguals	ꡙ	l	ㄹ	l	Either trim vertical lines to the side or rotate clockwise and simplify.
Labials heavy	ꡎ	b	ㅂ	p	Rotate clockwise then simplify.
Apical incisors	ꡛ (Note: Ledyard claims to be less sure here. Hope suggests ꡅ corresponds with ㅈ and ꡛ with ㅅ, but Ledyard is doubtful of this. ꡅ is an upright incisor, while ㅈ is an apical incisor, meaning a jump across subclasses.)	x	ㅈ	c	Remove lines.
Apical incisors	ꡛ	x	ㅅ	s	Remove lines.
Notes:

These hypotheses, namely Ledyard's, have received a range of reactions from other scholars ever since. Some have expressed approval, others merely say they are possible, while others find them implausible.

==== Indian hypotheses ====
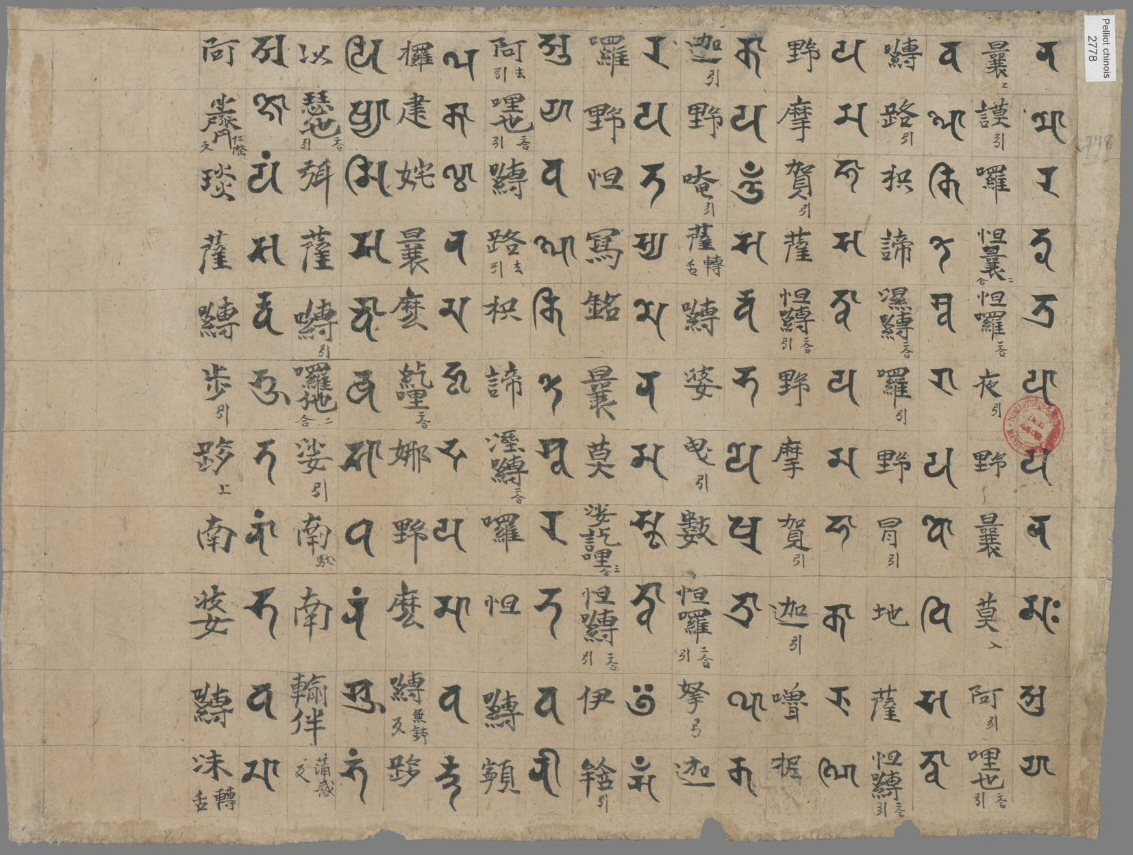
A dharani written in Siddhaṃ with Chinese transliteration

Ledyard argues that most Indian scripts—particularly the Devanagari, Brahmi, and Gupta scripts—were unlikely to have inspired Hangul. He claims past Western scholars have used Korea's connection to Buddhism to justify such hypothesized connections, but rebutted that there is little direct evidence of their use or appearance in Korea. One Indian script Sejong was personally familiar with the Siddhaṃ script; Siddhaṃ dharani had been placed on Sejong's throne and the ceiling of his throne room. However, that script was heavily stylized over centuries of Chinese calligraphic practice, and not widely used by Korean monks beyond dharani. In 1997, Ledyard wrote that "no one has ever suggested any connection between Siddham and the Korean alphabet, and there is none".

Scholars have attempted to compare the letters of Hangul to various Indian scripts. Ledyard showed some receptiveness to the comparisons of several Hangul jamo to letters of Devanagari and Gupta, but said "[t]he trouble is that one can only go so far with these comparisons", and that, to his knowledge, no such comparison had ever fully and rigorously linked Hangul to any such Indian script.

==== Tibetan script hypotheses ====
Several scholars have argued that Hangul was based on the Tibetan script. In 1820, French Sinologist Jean-Pierre Abel-Rémusat claimed Hangul was based on the choub form of the script. In 1892, American Koreanist Homer Hulbert argued in favor of Tibetan inspiration for some jamo, on the basis of some graphical similarity and mutual interest in Buddhism. Ledyard argues that Tibetan was implausible because he and Japanese linguist Shinpei Ogura did not know of attestations to significant knowledge of the script in Korea.

=== Chinese scripts hypotheses ===
A number of scholars have hypothesized that Hangul took some inspiration from Chinese characters. For example, several have hypothesized that the Hangul ㅁ took inspiration from the Chinese 口. Both are designed to resemble human mouths. The Hangul ㅅ has also been hypothesized to have been inspired by 齒, which uses four similar shapes to represent upper and lower teeth in the mouth.

==== Seal script hypotheses ====
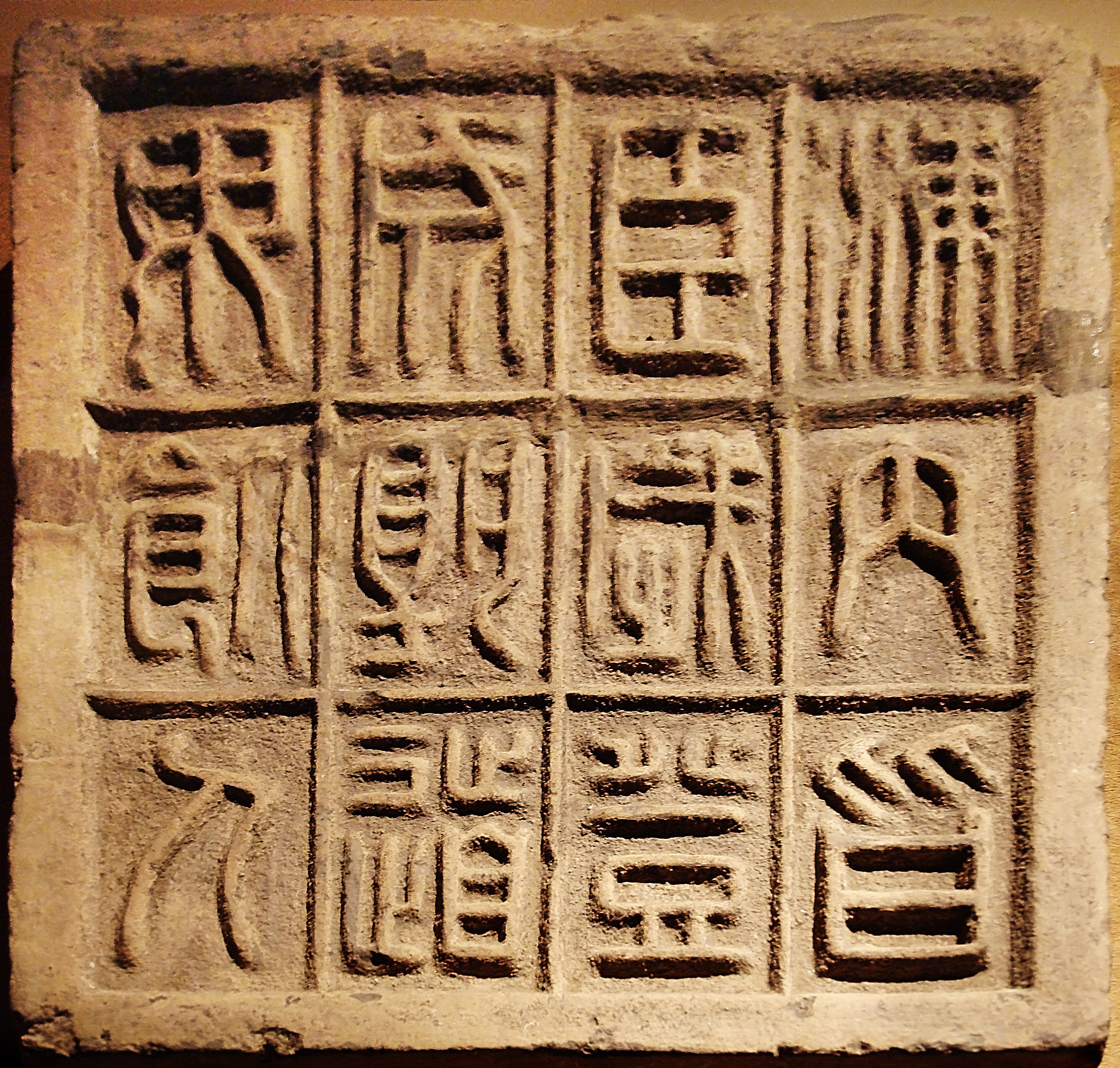
Seal script on a Qin-era (230–202 BC) stone slab

There are various hypotheses that attempt to link Hangul in varying ways to various styles of Chinese characters, namely seal script. Three pieces of documentary evidence are significant in such hypotheses:

1. "This month, His Highness personally created the twenty-eight letters of the Vernacular Script. Its letters imitate the Old Seal (古篆)..." (Note: 是月上親製諺文二十八字 其字倣古篆 分爲初中終 合之然後乃成字) (from the 1443 announcement of Hangul)
2. "Even supposing that the graphs of the Vernacular Script are all based on ancient characters (古字), and are not new characters, and even though the graphic forms imitate the ancient seal script (古之篆文), the combining of graphs according to sound is utterly opposed to the ancient ways; truly, there is nothing to base it upon..." (Note: 儻曰 諺文皆本古字 非新字也 則字形雖倣古之篆文 用音合字盡反於古 實無所據) (from Ch'oe Malli's 1444 rebuke of Hangul)
3. "The letters, while depicting outlines, imitate the Old Seal (古篆)..." (Note: 癸亥冬 我殿下創製二十八字 略揭例儀以示之名曰訓民正音 象形而字倣古篆因聲音協七調三氣之義 二氣之妙莫不該括) (from Chŏng Inji's 1446 postface to the Haerye)

The meanings of "Old Seal" and "ancient seal script" in each of the quotes above are disputed. To Ledyard's knowledge, these are the only known attestations to these terms being used in relation to Hangul. In 1966, Ledyard claimed that the predominant interpretation at that point was that the terms refer to Chinese seal script. Hope and Ledyard argue an alternate explanation of the above quotes to support the ʼPhags-pa hypothesis.

Scholars have debated seal script hypotheses for centuries. 18th-century Joseon scholar Yi Tŏngmu argued that some of Hangul's consonants were based, in sound and form, on seal script. In 1912, Canadian Koreanist James Scarth Gale evaluated arguments on how Hangul jamo could be systematically derived from seal script. He argued that while some jamo had patterns in relation to several Chinese characters, others did not. In 1957, South Korean scholar Lee Sang-baek (이상백; 李相佰) disputed Yi Tŏngmu's proposed sound connection between the scripts, while evaluating the form connection as possible.

Such hypotheses were dominant until the 1940 rediscovery of the Hunminjeongeum Haerye. They have since declined in popularity. Ledyard argued in 1997 that "the task of relating the simple and rigidly regular geometric lines of the original Korean script to the most elongated, tortuous, serpentine graphic style in the entire Chinese calligraphic repertoire is hopeless, and in fact it has been abandoned for some time".

=== Other scripts ===
The Jurchen script and language were known to a poor degree around the time of Hangul's creation. Limited courses on these were offered by the government. Ledyard dismissed the possibility of the script actively influencing Hangul. Ledyard wrote that the script "was more a code than a writing system", and that if it did influence Hangul, it was because it "discouraged Koreans from imitating it".

Japanese scripts, the Japanese language, and the Ryukyuan languages were known to some degree to Joseon around this time due to significant contact between these groups. Ledyard expressed skepticism of them influencing Hangul. Ledyard argues that they were unsuited to the phonology of Korean. If Korea had developed a Japanese-like syllabic script, it would have required thousands of graphs to write Korean unambiguously.

One hypothesis is that Hangul was inspired by the Koreanic script Kugyŏl, which are themselves derived from Chinese characters. Chin-Woo Kim claimed linguist Kim Wan-jin is the predominant advocate of this hypothesis. Kim Wan-jin reportedly argues that highly simplified characters from that script eventually inspired Hangul, similar to how the Japanese script katakana evolved from highly simplified Chinese characters.
