= ʼPhags-pa inspiration for Hangul hypothesis =

Hypothesis on the Korean alphabet

The Korean alphabet is known as Hangul internationally, Hangeul in South Korea, and Choson'gŭl in North Korea. There are a number of uncertainties about the origin of Hangul, especially how the shapes of its letters were conceived. Some scholars have argued that the ʼPhags-pa script of the Mongol Empire served as a minor inspiration for the shapes of several consonant letters of Hangul.

Several Korean scholars hypothesized that the ʼPhags-pa script inspired aspects of Hangul in the centuries after Hangul's 1446 promulgation. In 1957, Canadian linguist E. R. Hope became the first to explore possible graphic correspondences between the letters of ʼPhags-pa script and Hangul. American Koreanist and linguist Gari Ledyard submitted a Ph.D. thesis in 1966 (revised in 1998, additional explanatory paper published in 1997) in which he evaluated and expanded upon Hope's analysis.

Hope tries to derive the shapes of 10 Hangul letters from ʼPhags-pa letters. Ledyard argues some of these derivations are contrived; he instead tries to derive only 5 or 6 basic Hangul letters, some in a different manner to Hope. From there, he derives most of the other consonants by following a modified version of a stroke addition rule that allows for subtraction of strokes. That stroke addition rule was introduced in the text Hunminjeongeum Haerye, which introduced Hangul.

These hypotheses are less popular than the hypothesis that Hangul was largely an original invention. They have received a range of reactions from scholars. Some have expressed support for parts of or the entire hypotheses, some argue such hypotheses cannot be ruled out, and some argue they are implausible.

== Background ==
=== Origin of Hangul ===
Hangul was first revealed around late 1443 to early 1444 and officially published in 1446 via the text Hunminjeongeum and its companion commentary Hunminjeongeum Haerye.

The Haerye provides a number of explanations for the shapes of the letters. It classifies consonant sounds based on the Chinese linguistic system fanqie. The version of that system at the time prescribed 36 classes of sounds.

The 36 Chinese initials and their Korean transcriptions
Artic. Class		Wholly clear 全清	Partly clear 次清	Wholly muddy 全濁	Neither clear nor muddy 不清不濁	Wholly clear 全清	Wholly muddy 全濁
Molar 牙音		見 ㄱ	谿 ㅋ	羣 ㄲ	疑 ㆁ		
Linguals 舌音	Apical 舌頭音	端 ㄷ	透 ㅌ	定 ㄸ	泥 ㄴ		
Linguals 舌音	Raised 舌上音	知	徹	澄	娘		
Labials 脣音	Heavy 唇音輕	幫 ㅂ	滂 ㅍ	並 ㅃ	明 ㅁ		
Labials 脣音	Light 唇輕音	非 ㅸ	敷 ㆄ	奉 ㅹ	微 ㅱ		
Incisors 齒音	Apical 齒頭音	精 ㅈ (ᅎ (Note: These letters, while not introduced in the Hunminjeongeum or Haerye, were developed shortly afterwards and exclusively used to transcribe Chinese.))	清 ㅊ (ᅔ)	從 ㅉ (ᅏ)		心 ㅅ (ᄼ)	邪 ㅆ (ᄽ)
Incisors 齒音	Upright 正齒音	照 (ᅐ)	穿 (ᅕ)	牀 (ᅑ)		審 (ᄾ)	禪 (ᄿ)
Laryngeals 喉音		影 ㆆ	曉 ㅎ	匣 ㆅ	喩 ㅇ		
Semilinguals 半舌音					來 ㄹ		
Semiincisors 半齒音					日 ㅿ		
Notes:

The Haerye argues that the shapes of five basic consonants (ㄱ, ㄴ, ㅁ, ㅅ, and ㅇ) are based on those of the outlines of speech organs, as well as concepts in Chinese philosophy. Those five basic shapes are then used to derive most other consonants based on a principle of adding strokes. Related sounds that are considered "harsher" than the sounds of those 5 consonants receive additional strokes. In general, strokes are added to progress within a single sound class to a harsher articulation. For example, ㄱ ([k]) → ㅋ ([kʰ]); this is a move within the molar class from the articulations wholly clear to partly clear.

There are a number of consonants that do not neatly fit this pattern, however. ㆁ belongs to the molar class, yet has a stroke added from ㅇ of the laryngeal class. The characters ㄹ and ㅿ are derived from consonants (ㄴ and ㅅ respectively) of different subclasses.

=== ʼPhags-pa and Korea ===
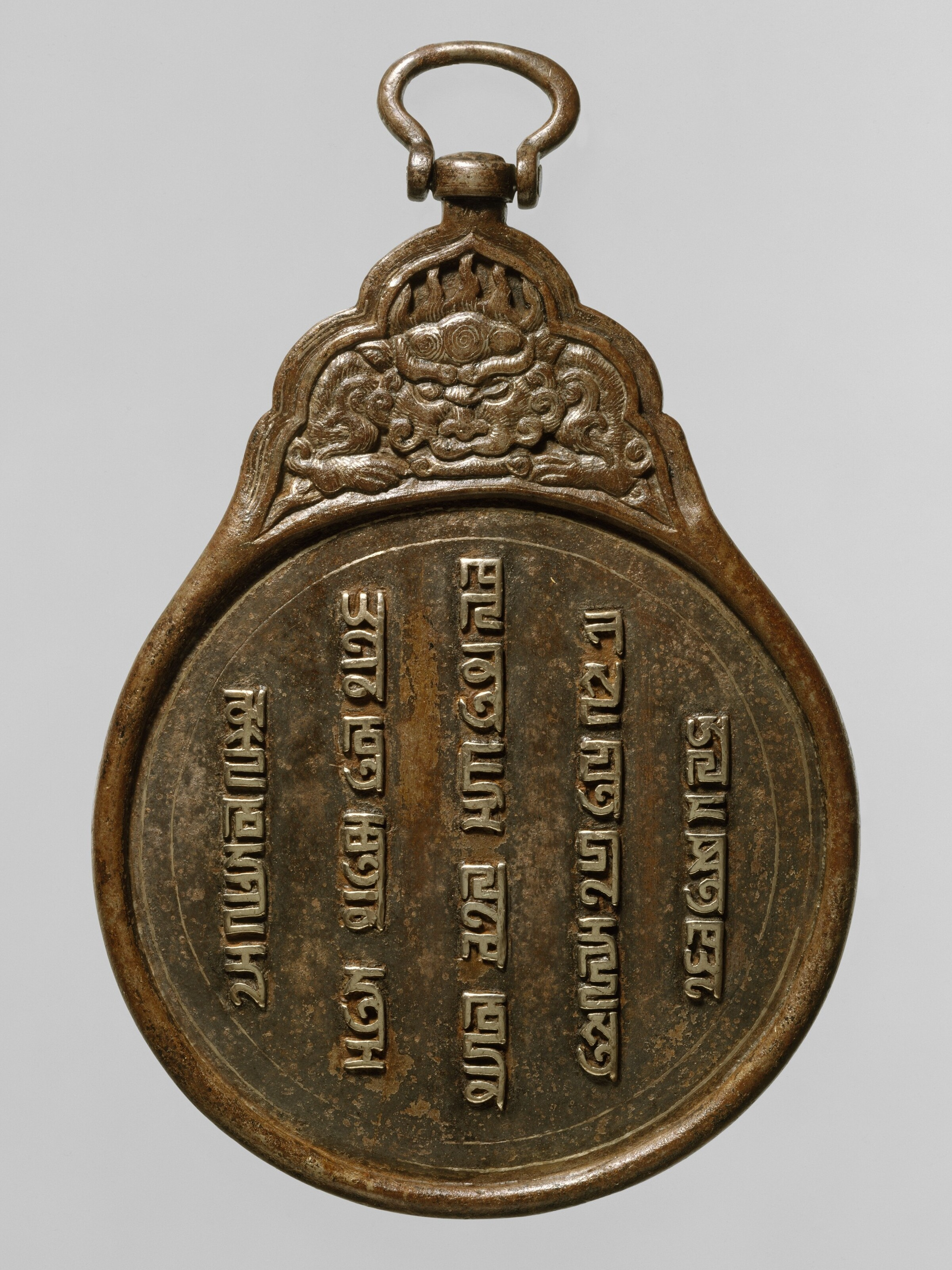
A ʼPhags-pa inscription (late 13th century)

ʼPhags-pa is a script designed in 1269 by a Tibetan Buddhist monk for use in the administration of the Mongol Empire. It was based mainly on the Tibetan script, with minor influence from the Umê script (also called "Tibetan headless"), and used to encode languages across that empire. It saw use until the end of the Yuan dynasty (1271–1368), whereupon its use sharply declined. It was known to Korea; it was invented around the time that the Korean state Goryeo was under Mongol rule (1270–1356). Goryeo received its first ʼPhags-pa communication in 1273 and quickly learned it from then. Goryeo received and accumulated edicts, seals, and documents in the script, which were likely transferred over to Joseon. Joseon still taught the script, although by 1423 its instruction was in decline. In 1469, a ʼPhags-pa textbook was listed as part of a government Mongolian curriculum.

== Early hypotheses ==
Since the invention of Hangul, Joseon scholars had long hypothesized a link between Hangul and ʼPhags-pa. One early hypothesis that Ledyard could identify was one by Yi Ik (1681–1763), although Yi did not provide much evidence for this conjecture and seemed to confuse ʼPhags-pa with the Mongolian script. (Note: Ledyard calls the script "Uighur", but based on his description of said script elsewhere, he appears to be describing the Mongolian script and not the Old Uyghur alphabet.) Over the following centuries, more Korean scholars made similar conjectures, although Ledyard evaluated almost all their arguments as similarly weak and surface-level. Ledyard evaluated one exception favorably: in 1918, historian Yi Nŭnghwa argued Sin Sukchu could speak Mongolian and that the phonetics of Hangul seemed to be derived from a Sino-Mongol rhyme dictionary. Ledyard argues that Westerners did not explore the link until the mid-20th century because ʼPhags-pa had not been well known to the West until then.

== 1957 Hope paper ==
In a 1957 paper, Canadian linguist E. R. Hope, following a suggestion from linguist Keith Whinnom, analyzes the hypothesized Hangul and ʼPhags-pa link. Hope primarily compares the morphology and phonology of letters between the scripts. According to Ledyard, Hope was the first to establish hypothesized graphic correspondence between the graphs of Hangul and ʼPhags-pa and the first to develop a serious competitor to the seal script hypotheses. In the paper, Hope limits his analysis to only the fundamental Hangul consonant jamo. Ledyard argues Hope likely knew that the other consonants are extensions of the fundamental ones, for example ㅋ being an extension of ㄱ. Hope also brings in two other scripts to extend his analysis: standard Tibetan and Tibetan headless. The latter script is a heavily altered variant that was used in northern China. Hope argues headless was a plausible connection, as both it and standard Tibetan were sources for the creation of ʼPhags-pa.

== Ledyard's hypothesis ==
In Ledyard's 1966 Ph.D. thesis (revised in 1998) and in a 1997 paper, he expands upon Hope's analysis. (Note: It is assumed in this article that the 1997 paper is more up-to-date with Ledyard's thinking. Both works largely align, although he reaches different conclusions on several jamo. Also, his 1966 thesis was only partially revised to desired standard before it was republished in 1998; the latter half containing the bulk of his argumentation on ʼPhags-pa reportedly received fewer revisions.) Ledyard writes in his thesis that his main argument is that Hangul is a combination of original work and multiple sources of inspiration, including Chinese phonological theory, the outlines of speech organs, and ʼPhags-pa. He insists that his hypothesis should not be interpreted as implying that Hangul was merely a derivative work of ʼPhags-pa alone.

Nothing would disturb me more, after this study is published, than to discover in a work on the history of writing a statement like the following: "According to recent investigations, the Korean alphabet was derived from the Mongol's ʼPhags-pa script."

— Gari Ledyard

Linguist Chong Che-mun, in a 2015 survey of research on ʼPhags-pa and its relation to Hangul, affirmed a claim that virtually no academics have argued that Hangul is significantly derivative of ʼPhags-pa.

While Hope had attempted to derive ten jamo from ʼPhags-pa, Ledyard derives fewer (ㄱㄷㄹㅅㅂ and possibly ㅈ (Note: In his Ph.D. thesis, Ledyard is doubtful of Hope's derivation of ㅁ, although he does not altogether rule it out. In his 1997 paper, he rules out ㅁ as too implausible.)). He argues that there is no need to rely on further derivations because they seem tenuous (Note: Ledyard criticizes a number of Hope's derivations. For example, Ledyard felt it was unnecessary to bring in headless; instead he proposes that several ʼPhags-pa graphs can be rotated to derive Hangul jamo. He also argues that Hope's derivation of ㅇ is implausible. Hope attempts to derive the modern version of ㅇ, which has dual function as null and ng in the syllablic final position. However, the separate jamo ㆁ was originally used for syllabic final positions and eventually merged into ㅇ.) and also one only needs to derive a single fundamental jamo in each sound class. From there, one adds or removes lines to derive the other consonants. Additionally, when matching ʼPhags-pa to jamo, he argues that both should come from the same sound classes (and ideally, subclasses as well).

Ledyard's derivations of fundamental Hangul jamo from ʼPhags-pa (Note: This table is largely based on Table 3 of Ledyard's 1997 paper. It also incorporates elements of Tables 1 and 2, and content from the body of the article.)
Consonant class (Note: Consonant classes and initial consonants come from the Chinese rhyme dictionary Qieyun zhizhang tu (切韻指掌圖), attributed to Sima Guang (1019–1086), which was the basis of Chinese phonological by Sejong's reign and likely informed the design of Hangul.)	ʼPhags-pa (Note: Classifications for these are derived from the Sino-Mongol rhyme dictionary Menggu Ziyun.)	ʼPhags-pa rom. (Note: Ledyard used ʼPhags-pa transcriptions from Clauson 1959, which he claims are standard among Mongolists.)	Hangul	Hangul rom. (Note: 15th-century Middle Korean pronunciations; romanization introduced in Ledyard's thesis.)	ʼPhags-pa → Hangul derivation
Molar	ꡂ	g	ㄱ	k	Remove the lower box.
Apical linguals	ꡊ	d	ㄷ	t	Straighten lines. (Note: The top line in both slightly extend left past the left vertical line.)
Semilinguals	ꡙ	l	ㄹ	l	Either trim vertical lines to the side or rotate clockwise and simplify.
Labials heavy	ꡎ	b	ㅂ	p	Rotate clockwise then simplify.
Apical incisors	ꡛ (Note: Ledyard claims to be less sure here. Hope suggests ꡅ corresponds with ㅈ and ꡛ with ㅅ, but Ledyard is doubtful of this. ꡅ is an upright incisor, while ㅈ is an apical incisor, meaning a jump across subclasses.)	x	ㅈ	c	Remove lines.
Apical incisors	ꡛ	x	ㅅ	s	Remove lines.
Notes:

The jamo derived above are all classified as wholly clear in fanqie. In addition to the above jamo, Ledyard believes that Sejong, without inspiration from any ʼPhags-pa graphs, chose to use a circle (ㅇ) as the basic shape for the laryngeal class. Unlike the other fundamental shapes supposed to derive from ʼPhags-pa, ㅇ is classified as "neither clear nor muddy". From there, the circle is modified to reflect other sounds, including the molar ㆁ, which is in a different sound class.

Ledyard's practice has some differences from that of the Haerye; that text begins with a slightly different set of jamo (ㅁ instead of Ledyard's ㅂ) and only calls for the addition, not removal, of lines. Ledyard defends these departures. He argues the line addition rule is poorly applied by the Haerye in the first place. There are several exceptions to the rule already given in that text, and lines are not added but in fact extended for the molars ㅁ → ㅂ → ㅍ. He argues that the line rule and even the stated derivations of the shapes as being inspired by outlines of speech organs and ancient Chinese symbolism seem post hoc, and that the correspondences he identifies go beyond coincidence.

Ledyard also thoroughly examines the historiography and historical context behind Hangul's creation and ʼPhags-pa's connection to Korea. He rules out many alternate hypothesized origins and provides evidence of knowledge of ʼPhags-pa in Sejong's court. On the "Old Seal" issue, Hope and Ledyard argue that the term may be a covert reference to ʼPhags-pa. That script had been used by the Mongols, who were regarded in China and Korea as barbarians; directly admitting inspiration from them could have prompted backlash. Ledyard describes this phrase as attempting to creatively place a Chinese "spin" on Hangul's origin. He also argues that there are attestations to "seal" being used to describe a style of Mongol script. In his 1997 paper, he argues there are attestations in Chinese literature of "古" being used to refer to Mongolia ("蒙古") and "篆" to ʼPhags-pa, although he concedes to not knowing of direct evidence that Sejong was directly aware of such literature. Ledyard also argues that ʼPhags-pa rhyme dictionaries and design either directly or indirectly influenced the design of Hangul. While there is no direct evidence of Sejong consulting such rhyme dictionaries, (Note: Despite this, Ledyard argues that Sejong possibly introduced such rhyme dictionaries to Sin, rather than the other way around, given Sejong's depth of knowledge in this area and breadth in others.) there is for Sin Sukchu. Sin relied on one such dictionary while producing the now-lost Sasŏng t'onggo. Also, Ledyard argues that Hangul organizes sounds and syllables in a way that more closely resembles ʼPhags-pa rhyme dictionary practice over Chinese.

In 1966, linguist Yu Chang-gyun also published a ʼPhags-pa hypothesis that Chong evaluates as having similar derivations to Ledyard's. Chong reasons that Yu's paper was published after Ledyard's thesis, and that the two had worked independently on the topic. Also, Chong claims that Yu did not consider only deriving basic characters then relying on the addition and removal of lines.

Linguist Sven Osterkamp evaluates Ledyard's hypothesis favorably and expands upon Ledyard's reasoning. He argues that the letter derivation principles in Hangul resemble similar such principles used for the creation of new letters in Tibetan and ʼPhags-pa. Osterkamp uses the example of pure dental and palatal-supradental sibilants (pure dentals are ᄼ, ᄽ, ᅎ, ᅏ, ᅔ, palatal-supradentals are ᄾ, ᄿ, ᅐ, ᅑ, ᅕ), where the palatal-supradentals are derived by mirroring the pure dentals. He argues that similar mirroring was also employed in ʼPhags-pa, and that Ledyard was seemingly unaware of this.

== Evaluations ==
Linguist Nicolas Tranter claims that ʼPhags-pa hypotheses have more traction outside of South Korea than inside. In a 2006 entry in the Encyclopedia of Language and Linguistics, Chin-Woo Kim evaluates Ledyard's ʼPhags-pa hypothesis as a "gaining theory", behind original invention hypotheses.

Linguist Peter T. Daniels wrote in support of Ledyard's hypothesis. He wrote that Ledyard's choice of "five [Hangul jamo] are almost certainly based on the corresponding ʼPhags-pa letters". Chin-Woo Kim argues the similarities between the two scripts are "a little too striking to relegate them to a simple accident".

Linguist Jae Jung Song evaluated a ʼPhags-pa influence on Hangul as "within the realm of possibilities". Tranter argues that ʼPhags-pa possibly had some influence on Hangul, but that Hangul is "in many ways a more original—and perhaps 'scientific'—script than ʼPhags-pa ever was". Linguist Richard Sproat argues that, while ʼPhags-pa influence cannot necessarily be ruled out, there is no direct evidence for it. He argues it may have offered some inspiration to Hangul, for example by illustrating that syllables could be broken down to further divisions than the two known to Chinese linguistics. Linguist Roger Finch finds the original invention hypothesis unconvincing and argues some ʼPhags-pa influence on Hangul is plausible, but feels that Hangul is sufficiently distinct from and superior to ʼPhags-pa.

Linguists Insup Taylor and M. Martin Taylor evaluate Ledyard's shape derivations as contrived and unlikely. They argue that a similar number of English letters, which are almost certainly unrelated to Hangul, resemble Hangul as well, and that "a more likely explanation is that with any two sets of simple shapes a few members of the sets will almost inevitably resemble each other". They do not rule out other possible influence from ʼPhags-pa: "[it is conceivable that Hangul's inventors] saw in [ʼPhags-pa] that it was feasible for simple and squarish geometric shapes to represent consonants." Linguist Sang-Oak Lee argued that the correspondences in ʼPhags-pa hypotheses are too few to seem systematic. Linguist Geoffrey Sampson expresses skepticism of significant ʼPhags-pa influence; he also describes the "Chinese spin" aspect of the hypothesis as "contrived". In a 1987 paper, Ross King claimed that, based on personal communication, neither of the Koreanists Edward Willett Wagner nor Samuel E. Martin supported the hypothesis. Linguist Young-Key Kim-Renaud argues Ledyard's derivations lack systemicity, and that Hangul letters are so simple they can be linked to many other clearly unrelated scripts.
