= Young-Key Kim-Renaud =

American linguist (born c. 1942)

- Occupation: Linguist

Academic background
- Education: Ewha Womans University (BA, 1963); University of California, Berkeley (MA); University of Hawaiʻi (Ph.D)

Academic work
- Institutions: George Washington University (retired)

Korean name
- Hangul: 김영기
- RR: Gim Yeonggi
- MR: Kim Yŏnggi

Young-Key Kim-Renaud (Korean: 김영기; born c. 1942) is an American linguist and Koreanist of South Korean origin. She is professor emeritus of Korean Language and Culture and International Affairs at George Washington University.

Her mother was author Han Moo-sook. She graduated from Kyunggi Girls' High School. She received a Bachelor of Arts in English from Ewha Womans University in 1963, a Master of Arts in linguistics from the University of California, Berkeley (Cal), a graduate degree in French as a Foreign Language from the University of Paris, Sorbonne, and a Ph.D. in linguistics from the University of Hawaiʻi. According to Kim-Renaud, while at Cal, she taught the first course on the Korean language in American history. She served as Assistant Program Director for Linguistics at the U.S. National Science Foundation. She began teaching at George Washington University (GW) in 1983; she would teach there until her retirement in 2015. She was chair of the East Asian Languages and Literatures Department for the last 12 years of her tenure.

She was the first female President of the International Circle of Korean Linguistics; she served in that role from 1990 to 1992, and was editor-in-chief of its journal, Korean Linguistics, from 2002 to 2014. In 2006, she received the Order of Cultural Merit, 4th grade from the South Korean government. In 2024, she and her husband donated US$100,000 to Ewha Womans University to establish a Kim-Renaud Humanities Research Award (김·르노 인문과학 연구상).

Her husband is French economist Bertrand Renaud, with whom she has a daughter.
