= Ahn Pyong-hi =

South Korean linguist (1933–2006)

- Born: January 11, 1933; Jinju, Korea, Empire of Japan
- Died: October 24, 2006 (aged 73); Seoul, South Korea
- Education: Seoul National University
- Occupation: Linguist

Korean name
- Hangul: 안병희
- Hanja: 安秉禧
- RR: An Byeonghui
- MR: An Pyŏnghŭi

Ahn Pyong-hi (Note: Spelling of his name from Studies in Hunminjeongeum) (Korean: 안병희; January 11, 1933 – October 24, 2006) was a South Korean linguist.

== Biography ==
Ahn was born on January 11, 1933 in Jinju, Korea, Empire of Japan. He graduated from the Department of Korean Language and Literature at Seoul National University (SNU). He worked as a professor at Konkuk University then at SNU beginning in 1968.

Ahn researched the historical linguistics of Korean, especially Hunminjeongeum. His master's thesis was on the grammar of 15th-century Korean.

He served as the president of the Linguistic Society of Korea and the Bibliography Society of Korea (한국서지학회) and was a member of the Cultural Heritage Committee (문화재위원). In 1991, he was a central figure in the establishment of the National Institute of Korean Language (NIKL) and served as its first director. He oversaw the beginnings of the compilation of the Standard Korean Language Dictionary. He also oversaw language reform and regulation efforts at the NIKL.

In 2002, he received the Sejong Cultural Prize. In 2004, he was a recipient of the 8th Dongsung Award.

He was married and had two sons and one daughter.

== Bibliography ==
He wrote around 10 books.

- 국어사 연구 (1992)
- 국어사 자료 연구 (1992)
- Studies in Hunminjeongeum (훈민정음연구; 2007), translated to English in 2018
