= Tongguk chŏngun =

1446 Korean dictionary of rhymes

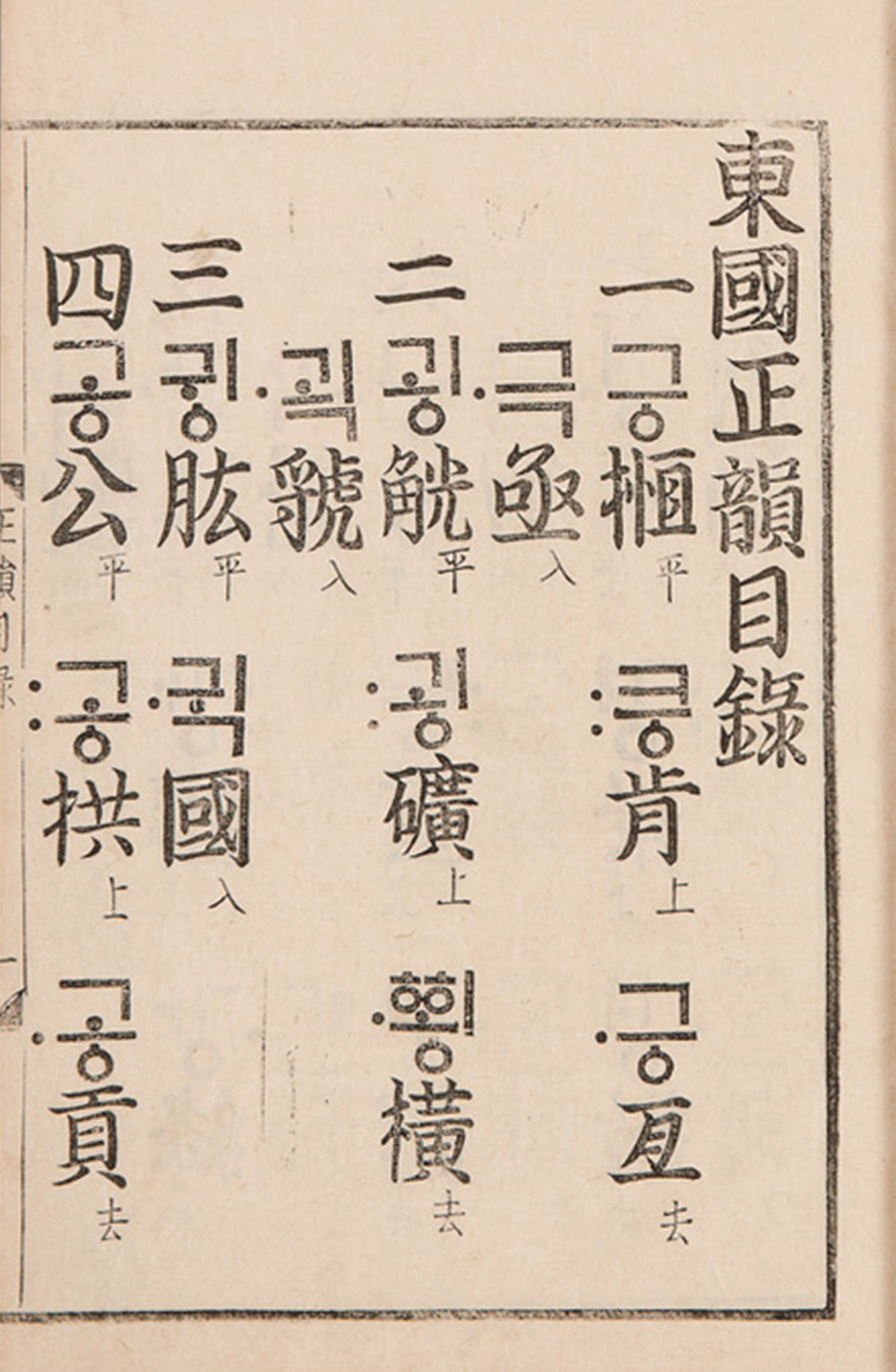
- A page from Tongguk chŏngun

Korean name
- Hangul: 동국정운
- Hanja: 東國正韻
- RR: Dongguk jeongun
- MR: Tongguk chŏngun

Tongguk chŏngun (Korean: 동국정운; Hanja: 東國正韻; lit. 'Standard Rhymes of the Eastern State') (Note: "Eastern State" is a literal translation of Tongguk, a sobriquet of Korea. See Names of Korea#Sobriquets of Korea.) is a rhyme dictionary that sets out standard phonetics for the Sino-Korean pronunciations of Chinese characters (Hanja). It was completed in September 1446 and compiled in 1447, being published, printed, and distributed the following year, under the instructions of Sejong the Great from the Joseon Dynasty, and serves as a companion volume to his Hunminjeongeum.

Tongguk chŏngun lists the correct pronunciations of Chinese characters for Korean as well as standardizing the sounds in the Korean language. It is the first book known to cover this topic, and the first book describing the reading of Chinese characters with the new Hangul alphabet.

Woodblocks were used for the larger characters, whose calligraphy is attributed to Prince Jinyang, and metal for the smaller text.

An extant original version of the book is held at the Museum of Konkuk University.
