= Chin-Woo Kim =

South Korean linguist (born 1936)

- Born: 22 March 1936 (age 90); Boeun, Korea, Empire of Japan
- Education: Yonsei University Washington State University
- Occupation: linguist
- Era: contemporary

Chin-Woo Kim (Korean: 김진우; Hanja: 金鎭宇; RR: Gim Jinu; born 22 March 1936) is a South Korean-born linguist and an emeritus professor of linguistics at the University of Illinois. He is recognized for his contribution to raising the international status of the Korean language through promoting Korean studies in the American education community. He published more than a hundred papers on Korean linguistics, general linguistics, phonetics, and phonology in domestic and foreign academic journals. He was listed in the directory of Who's Who in America (1982-) and Who's Who in the World (2004-), and was registered in 2000 Outstanding Intellectuals of the 21st Century (9th ed., International Biographical Centre, Cambridge, 2015). He received a Lifetime Achievement Award from the 2017 Marquis Who's Who.

== Personal life ==
Born in 1936 in Boeun, Chungcheongbuk-do, he studied under the nation's time of poverty and hardship. His father, Hyung-ki Kim (金炯基, 1905–1989), had a profound influence on his life and studies. He was a professor of Korean literature at Chungnam National University, was an early member of Joseoneohakhoe (조선어학회; 朝鮮語學會; the Korean Language Society) and contributed to the status of the Korean language as a member of the "Malmoi" (말모이) team. After receiving his B.A degree in English literature at Yonsei University (1958), he finished another B.A in literature from Washington State University (1962). Then he completed his master's and doctorate in linguistics at UCLA. Under the guidance of Peter Ladefoged, he wrote the thesis "The Linguistic Specification of Speech" in Phonetics (1966), and became the first Korean in the United States to receive a PhD in linguistics. He worked as a post-doctoral fellow in the Department of Linguistics at MIT (1966) and taught linguistics at the University of Illinois at Urbana-Champaign for 39 years (1967–2006). After that, he served as a chair professor of Korean literature at his alma mater in South Korea.

== Career ==
Chin-Woo Kim taught students as a professor in the Department of Linguistics at the University of Illinois from 1967 to 2006. In that period, he established a Korean language course at the university (1969). He served as the head of the Department of Linguistics (1979–86, 1999–2004) and the East Asian Language and Literature Department (1990–91). He was a visiting professor at the University of Hawaii-Manoa Department of Linguistics, Yonsei University, and Korea University, and an associate professor at the University of Tehran (Iran). He served as president of the International Circle of Korean Linguistics (1977–80) and the International Association for Humanistic Studies in Language (2000–08).

== Work ==
Kim's main research interests are phonetics and phonology. Academia indicates that his books and papers have been cited over 3,000 times so far. His representative writing is the publication of Language: the Theory and its Application (언어: 그 이론과 응용; 1985). He wrote this book at a time when there were no introductory textbooks for linguistics in South Korea and it since has been used as a university textbook. Several chapters were added to the supplementary editions, which is also a result of reflecting his thoughts on acknowledging the need for a more integrative and synthetic approach in linguistics study. The book provides an overview of the nature and origin of human language, phonetics, phonology, morphology, syntax, and semantics and it covers human language in relation with society, psychology, literature, brain, music, and computers. He compares language to life with observing language from its origin to its death rather than within its function as a tool only, and this shows his view of language that analyzes the language as an organism.

== Honors and awards ==
In recognition of his academic contributions and achievements, he received the KBS Overseas Korean of the Year Award in Humanities and Social Sciences (KBS 해외동포상; 2002), Dongsung Academic Award (2008), Yonsei University Yonmunin Award (연문인상; 延文人賞; 2008), and Oesol Award (외솔상; 2011) In 2015, he accepted the Cultural Minister Award in South Korea. In 2017, he received a Lifetime Achievement Award from Marquis Who's Who.

== Publications ==
=== Academic books and book contributions ===
- Kim, Chin-Woo. An outline of Phonetics (음성학개론). Hankookmunhwasa (한국문화사), 2020.
- Kim, Chin-Woo. "Globalization of Korean: transplant or implant?" Korea in the Global Community: Past, Present, and Future, edited by Eui Hang Shin. University of South Carolina, 1996, p. 191-205.
- Kang, Seok-Keun, and Chin-Woo Kim. "A Moraic Account of Consonant Cluster Simplification in Korean." Proceedings of the Second Annual Meeting of the Formal Linguistic Society of Mid-America, 1991.
- Kim, Chin-Woo. Language: the Theory and its Application (언어: 그 이론과 응용). Hankookmunhwasa (한국문화사), 1985.
- Kim, Chin-Woo. "Two phonological notes: A-sharp and B-flat." Contributions to Generative Phonology, edited by Michael Brame. University of Texas Press, 1971, p. 155–170.
- Kim, Chin-Woo. "Experimental phonetics." A Survey of Linguistic Science, edited by William Dingwall. University of Maryland Press, 1969.

=== Selected essays ===
- Kim, Chin-Woo. "On the globalization of English: Some internal factors." World Englishes, vol.38, no.1-2, 2019, p. 128-133. https://doi.org/10.1111/weng.12366
- Kim, Chin-Woo, and Hyoung-Youb Kim. "The character of Korean glides." Studies in the Linguistic Sciences, vol. 21, no. 2, 1991, p. 113-125.
- Kim, Chin-Woo. "Neutralization in Korean revisited." Studies in the Linguistic Sciences, vol. 9, no. 2, 1979, p. 147-155.
- Kim, Chin-Woo. "Linguistics and language policies in North Korea." Korean Studies, vol. 2, 1978, p. 159-175.
- Kim, Chin-Woo, and Seok-Chae Rhee. "Non-release and neutralization in Korean revisited." Harvard Studies in Korean Linguistics, vol. 7, 1977, p. 121–137.
- Kim, Chin-Woo. "Gravity in Korean phonology." Language Research, vol. 9, no. 2, 1973, p. 274–281.
- Kim, Chin-Woo. "A theory of aspiration." Phonetica, vol. 21, no. 2, 1970, p. 107-116.
- Kim, Chin-Woo. "Boundary phenomena in Korean." Papers in Linguistics, vol. 2, no. 1, 1970, p. 1-26.
- Kim, Chin-Woo. "The vowel system of Korean." Language, vol. 44, no. 3, 1968, p. 516-527.
- Kim, Chin-Woo. "On the autonomy of the tensity feature in stop classification (with special reference to Korean stops)." Word, vol. 21, 1965, p. 339-359.
