= Gari Ledyard =

American Koreanist (1932–2021)

Gari Keith Ledyard
- Born: 1932; Syracuse, New York, United States
- Died: October 29, 2021 (aged 88–89)

Academic background
- Education: University of California, Berkeley (BA, MA, PhD)
- Thesis: The Korean Language Reform of 1446: The Origin, Background, and Early History of the Korean Alphabet (1966)

Academic work
- Discipline: Korean studies
- Institutions: Columbia University (1966–2000)

Gari Keith Ledyard (1932 – October 29, 2021) was an American Koreanist who was Sejong Professor of Korean History Emeritus at Columbia University. He is best known for his work on the history of the Hangul alphabet.

== Biography ==
Gari Keith Ledyard was born in Syracuse, New York in 1932, while his family happened to be in Syracuse for work during the Depression. He grew up in Detroit and Ann Arbor, Michigan, and moved with his family to San Rafael, California, in 1948. After high school, he attended the University of Michigan and San Francisco State College, but did not do well, and in 1953 he joined the army to avoid the draft. Luckily, he missed so much basic training due to illness that he had to repeat it, and during that time opportunities opened up for language training, one of his interests.

Ledyard was scheduled for one year intensive Russian language training at the Army Language School in Monterey, but was soon reassigned to Korean. He graduated too high in his class to be sent to Korea, but after a few months was able to get a posting in Tokyo in July 1955, and then a transfer to Seoul in November. While there, he looked up the families of his Korean teachers, ate in town, and taught at the American Language Institute. When his superiors found out, he was accused of fraternization and reassigned to Tokyo, after only nine months in Korea, and returned to the US in December.

The next spring he enrolled in the University of California at Berkeley, in Chinese language and literature, studying under, among others, Peter Alexis Boodberg and Zhao Yuanren, as there was no Korean Studies program in the United States at the time. For his bachelor's degree in 1958 he translated the Hunmin Jeongeum Haerye into English; for his master's degree in 1963 he documented early Korean–Mongol diplomatic relations; and with a year for research in Seoul for his dissertation, he received his PhD in 1966 and a position at Columbia, at the Centre for Korean Research, succeeding William E. Skillend. He was made a full professor in 1977, and retired in 2001.

Ledyard's dissertation was The Korean Language Reform of 1446, on King Sejong's alphabet project, but concerned with the political implications and controversies of hangul as much as its creation. Unfortunately, he failed to copyright his dissertation, and it was distributed in microfilm and photocopy, so that he could not copyright it and publish without substantial revision. He was finally convinced to do so by the first director of the National Academy of the Korean Language, Ki-Moon Lee, and the book was published in Korea in 1998.

Ledyard also published on Korean cartography, the alliance between Korea and China during the first Japanese invasions, and the relationship between the wars of the Three Kingdoms and the founding of the Japanese state from Korea. He also wrote a book about the journal written by the 17th century Dutch explorer Hendrick Hamel who was held hostage in Korea for 13 years. The title of this book is 'The Dutch come to Korea' and was first published in 1971. He was invited to visit North Korea in 1988.

Ledyard died from complications of Alzheimer's disease at his home, on October 29, 2021, at the age of 89.

== Research on the origin of hangul ==
Ledyard believed, following, French orientalist, Jean-Pierre Abel-Rémusat in 1820, that the shapes of five basic Hangul consonants were inspired by the Mongolian Phagspa script of the Yuan dynasty, known as the 蒙古篆字 měnggǔ zhuānzì (Mongol seal script).

Only five letters were adopted from Phagspa, with most of the rest of the consonants created by featural derivation from these, as described in the account in the Hunmin Jeong-eum Haerye. However, which letters the basic consonants were differs between the two accounts. Whereas the Haerye implies that the graphically simplest letters ㄱㄴㅁㅅㅇ are basic, with others derived from them by the addition of strokes (though with ㆁㄹㅿ set apart), Ledyard believes the five phonologically simplest letters ㄱㄷㄹㅂㅈ, which were basic in Chinese phonology, were also basic to hangul, with strokes either added or subtracted to derive the other letters. It was these five core letters which were taken from the Phagspa script, and ultimately derive from the Tibetan letters ག ད ལ བ ས. Thus they may be cognate with Greek Γ Δ Λ Β and the letters C/G D L B of the Latin alphabet. (The history of the S sounds between Tibetan and Greek is more difficult to reconstruct.) A sixth basic letter, ㅇ, was an invention, as in the Haerye account.

Gari Ledyard stated for clarity that the link between hangul and ʼPhags-pa was limited, and that extrapolating a wider descendance of the former from the latter was not, in his mind, correct.

It should be clear to any reader that in the total picture, that ʼPhags-pa script's role was quite limited ... Nothing would disturb me more, after this study is published, than to discover in a work on the history of writing a statement like the following: "According to recent investigations, the Korean alphabet was derived from the Mongol's phags-pa script."

== Sources ==
- Ledyard, Gari K. The Korean Language Reform of 1446. Seoul: Shingu munhwasa, 1998.
- Ledyard, Gari. "The International Linguistic Background of the Correct Sounds for the Instruction of the People." In Young-Key Kim-Renaud, ed. The Korean Alphabet: Its History and Structure. Honolulu: University of Hawai'i Press, 1997.
- Andrew West. The Mĕnggŭ Zìyùn 蒙古字韻 "Mongolian Letters arranged by Rhyme"
