= International Circle of Korean Linguistics =

International scholarly organization

- Hangul: 국제한국언어학회
- Hanja: 國際韓國言語學會
- RR: Gukje Hanguk eoneohakhoe
- MR: Kukche Han'guk ŏnŏhakhoe

The International Circle of Korean Linguistics (Korean: 국제한국언어학회) is a scholarly organization dedicated to the promotion of awareness of, the dissemination of information about, and the facilitation of communication among those in the field of, Korean language and linguistics. It was founded on October 20, 1975. It publishes the journal Korean Linguistics.

The ICKL holds meetings in various locales across the globe every two years. Recent meetings:

2017 Helsinki, Finland
2015 Chicago, Illinois, USA
2012 Xuzhou, Jiangsu Province, China
2010 Ulaanbataar, Mongolia
2008 Ithaca, New York, USA
2006 Guadalajara, Mexico
2004 Çolakli, Turkey
2002 Oslo, Norway
2000 Prague, Czech Republic
1998 Honolulu, Hawai'i, USA
1996 Brisbane, Australia
1994 London, United Kingdom
1992 Washington, DC, USA
1990 Osaka, Japan
1988 Toronto, Canada

== See also ==
- Linguistics
