= Veritable Records of Sejong =

History books produced in 1454

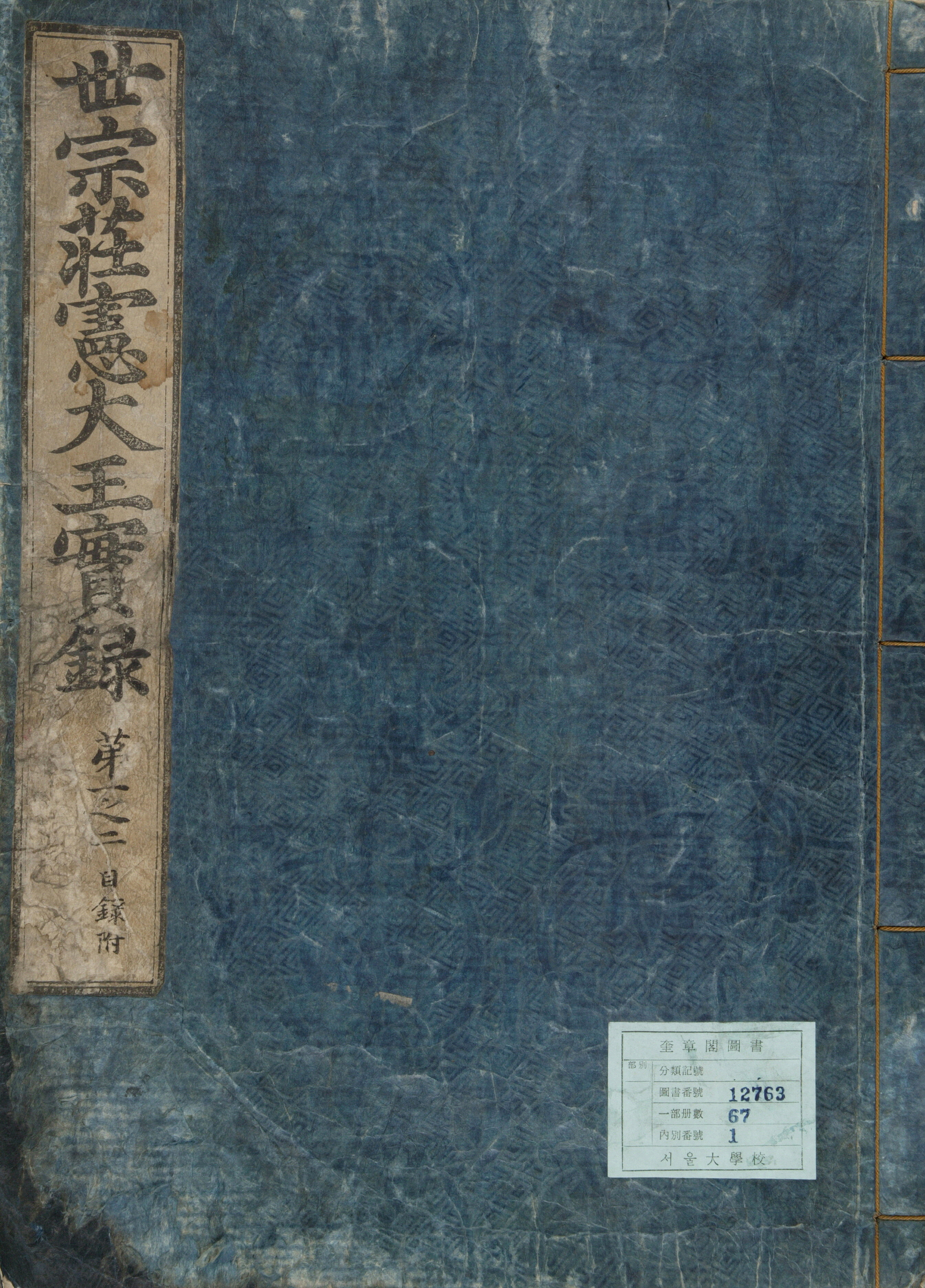
- Cover of the first volume
- Author: Office of Annals
- Language: Classical Chinese, Korean (Hangul, Hanja)
- No. of books: 163
- Preceded by: Veritable Records of Taejong
- Followed by: Veritable Records of Munjong

The Veritable Records of Sejong (Korean: 세종장헌대왕실록; Hanja: 世宗莊憲大王實錄) is a series of books completed in 1454 that document the reign of the fourth king of Joseon Sejong the Great (r. 1418–1450). Part of the Veritable Records of the Joseon Dynasty, it is the most significant source of information on Sejong's reign.

The books were compiled between the 22nd day, 2nd month of 1452 and the 30th day, 3rd month of 1454. Beginning in 1472, three more duplicate copies of it were made, to make sure it would not be lost. During the 1592–1598 Imjin War, all but one copy in Jeonju was destroyed. This copy was duplicated four more times from the 7th month of 1603 to the 3rd month of 1606. Some copies were destroyed over time thereafter.

Sejong's records are contained in 163 volumes (권; kwŏn) in 67 books (책; ch'aek) and consist of 11,172 pages, or around 349 pages for each year of his reign. His annals are the only one to contain a postscript; it includes numerous charts, pictures, and explanations of various innovations during his reign. Volumes 128 to 135 are on court rituals, volumes 136 to 147 are on music (136 and 137 contain the court music text Akpo), volumes 148 to 155 are on geography (the Sejong sillok chiriji), and volumes 156 to 163 are on astronomy and calendars.
