= EOR =

EOR could refer to:

- Earth orbit rendezvous, a proposed method for space missions to the Moon
- Electric orbit raising, a method in space technology of reaching higher orbits by means of electric propulsion
- Electro-optic rectification, a non-linear optical process
- Employer of record, a co-employment company
- Engineer of record, a licensed engineer responsible for the design and construction phases of a project
- Enhanced oil recovery, a term in petroleum production
- Epping Ongar Railway, a heritage railway in England
- European ordering rules, a standard to put words or names into sequence
- Exclusive or, the exclusive disjunction in logic
- Epoch of Reionization, a process that reionized matter in the universe.
- Economics of Religion, a field of study using economics to understand religion
- the IOC country code for the Refugee Olympic Team since the 2020 Olympics
- the character Eeyore from the Winnie the Pooh series.
