= Japanese postal mark =

Character representing the service mark of the postal operator in Japan

Japanese postal service mark

〒 (郵便記号, yūbin kigō) is the service mark of Japan Post and its successor, Japan Post Holdings, the postal operator in Japan. It is also used as a Japanese postal code mark since the introduction of the latter in 1968. Historically, it was used by the Ministry of Communications (逓信省, Teishin-shō), which operated the postal, telegraph and telephone service before it was ultimately split in 1952 to the Ministry of Posts and Telecommunications (which operated the postal service) and the Nippon Telegraph and Telephone Public Corporation. The mark is a stylized katakana syllable te (テ), from the word teishin (逓信, テイシン; "communications"). The mark was introduced on February 8, 1887 (Meiji 20).

== Usage ==
To indicate a postal code, the mark is written first, and the postal code is written after. For example, one area of Meguro, Tokyo, would have 〒153-0061 written on any mail, in order to direct mail to that location. This usage has resulted in the inclusion of the mark into the Japanese character sets for computers, and thus eventually their inclusion into Unicode, where it can also be found on the Japanese Post Office emoji. In most keyboard-based Japanese input systems, it can be created by typing "yuubin" and then doing a kanji conversion.

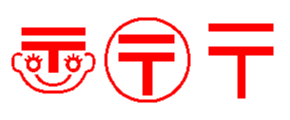
Several versions of the 〒 mark 〠〶〒

Of the versions shown, the one on the far left (〠) was the official mascot of Japan Post between 1966 and 1996, while the one on the far right (〒) is the standard mark used in addressing. A circled yūbin mark is often used on maps to denote post offices. Other variants have been used as conformity marks inherited from the Ministry of Communications: for example, a similar circled mark was used for electrical certification of Category B appliances, contrasted with a triangle-enclosed postal mark (⮗) for Category A appliances, under a precursor to the Act on Product Safety of Electrical Appliances and Materials. The Unicode code chart, as of version 13.0, labels the "Circled Postal Mark" character (〶, U+3036) as "symbol for type B electronics". An enclosed version incorporating a sawtooth wave shape is used as a conformity mark for Ministry of Internal Affairs and Communications regulations on radio and other electromagnetic wave equipment.

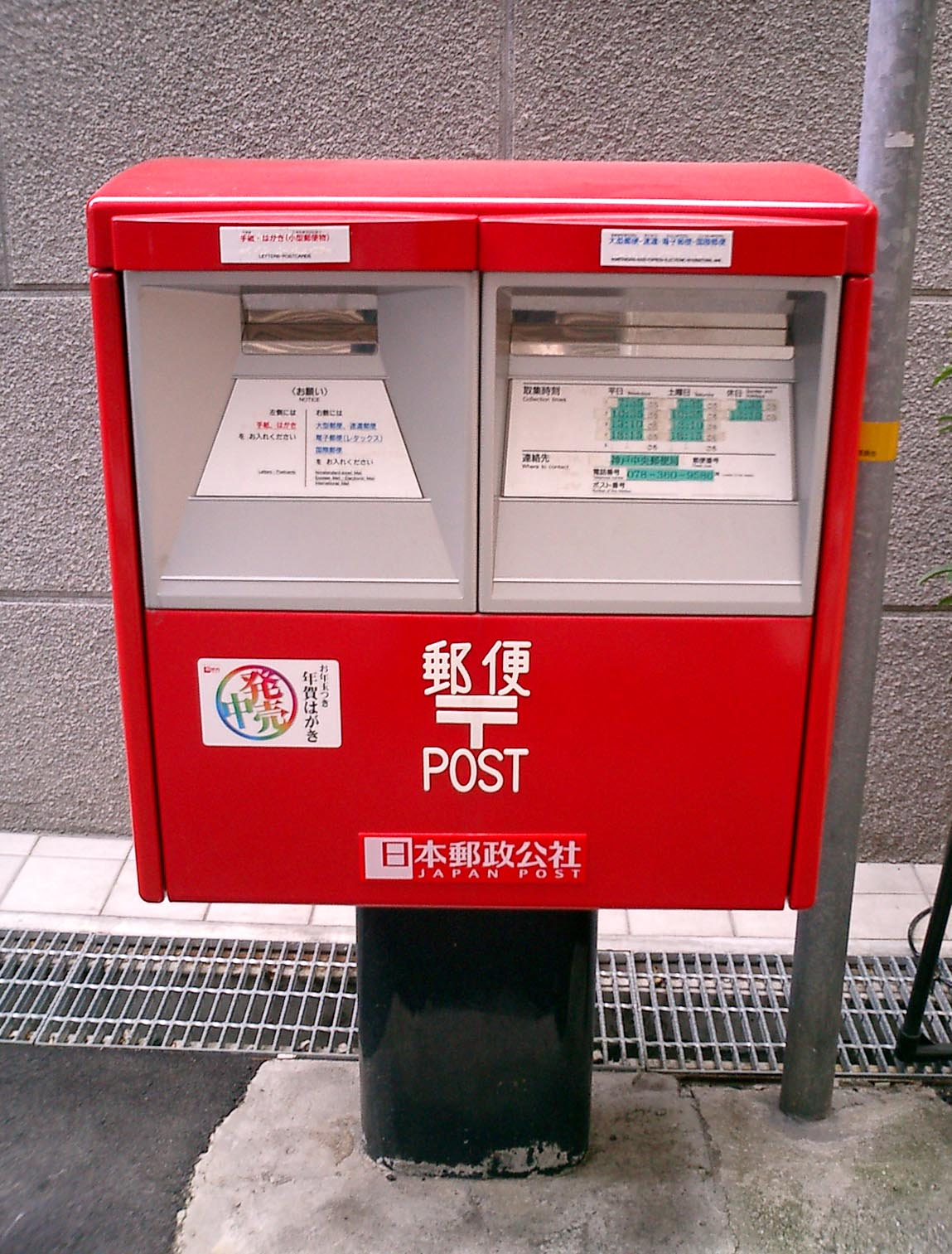
Postal mark marking on a postbox

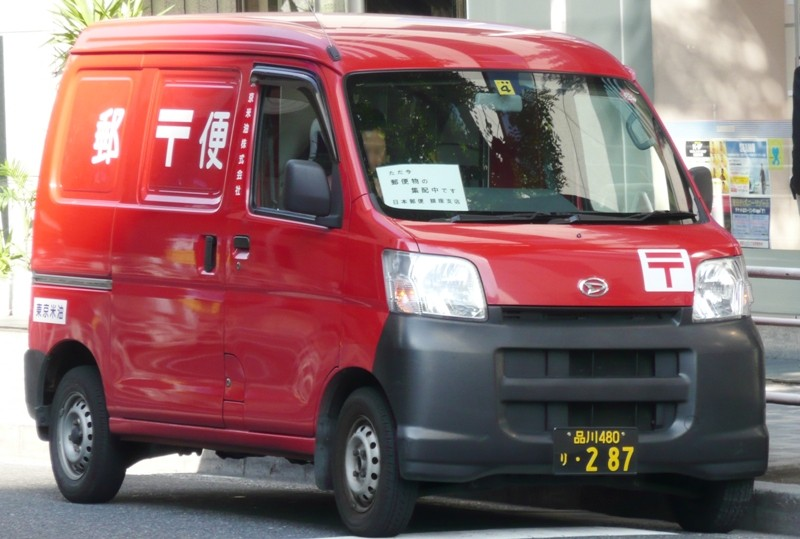
Postal mark marking a post van

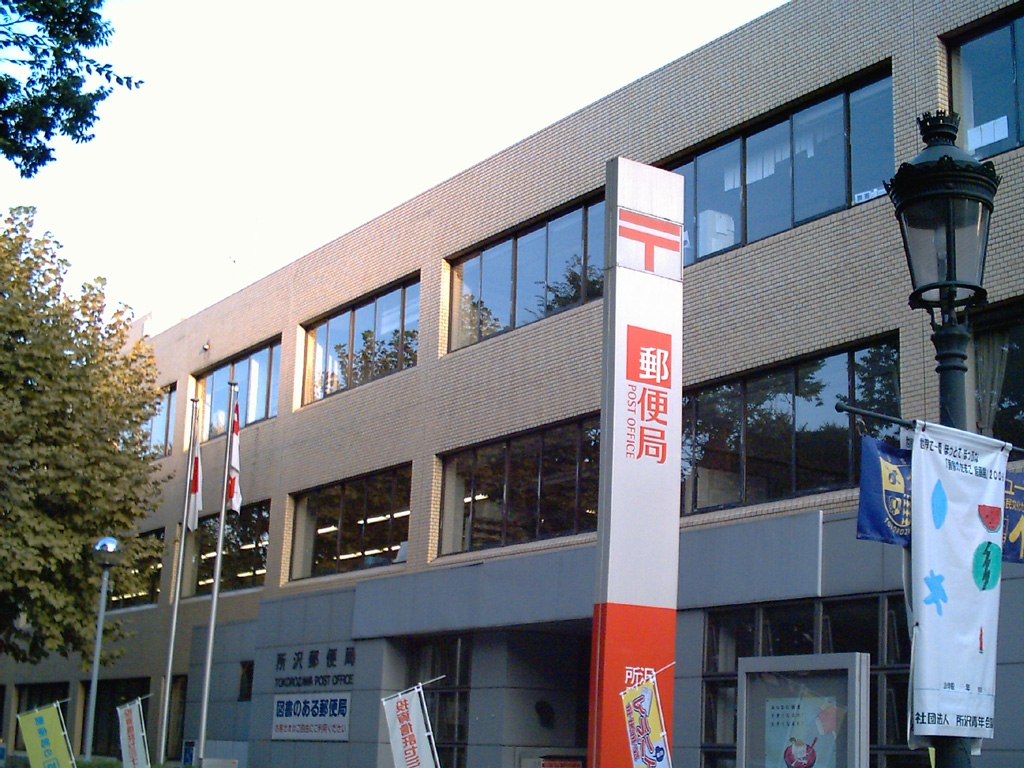
Postal mark marking a post office

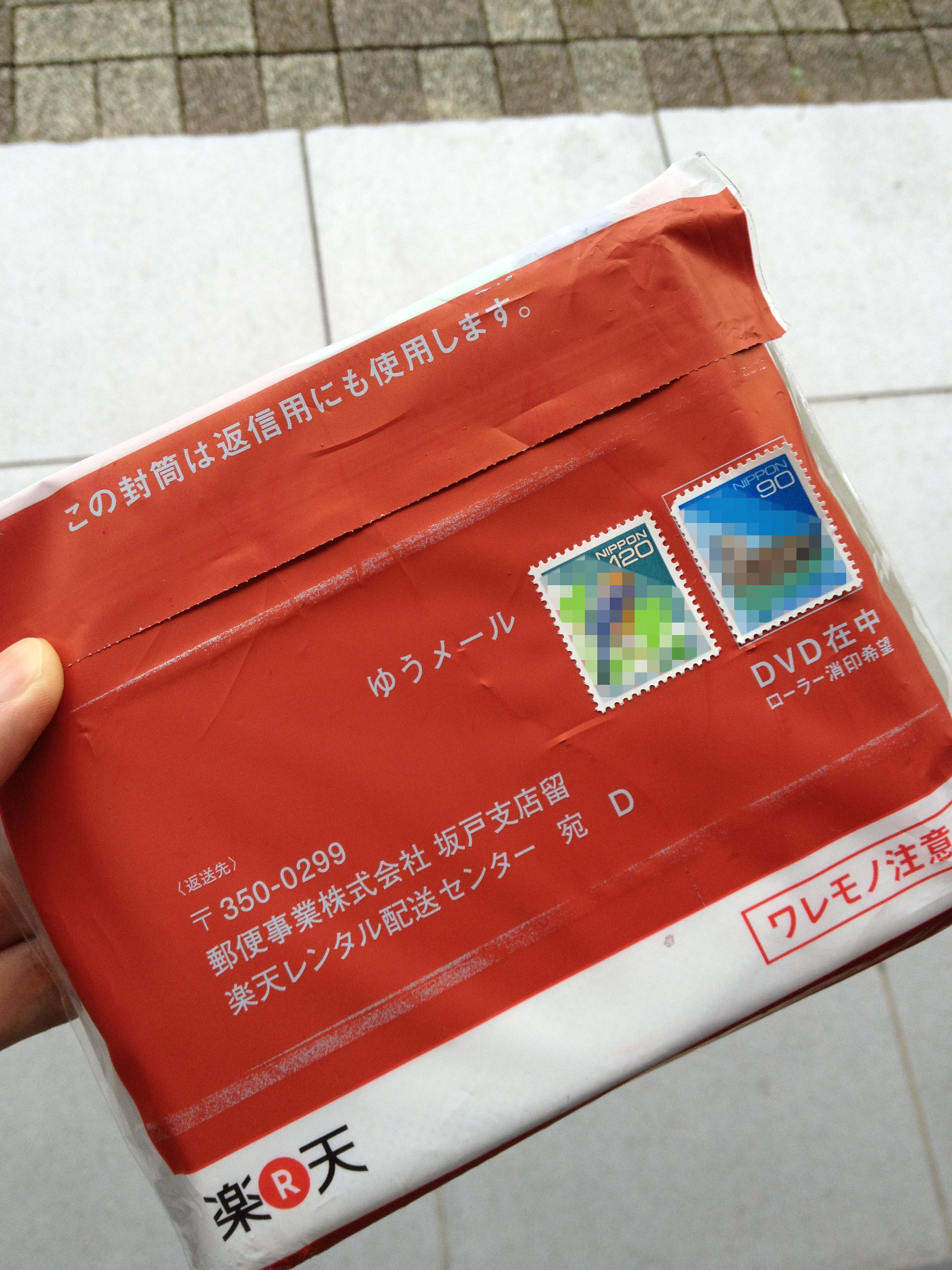
Postal mark denoting a postal code

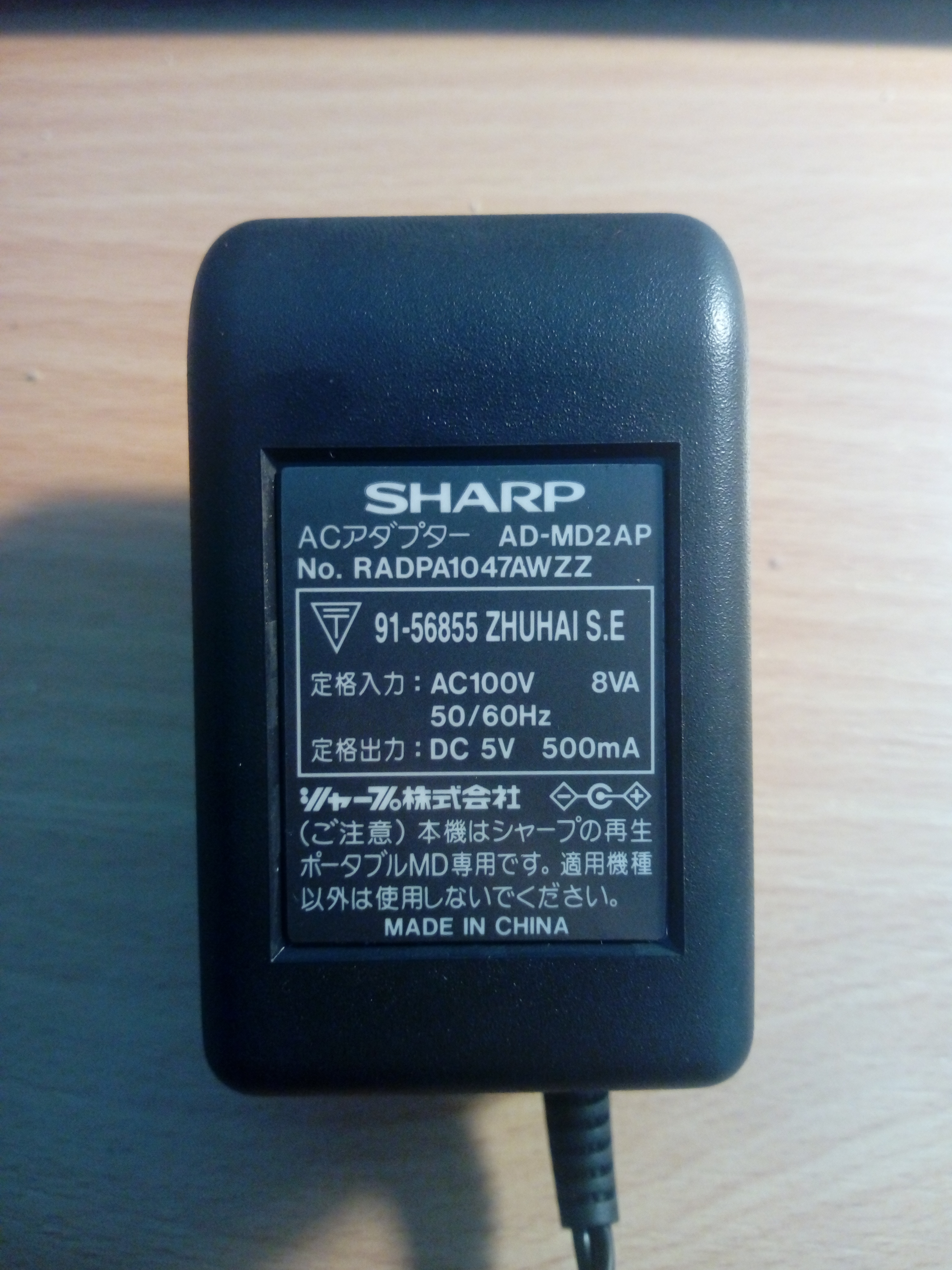
⮗ as a certification mark on an AC/DC adapter

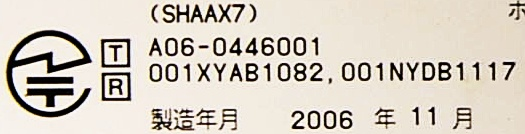
Certification mark for Bluetooth hardware

== Encoding ==
The postal mark appears in the following encoded characters. Before the introduction of Unicode, the simple postal mark was encoded for Japanese use in JIS X 0208 (including the Shift JIS encoding). A mascot-stylised postal mark face was additionally included in some vendor extensions of Shift JIS, including the KanjiTalk 7 variant of MacJapanese, and become part of a standardised Shift JIS variant (at a different location) with the 2000 publication of JIS X 0213.

The ARIB extensions for JIS X 0208, specified by the Japanese broadcasting standards ARIB STD-B24 and ARIB STD-B62, includes a duplicate of the simple mark for use as a map symbol for a post office, as well as a circled variant.

Earlier editions of the North Korean standard KPS 9566, such as the 1997 edition, included both the simple postal mark and a version in a downward-pointing triangle, which was proposed by the North Korean national body for addition to Unicode in 2001. In response to this proposal, the South Korean national body requested evidence for the symbol's use in North Korea, noting that the Japanese-style postal mark is not used in South Korea, which uses a circled 우 (i.e. ㉾) for a similar purpose. A report from a subsequent meeting between North and South Korean representatives from ISO/IEC JTC 1/SC 2/WG 2 notes that the North Korean body had decided to review the character before discussing it further, and it was subsequently removed from KPS 9566 in 2003, leaving only the simple mark. The version with an enclosing triangle was eventually added to Unicode in version 13.0, on the basis of established usage of both the circled and triangular versions in certification for electrical appliances in Japan, but also intended to correspond to the KPS 9566-97 character.

Emoji sets from Japanese cellular carriers included a building with a prominently displayed postal mark (in the simplest case, a postal mark enclosed within a building outline) as a pictograph for a post office; this was also adopted into Unicode in version 6.0. Although the most recent versions of Microsoft's Segoe UI Emoji also show a building, earlier versions from prior to Windows 10 Anniversary Update showed this emoji as a simple postal mark, appearing red in colour presentation.

Character information
Preview	〒		〠		⮗	
Unicode name	POSTAL MARK		POSTAL MARK FACE		SYMBOL FOR TYPE A ELECTRONICS	
Encodings	decimal	hex	dec	hex	dec	hex
Unicode	12306	U+3012	12320	U+3020	11159	U+2B97
UTF-8	227 128 146	E3 80 92	227 128 160	E3 80 A0	226 174 151	E2 AE 97
GB 18030	168 147	A8 93	129 57 164 51	81 39 A4 33	129 56 179 51	81 38 B3 33
Numeric character reference	&#12306;	&#x3012;	&#12320;	&#x3020;	&#11159;	&#x2B97;
7-bit JIS X 0208	34 41	22 29				
Shift JIS (Apple KanjiTalk 7)	129 167	81 A7	134 179	86 B3		
Shift JIS (JIS X 0213)	129 167	81 A7	131 228	83 E4		
EUC-JP (JIS X 0213)	162 169	A2 A9	166 230	A6 E6		
Big5	162 69	A2 45				
8-bit KPS 9566 (1997)	172 206	AC CE			172 207	AC CF

Character information
Preview	〶		🏣	
Unicode name	CIRCLED POSTAL MARK		JAPANESE POST OFFICE	
Encodings	decimal	hex	dec	hex
Unicode	12342	U+3036	127971	U+1F3E3
UTF-8	227 128 182	E3 80 B6	240 159 143 163	F0 9F 8F A3
UTF-16	12342	3036	55356 57315	D83C DFE3
GB 18030	129 57 165 54	81 39 A5 36	148 57 198 53	94 39 C6 35
Numeric character reference	&#12342;	&#x3036;	&#127971;	&#x1F3E3;
Extended 7-bit JIS (au by KDDI and others)			121 50	79 32
Shift JIS (au by KDDI)			243 81	F3 51
Shift JIS (NTT Docomo)			248 198	F8 C6
Shift JIS (SoftBank 3G)			247 148	F7 94
Shift JIS (ARIB)	239 78	EF 4E		
Emoji shortcode			:post_office:	

== See also ==
- Postage stamps and postal history of Japan § Postal symbol
- History of Japanese postal services
- Japanese addressing system
- Japanese typographic symbols
- Japanese map symbols
- Kazakhstani tenge (uses an almost identical symbol)
