= List of Japanese map symbols =

This is a list of symbols appearing on Japanese maps. These symbols are called chizukigou (地図記号) in the Japanese language. They are standardized by the Geospatial Information Authority of Japan (GSI) and the Association of Radio Industries and Businesses (ARIB). These two sources generally agree, but they have alternative forms for a few symbols.

Because these symbols were developed within a specifically Japanese cultural setting, alternative symbols have been developed for some meanings that are more consistent with worldwide symbol usage or more obvious in what they depict.

Symbol	Meaning (English)	Illustration
Municipal building (major city)	Municipal building (city or ward level)	Fukuoka City Hall
Municipal building (minor city, town, village)	Municipal building (town or village level)	Kota Town Office
Courthouse	Courthouse or building	Sapporo-High-District-Court
Fire station	Fire station	Nishi Fire Station Hiroshima City
Police station	Police station	Police station
Koban	Kōban (police box)	Kameariekimae-Kitaguchi Koban
Public health center	Public health center	Bunkyo Public Health Service Center Hongo branch office
Post office	Post office	Post office
Meteorological observatory	Meteorological observatory	Meteorological observatory
District Forestry Office	Forest service office	Akita Forest Service Office
Government building	Government office building	kinyucho
Elementary or junior high school	Elementary or junior highschool	Kota Junior High School gates
High school	High school	Kozakai high school
Junior college	Junior college	image searching
Technical college	Technical college	Tokyo Metropolitan College of Industrial Technology Shinagawa-Campus
University	College or university	Waseda University main campus
Museum	Museum	Tokyo National Museum in Ueno
Library	Library	Gifu Library
Shinto shrine	Shinto shrine	Fushimi Inari, Shinto shrine
Buddhist Temple	Temple	Daitoku-ji
Factory	Plant or factory	Hitachi Toyokawa Factory
Hospital	Hospital	Nagoya University Hospital
Japan Self-Defense Forces	Military (JSDF) base	Self-Defense Forces
Oil or Gas well	Oil or gas well	Oil well in Toyokawa, Akita
Power plant	Power station	Oi Thermal Power Station
nursing home	Nursing home	Kasugai Elderly Nursing Home
Japanese castle	Castle	Himeji Castle
Chimney	Chimney	Chimney in Hokkaido
Crater or Fumarole	Volcanic crater or Fumarole	Mount Aso
Radio tower	Radio tower	Radio tower
TV tower	TV tower	Tokyo Tower
Historical site-Place of scenic beauty-Natural monument-Protected animal plant	Place of historic, cultural, or scenic interest	Nintoku Tomb
Monument	Monument	Emperor Meiji Viewing the Fishing Monument in Oiso
Windmill	Wind turbine or farm	Wind turbines
Lighthouse	Lighthouse	Old style Japanese Lighthouse
Broadleaf trees	Hardwood forest or woods	Broadleaf trees
Coniferous trees	Coniferous forest or woods	Coniferous trees
Palm trees	Palm trees	Palm trees
Bamboo grove	Bamboo grove	Bamboo grove
Siberian Dwarf Pines	Dwarf pine forest or woods	Siberian Dwarf Pines
Field	Fields	Near Nakabaru Branch of Miyaki Town Hall
Paddy field	Paddies	Spring rice paddy
Orchard	Orchard	Sour Cherry Orchard
Tea plantation	Tea plantation	Tea plantation (Sri Lanka)
Mulberry field	Mulberry orchard	Mulberry orchard
Other Tree plantation	Other plantation	Other Tree plantation
Barren land	Marsh or Grassland	Barren land
Graveyard	Graveyard or cemetery	Graveyard
Mine	Mine	Mine
Pithead	Pit head	Ryugenji Mine Shaft
Quarry	Quarry	Quarry
Onsen	Onsen (hot spring)	Onsen
Important port	Major port	Kobe port
Local port	Minor port	Local port
Fishing port	Fishing port	Fishing port
Car Ferry	Ferry (car carrier)	Ritsurin Car Ferry
Other Ferry	Ferry	Non-car Ferry
Benchmark	Benchmark	benchmark
Fixed GPS marker	Fixed GPS survey point (Electronic triangulation point)	Fixed GPS marker
Triangulation point	Triangulation point	Triangulation point
Natural disaster monument	Natural disaster monument	Natural disaster monument

== Partial list of symbols for users with visual impairment ==
Official symbols according to the conventions of the Geographical Survey Institute of Japan appear with a circle below.

Symbol	GSI	Meaning	Unicode	Description
◬	○	Base triangulation surveying point	U+25EC	Dot in upward-pointing triangle
	○	Electronic triangulation point		Dot in upward-pointing triangle with flag
⊡	○	Benchmark	U+22A1	Dot in square
⛭	○	Factory	U+26ED	Gear without hub
⛯	○	Lighthouse	U+26EF	Map symbol for lighthouse
⛮	○	Power station	U+26EE	Gear with handles
文	○	Elementary or junior high school	U+6587	Kanji 文 (bun)
㉆	○	High school	U+3246	Kanji 文 (bun) in a circle
	○	University		Kanji 文 (bun) with a smaller kanji 大 (for daigaku) in brackets on top
	○	Technical college		Kanji 文 (bun) with a smaller kanji 専 (for senmon gakkō) in brackets on top
〶	○	Post office	U+3036	Down tack (T-shape) with overbar in circle
〒	×	Sub post office (not distribution centre)	U+3012	Down tack (T-shape) with overbar
⭙	○	Police station	U+2B59	Heavy circled saltire
☓	○	Kōban (police box)	U+2613	Diagonal cross (saltire)
⊕	○	Public health centre	U+2295	Greek cross in circle
⛨	○	Hospital		Greek cross in shield
⭖	○	Prefectural Office	U+26FB	Oval bullseye
⭗	○	City hall	U+2B57	Heavy circle with circle inside
◉	○	Ward office	U+25C9	Fisheye
⭘	○	Town hall	U+2B58	Heavy circle
⛩	○	Shinto shrine	U+26E9	Shinto shrine torii
卍	○	Buddhist temple	U+534D	Manji (swastika)
⛫	○	Castle	U+26EB	Castle
⛼	○	Cemetery	U+26FC	Headstone graveyard symbol
♨	○	Onsen (hot springs)	U+2668	Oval with three vertical wavy lines
⛬	○	Historical landmark	U+26EC	Historic site
⛰	○	Summit	U+26F0	Mountain

== See also ==
- Key (map) – Graphic depiction of a geographic phenomenon
- List of Japanese typographic symbols
- Geospatial Information Authority of Japan – Institution responsible for surveying and mapping the national land of Japan (GSI)
