= Unicode collation algorithm =

String collation algorithm

The Unicode collation algorithm (UCA) is an algorithm defined in Unicode Technical Report #10, which is a customizable method to produce binary keys from strings representing text in any writing system and language that can be represented with Unicode. These keys can then be efficiently compared byte by byte in order to collate or sort them according to the rules of the language, with options for ignoring case, accents, etc.

The UCA requires canonically equivalent character sequences to sort identically and specifies that input strings be normalized to Normalization Form D (NFD) before collation.

Unicode Technical Report #10 also specifies the Default Unicode Collation Element Table (DUCET). This data file specifies a default collation ordering. The DUCET is customizable for different languages, and some such customizations can be found in the Unicode Common Locale Data Repository (CLDR).

An open source implementation of UCA is included with the International Components for Unicode, ICU. ICU supports tailoring, and the collation tailorings from CLDR are included in ICU.

== See also ==
- Collation
- ISO/IEC 14651
- European ordering rules (EOR)
- Common Locale Data Repository (CLDR)
