= ISO/IEC 14651 =

String comparison algorithm standard

ISO/IEC 14651:2016, Information technology -- International string ordering and comparison -- Method for comparing character strings and description of the common template tailorable ordering, is an International Organization for Standardization (ISO)/International Electrotechnical Commission (IEC) standard specifying an algorithm that can be used when comparing two strings. This comparison can be used when collating a set of strings. The standard also specifies a data file, the Common Tailorable Template (CTT), which outlines the comparison order. This order is meant to be tailored for different languages, making the CTT a template rather than a default. In many cases, however, the empty tailoring—where no weightings are changed—is appropriate, as different languages have incompatible ordering requirements. One such tailoring is European ordering rules (EOR), which in turn is supposed to be tailored for different European languages.

The Common Tailorable Template (CTT) data file of this ISO/IEC standard is aligned with the Default Unicode Collation Entity Table (DUCET) datafile of the Unicode collation algorithm (UCA) specified in Unicode Technical Standard #10.

This is the fourth edition of the standard and was published on 2016-02-15, corrected on 2016-05-01 and covers up to and including Unicode 8.0. One additional amendment Amd.1:2017 was published in September 2017 and covers up to and including Unicode 9.0.

== See also ==
- Collation – Assembly of written information into a standard order
- European ordering rules – Puts words into standard sequence
- ISO/IEC JTC 1/SC 2 – Subcommittee for coded character sets
- Unicode – Character encoding standard

== External links and references ==
- ISO site, "ISO/IEC 14651:2016". ISO/IEC 14651:2016 and Amd.1:2017 are freely available from the ISO website
- "What are the differences between the UCA and ISO 14651?"
