= Act on Product Safety of Electrical Appliances and Materials =

Law governing electrical appliance safety in Japan

PSE Symbol

The PSE law (PSE法, PSE hō) is the law that governs electrical appliance safety in Japan. PSE stands for Product Safety Electrical Appliance & Material. The formal name is Denki Yōhin Anzenhō (電気用品安全法). The most recent revision comes April 1, 2001. The PSE symbol can be found on appliances that are approved for use in Japan.

DENAN is a mandatory national law administered by Japan's Ministry of Economy, Trade and Industry (METI), which was formerly called the Electrical Appliance and Material Control Law (“DENTORI”). For electrical appliances such as DC Power Supplies exported to Japan, the DENAN “DENAN symbol” approval is required.

AC/DC power supplies are considered a "Category A" product with means they are specified products and require a diamond PSE Mark for use in Japan. These specified electrical appliances are either required to undergo third-party conformity assessment, and obtain their certificate, or obtain “the equivalent of a certificate” through the manufacturers of the specified electrical appliances concerned. The Notifying Supplier (importer) is responsible for ensuring that the product is tested in accordance with the requirements by a RCAB (or “Registered Conformity Assessment Body”).

PSE rated power supplies are characterized by classes and ratings ranges rather than specific model numbers.

== See also ==
- CE marking
