= Hangul (disambiguation) =

Hangul is the Korean alphabet.

Hangul may also refer to:

- Korean language

== Computing ==
- Hangul (word processor)
- Hangul (obsolete Unicode block), in use 1991–1996

== Other uses ==
- Kashmir stag, a deer subspecies
- The Hangul, a fictional car in the 2008 film Speed Racer
