= KS X 1002 =

South Korean supplementary character set

- Alias(es): KS C 5657
- Language: Intended to be used alongside KS X 1001 for Korean support. Does not substantially support any language on its own.
- Standard: KS X 1002
- Current status: Unihan source. Not usually encoded directly.
- Classification: Supplementary charset; ISO 2022; DBCS; CJK encoding
- Encoding formats: Theoretically ISO 2022, but has no ISO-IR registration (and thus no standardised escape sequence) and is not included in any EUC code.
- Other related encoding: Intended to supplement: KS X 1001 Other supplementary ISO 2022 CJK DBCSes: JIS X 0212

KS X 1002 (formerly KS C 5657) is a South Korean character set standard established in order to supplement KS X 1001. It consists of a total of 7,649 characters.

Unlike KS X 1001, KS X 1002 is not encoded in any legacy encoding. Even in 1994, it was known as "a standard that no one implemented".

== Characters ==
Characters in KS X 1002 are arranged in a 94×94 grid (as in ISO/IEC 2022), and the two-byte code point of each character is expressed in the haeng-yeol form, which specifies a row (haeng 행) and the position of the character within the row (cell, yeol 열).

The rows (numbered from 1 to 94) contain characters as follows:

- 01–07: Latin letters with diacritics (613 characters)
- 08–10: Greek letters with diacritics (273 characters)
- 11–13: miscellaneous symbols (275 characters)
- 14: compound jamo and Hangul syllables without an initial consonant (27 characters)
- 16–36: modern Hangul syllables (1,930 characters)
- 37–54: archaic Hangul syllables (1,675 characters)
- 55–85: Hanja (2,856 characters)

The rows 15 and 86–94 are unassigned.

== Impact on Unicode ==
KS X 1002 is one of the sources of the CJK Unified Ideographs block in Unicode.

In Unicode 1.1, the characters at U+3D2E–U+44B7 were from rows 16–36 of KS X 1002. However, they were deleted and superseded by the new Hangul Syllables block (U+AC00–U+D7AF) in Unicode 2.0.

== Precomposed modern Hangul set (rows number 16 through 36) ==
KS X 1002 (precomposed modern Hangul syllables)
	0	1	2	3	4	5	6	7	8	9	A	B	C	D	E	F
302x/B0Ax		갂 AC02	갋 AC0B	갌 AC0C	갢 AC22	갣 AC23	갲 AC32	갵 AC35	갶 AC36	갿 AC3F	걁 AC41	걇 AC47	걈 AC48	걉 AC49	걌 AC4C	걤 AC64
303x/B0Bx	걥 AC65	걳 AC73	걵 AC75	걹 AC79	겇 AC87	겍 AC8D	겓 AC93	겥 ACA5	겧 ACA7	겱 ACB1	겴 ACB4	겷 ACB7	겾 ACBE	겿 ACBF	곂 ACC2	곅 ACC5
304x/B0Cx	곋 ACCB	곔 ACD4	곘 ACD8	곙 ACD9	곩 ACE9	곫 ACEB	곮 ACEE	곷 ACF7	곹 ACF9	곺 ACFA	곻 ACFB	괃 AD03	괐 AD10	괙 AD19	괟 AD1F	괢 AD22
305x/B0Dx	괨 AD28	괫 AD2B	괻 AD3B	괾 AD3E	굈 AD48	굑 AD51	굗 AD57	굠 AD60	굥 AD65	굸 AD78	궃 AD83	궆 AD86	궏 AD8F	궙 AD99	궛 AD9B	궥 ADA5
306x/B0Ex	궨 ADA8	궫 ADAB	궬 ADAC	궴 ADB4	궵 ADB5	궸 ADB8	궹 ADB9	귇 ADC7	귊 ADCA	귔 ADD4	귕 ADD5	귝 ADDD	귨 ADE8	귬 ADEC	귭 ADED	귯 ADEF
307x/B0Fx	귱 ADF1	귾 ADFE	긂 AE02	긃 AE03	긄 AE04	긇 AE07	긎 AE0E	긏 AE0F	긑 AE11	긒 AE12	긓 AE13	긕 AE15	긘 AE18	긜 AE1C	긠 AE20	
312x/B1Ax		긤 AE24	긥 AE25	긧 AE27	긩 AE29	긹 AE39	긼 AE3C	깄 AE44	깇 AE47	깉 AE49	깋 AE4B	깓 AE53	깢 AE62	깣 AE63	깪 AE6A	깯 AE6F
313x/B1Bx	깳 AE73	깶 AE76	꺁 AE81	꺈 AE88	꺋 AE8B	꺍 AE8D	꺗 AE97	꺙 AE99	꺠 AEA0	꺵 AEB5	껂 AEC2	껃 AEC3	껒 AED2	껓 AED3	껕 AED5	껚 AEDA
314x/B1Cx	껟 AEDF	껠 AEE0	껩 AEE9	껬 AEEC	껱 AEF1	껵 AEF5	껻 AEFB	꼄 AF04	꼅 AF05	꼉 AF09	꼗 AF17	꼥 AF25	꼳 AF33	꼶 AF36	꼸 AF38	꼻 AF3B
315x/B1Dx	꽅 AF45	꽇 AF47	꽌 AF4C	꽏 AF4F	꽘 AF58	꽙 AF59	꽛 AF5B	꽨 AF68	꽫 AF6B	꽬 AF6C	꽴 AF74	꽵 AF75	꽸 AF78	꾁 AF81	꾇 AF87	꾓 AF93
316x/B1Ex	꾔 AF94	꾠 AFA0	꾣 AFA3	꾤 AFA4	꾬 AFAC	꾭 AFAD	꾲 AFB2	꾿 AFBF	꿁 AFC1	꿏 AFCF	꿕 AFD5	꿘 AFD8	꿛 AFDB	꿤 AFE4	꿧 AFE7	꿷 AFF7
317x/B1Fx	뀃 B003	뀅 B005	뀍 B00D	뀓 B013	뀟 B01F	뀡 B021	뀬 B02C	뀰 B030	뀸 B038	뀹 B039	끋 B04B	끍 B04D	끛 B05B	끟 B05F	끠 B060	
322x/B2Ax		끡 B061	끧 B067	끨 B068	끫 B06B	끳 B073	끵 B075	낃 B083	낋 B08B	낐 B090	낕 B095	낛 B09B	낤 B0A4	낪 B0AA	낰 B0B0	낲 B0B2
323x/B2Bx	낻 B0BB	냎 B0CE	냗 B0D7	냡 B0E1	냣 B0E3	냦 B0E6	냩 B0E9	냬 B0EC	넁 B101	넊 B10A	넏 B10F	넗 B117	넞 B11E	넠 B120	넡 B121	넢 B122
324x/B2Cx	넫 B12B	넼 B13C	넽 B13D	넾 B13E	넿 B13F	녃 B143	녇 B147	녋 B14B	녓 B153	녙 B159	녚 B15A	녛 B15B	녝 B15D	녣 B163	녤 B164	녬 B16C
325x/B2Dx	녭 B16D	녯 B16F	녱 B171	녺 B17A	녻 B17B	녾 B17E	녿 B17F	놎 B18E	놐 B190	놑 B191	놕 B195	놛 B19B	놤 B1A4	놥 B1A5	놧 B1A7	놩 B1A9
326x/B2Ex	놰 B1B0	놴 B1B4	놸 B1B8	뇄 B1C4	뇍 B1CD	뇓 B1D3	뇠 B1E0	뇡 B1E1	뇦 B1E6	뇯 B1EF	뇸 B1F8	눍 B20D	눐 B210	눓 B213	눛 B21B	눞 B21E
327x/B2Fx	눡 B221	눤 B224	눧 B227	눨 B228	눰 B230	눱 B231	눳 B233	눵 B235	눽 B23D	뉀 B240	뉃 B243	뉄 B244	뉌 B24C	뉍 B24D	뉏 B24F	
332x/B3Ax		뉐 B250	뉑 B251	뉙 B259	뉟 B25F	뉫 B26B	뉭 B26D	뉯 B26F	뉸 B278	뉻 B27B	늇 B287	늊 B28A	늋 B28B	늗 B297	늜 B29C	늧 B2A7
333x/B3Bx	늫 B2AB	늭 B2AD	늳 B2B3	늼 B2BC	늽 B2BD	늿 B2BF	닀 B2C0	닁 B2C1	닏 B2CF	닑 B2D1	닓 B2D3	닔 B2D4	닞 B2DE	닠 B2E0	닣 B2E3	닰 B2F0
334x/B3Cx	닲 B2F2	닶 B2F6	닼 B2FC	닽 B2FD	댇 B307	댙 B319	댝 B31D	댠 B320	댤 B324	댧 B327	댬 B32C	댭 B32D	댯 B32F	댱 B331	댸 B338	댼 B33C
335x/B3Dx	덍 B34D	덙 B359	덦 B366	덨 B368	덪 B36A	덭 B36D	덯 B36F	덷 B377	뎆 B386	뎊 B38A	뎍 B38D	뎏 B38F	뎓 B393	뎘 B398	뎜 B39C	뎝 B39D
336x/B3Ex	뎟 B39F	뎩 B3A9	뎰 B3B0	뎸 B3B8	뎹 B3B9	뎻 B3BB	뎽 B3BD	돆 B3C6	돇 B3C7	돏 B3CF	돓 B3D3	돚 B3DA	돜 B3DC	돞 B3DE	돟 B3DF	돡 B3E1
337x/B3Fx	돰 B3F0	돱 B3F1	돳 B3F3	돴 B3F4	돵 B3F5	됀 B400	됃 B403	됄 B404	됌 B40C	됍 B40D	됏 B40F	됙 B419	됟 B41F	됤 B424	됬 B42C	
342x/B4Ax		됭 B42D	됵 B435	됸 B438	됻 B43B	됼 B43C	둄 B444	둅 B445	둇 B447	둉 B449	둏 B44F	둗 B457	둙 B459	둚 B45A	둛 B45B	둪 B46A
343x/B4Bx	둭 B46D	둰 B470	둳 B473	둴 B474	둼 B47C	둽 B47D	둿 B47F	뒁 B481	뒉 B489	뒌 B48C	뒏 B48F	뒐 B490	뒘 B498	뒙 B499	뒛 B49B	뒜 B49C
344x/B4Cx	뒥 B4A5	뒫 B4AB	뒴 B4B4	뒸 B4B8	듁 B4C1	듑 B4D1	듓 B4D3	듥 B4E5	듧 B4E7	듨 B4E8	듹 B4F9	듼 B4FC	듿 B4FF	딀 B500	딈 B508	딉 B509
345x/B4Dx	딋 B50B	딍 B50D	딫 B52B	딭 B52D	딮 B52E	딯 B52F	딲 B532	딷 B537	딹 B539	딺 B53A	딻 B53B	딿 B53F	땎 B54E	땓 B553	땧 B567	땨 B568
346x/B4Ex	땩 B569	땬 B56C	땽 B57D	떄 B584	떈 B588	떧 B5A7	떯 B5AF	뗃 B5C3	뗙 B5D9	뗜 B5DC	뗟 B5DF	뗨 B5E8	뗩 B5E9	뗫 B5EB	뗭 B5ED	뗴 B5F4
347x/B4Fx	뗸 B5F8	똅 B605	똒 B612	똗 B617	똙 B619	똚 B61A	똟 B61F	똠 B620	똡 B621	똣 B623	똭 B62D	똰 B630	뙁 B641	뙉 B649	뙌 B64C	
352x/B5Ax		뙏 B64F	뙐 B650	뙘 B658	뙙 B659	뙛 B65B	뙜 B65C	뙥 B665	뙫 B66B	뙬 B66C	뙴 B674	뙵 B675	뙷 B677	뙸 B678	뙹 B679	뚀 B680
353x/B5Bx	뚁 B681	뚣 B6A3	뚦 B6A6	뚧 B6A7	뚭 B6AD	뚯 B6AF	뚵 B6B5	뚸 B6B8	뚼 B6BC	뚿 B6BF	뛋 B6CB	뛘 B6D8	뛛 B6DB	뛜 B6DC	뛤 B6E4	뛥 B6E5
354x/B5Cx	뛨 B6E8	뛩 B6E9	뛷 B6F7	뜃 B703	뜌 B70C	뜍 B70D	뜔 B714	뜜 B71C	뜡 B721	뜲 B732	뜳 B733	뜷 B737	뜽 B73D	띙 B759	띡 B761	띧 B767
355x/B5Dx	띻 B77B	랃 B783	랈 B788	랓 B793	랔 B794	랕 B795	랟 B79F	랰 B7B0	랱 B7B1	랲 B7B2	랻 B7BB	랼 B7BC	럄 B7C4	럅 B7C5	럐 B7D0	럣 B7E3
356x/B5Ex	럲 B7F2	럳 B7F3	럾 B7FE	렂 B802	렄 B804	렆 B806	렏 B80F	렜 B81C	렡 B821	렢 B822	렣 B823	렫 B82B	렰 B830	렼 B83C	렾 B83E	롁 B841
357x/B5Fx	롇 B847	롈 B848	롐 B850	롕 B855	롣 B863	롨 B868	롫 B86B	롴 B874	롶 B876	롷 B877	롹 B879	뢀 B880	뢈 B888	뢉 B889	뢋 B88B	
362x/B6Ax		뢌 B88C	뢔 B894	뢘 B898	뢛 B89B	뢜 B89C	뢧 B8A7	뢱 B8B1	뢵 B8B5	뢷 B8B7	룄 B8C4	룍 B8CD	룓 B8D3	룜 B8DC	룯 B8EF	룳 B8F3
363x/B6Bx	뤀 B900	뤂 B902	뤅 B905	뤈 B908	뤋 B90B	뤌 B90C	뤔 B914	뤕 B915	뤗 B917	뤙 B919	뤡 B921	뤤 B924	뤨 B928	뤰 B930	뤱 B931	뤳 B933
364x/B6Cx	뤴 B934	뤵 B935	륃 B943	륍 B94D	륐 B950	륟 B95F	륻 B97B	륽 B97D	릀 B980	릋 B98B	릏 B98F	릐 B990	릑 B991	릔 B994	릘 B998	릞 B99E
365x/B6Dx	릠 B9A0	릡 B9A1	릣 B9A3	릥 B9A5	릳 B9B3	릾 B9BE	맀 B9C0	맄 B9C4	맆 B9C6	맊 B9CA	맔 B9D4	맜 B9DC	맟 B9DF	맠 B9E0	맢 B9E2	맫 B9EB
366x/B6Ex	맭 B9ED	맻 B9FB	맽 B9FD	맾 B9FE	먄 BA04	먐 BA10	먑 BA11	먓 BA13	먘 BA18	먜 BA1C	먻 BA3B	먿 BA3F	멁 BA41	멌 BA4C	멏 BA4F	멛 BA5B
367x/B6Fx	멠 BA60	멪 BA6A	멫 BA6B	멭 BA6D	멷 BA77	멺 BA7A	몀 BA80	몁 BA81	몉 BA89	몍 BA8D	몐 BA90	몓 BA93	몔 BA94	몜 BA9C	몝 BA9D	
372x/B7Ax		몟 BA9F	몡 BAA1	몣 BAA3	몥 BAA5	몦 BAA6	몯 BAAF	몱 BAB1	몴 BAB4	몿 BABF	뫃 BAC3	뫅 BAC5	뫋 BACB	뫌 BACC	뫔 BAD4	뫕 BAD5
373x/B7Bx	뫗 BAD7	뫠 BAE0	뫤 BAE4	뫨 BAE8	뫱 BAF1	뫴 BAF4	뫽 BAFD	묃 BB03	묌 BB0C	묙 BB19	묟 BB1F	묨 BB28	묭 BB2D	묺 BB3A	뭀 BB40	뭋 BB4B
374x/B7Cx	뭑 BB51	뭗 BB57	뭠 BB60	뭤 BB64	뭥 BB65	뭭 BB6D	뭰 BB70	뭴 BB74	뭼 BB7C	뭽 BB7D	뭿 BB7F	뮀 BB80	뮁 BB81	뮉 BB89	뮊 BB8A	뮘 BB98
375x/B7Dx	뮙 BB99	뮛 BB9B	뮜 BB9C	뮝 BB9D	뮥 BBA5	뮫 BBAB	뮵 BBB5	뮹 BBB9	믁 BBC1	믇 BBC7	믉 BBC9	믌 BBCC	믏 BBCF	믑 BBD1	믕 BBD5	믙 BBD9
376x/B7Ex	믜 BBDC	믝 BBDD	믠 BBE0	믤 BBE4	믬 BBEC	믭 BBED	믯 BBEF	믱 BBF1	믲 BBF2	밁 BC01	밄 BC04	밎 BC0E	밐 BC10	밠 BC20	밣 BC23	밨 BC28
377x/B7Fx	밫 BC2B	밬 BC2C	밯 BC2F	밷 BC37	뱆 BC46	뱔 BC54	뱜 BC5C	뱟 BC5F	뱡 BC61	뱧 BC67	뱨 BC68	뱰 BC70	뱷 BC77	뱽 BC7D	벆 BC86	
382x/B8Ax		벍 BC8D	벐 BC90	벘 BC98	벜 BC9C	벝 BC9D	벢 BCA2	벸 BCB8	벹 BCB9	볃 BCC3	볈 BCC8	볌 BCCC	볒 BCD2	볓 BCD3	볔 BCD4	볙 BCD9
383x/B8Bx	볠 BCE0	볨 BCE8	볩 BCE9	볫 BCEB	볭 BCED	볷 BCF7	볻 BCFB	볽 BCFD	볿 BCFF	봊 BD0A	봋 BD0B	봍 BD0D	봏 BD0F	봑 BD11	봗 BD17	봘 BD18
384x/B8Cx	봠 BD20	봡 BD21	봣 BD23	봥 BD25	봰 BD30	봳 BD33	봴 BD34	뵊 BD4A	뵏 BD4F	뵛 BD5B	뵜 BD5C	뵝 BD5D	뵥 BD65	뵬 BD6C	뵴 BD74	뵵 BD75
385x/B8Dx	뵷 BD77	뵹 BD79	붂 BD82	붋 BD8B	붎 BD8E	붖 BD96	붗 BD97	붘 BD98	붛 BD9B	붝 BD9D	붠 BDA0	붣 BDA3	붬 BDAC	붭 BDAD	붯 BDAF	붱 BDB1
386x/B8Ex	붴 BDB4	붹 BDB9	붼 BDBC	붿 BDBF	뷀 BDC0	뷈 BDC8	뷉 BDC9	뷋 BDCB	뷌 BDCC	뷍 BDCD	뷛 BDDB	뷤 BDE4	뷥 BDE5	뷧 BDE7	뷱 BDF1	뷷 BDF7
387x/B8Fx	븁 BE01	븓 BE13	븕 BE15	븗 BE17	븘 BE18	븛 BE1B	븡 BE21	븣 BE23	븥 BE25	븧 BE27	븨 BE28	븩 BE29	븬 BE2C	븰 BE30	븸 BE38	
392x/B9Ax		븹 BE39	븻 BE3B	븽 BE3D	빋 BE4B	빘 BE58	빜 BE5C	빝 BE5D	빟 BE5F	빢 BE62	빧 BE67	빩 BE69	빶 BE76	빹 BE79	빾 BE7E	뺃 BE83
393x/B9Bx	뺜 BE9C	뺴 BEB4	뺸 BEB8	뻡 BEE1	뻦 BEE6	뻭 BEED	뻰 BEF0	뻳 BEF3	뻴 BEF4	뻼 BEFC	뻽 BEFD	뻿 BEFF	뼌 BF0C	뼏 BF0F	뼐 BF10	뼟 BF1F
394x/B9Cx	뼡 BF21	뼤 BF24	뼷 BF37	뼸 BF38	뼹 BF39	뽇 BF47	뽓 BF53	뽛 BF5B	뽜 BF5C	뽠 BF60	뽣 BF63	뽸 BF78	뽿 BF7F	뾤 BFA4	뾥 BFA5	뾬 BFAC
395x/B9Dx	뿀 BFC0	뿁 BFC1	뿓 BFD3	뿕 BFD5	뿝 BFDD	뿨 BFE8	뿯 BFEF	쀄 C004	쀠 C020	쀡 C021	쁃 C043	쁄 C044	쁙 C059	쁟 C05F	쁫 C06B	쁴 C074
396x/B9Ex	삗 C097	삤 C0A4	삦 C0A6	삧 C0A7	삫 C0AB	삮 C0AE	삷 C0B7	삸 C0B8	삺 C0BA	삻 C0BB	샂 C0C2	샃 C0C3	샄 C0C4	샆 C0C6	샇 C0C7	샋 C0CB
397x/B9Fx	샏 C0CF	샣 C0E3	샫 C0EB	샸 C0F8	샻 C0FB	샾 C0FE	샿 C0FF	섥 C125	섨 C128	섪 C12A	섴 C134	섿 C13F	셎 C14E	셑 C151	셒 C152	
3A2x/BAAx		셗 C157	셛 C15B	셟 C15F	셠 C160	셱 C171	셳 C173	솀 C180	솁 C181	솃 C183	솄 C184	솓 C193	솕 C195	솗 C197	솘 C198	솣 C1A3
3A3x/BABx	솦 C1A6	솸 C1B8	솹 C1B9	솻 C1BB	솼 C1BC	쇅 C1C5	쇋 C1CB	쇕 C1D5	쇙 C1D9	쇡 C1E1	쇧 C1E7	쇴 C1F4	쇵 C1F5	숃 C203	숖 C216	숡 C221
3A4x/BACx	숤 C224	숧 C227	숮 C22E	숳 C233	숵 C235	숸 C238	숻 C23B	숼 C23C	쉄 C244	쉅 C245	쉇 C247	쉉 C249	쉗 C257	쉡 C261	쉣 C263	쉤 C264
3A5x/BADx	쉳 C273	슆 C286	슌 C28C	슏 C28F	슙 C299	슫 C2AB	슮 C2AE	슯 C2AF	슰 C2B0	슲 C2B2	슳 C2B3	슺 C2BA	슻 C2BB	슾 C2BE	싀 C2C0	싁 C2C1
3A6x/BAEx	싄 C2C4	싈 C2C8	싐 C2D0	싑 C2D1	싓 C2D3	싕 C2D5	싞 C2DE	싢 C2E2	싥 C2E5	싦 C2E6	싨 C2E8	싰 C2F0	싳 C2F3	싴 C2F4	싿 C2FF	쌁 C301
3A7x/BAFx	쌂 C302	쌋 C30B	쌎 C30E	쌑 C311	쌛 C31B	쌧 C327	쌯 C32F	쌰 C330	쌱 C331	쌴 C334	쌷 C337	쌸 C338	썀 C340	썁 C341	썃 C343	
3B2x/BBAx		썌 C34C	썐 C350	썔 C354	썜 C35C	썡 C361	썪 C36A	썯 C36F	썻 C37B	쎂 C382	쎅 C385	쎋 C38B	쎔 C394	쎕 C395	쎗 C397	쎘 C398
3B3x/BBBx	쎙 C399	쎝 C39D	쎠 C3A0	쎡 C3A1	쎤 C3A4	쎧 C3A7	쎨 C3A8	쎰 C3B0	쎱 C3B1	쎳 C3B3	쎴 C3B4	쎵 C3B5	쎼 C3BC	쎽 C3BD	쏌 C3CC	쏍 C3CD
3B4x/BBCx	쏏 C3CF	쏐 C3D0	쏑 C3D1	쏫 C3EB	쏱 C3F1	쏻 C3FB	쏼 C3FC	쐄 C404	쐅 C405	쐇 C407	쐉 C409	쐑 C411	쐔 C414	쐗 C417	쐘 C418	쐣 C423
3B5x/BBDx	쐭 C42D	쐳 C433	쐿 C43F	쑀 C440	쑁 C441	쑉 C449	쑌 C44C	쑏 C44F	쑐 C450	쑘 C458	쑙 C459	쑛 C45B	쑝 C45D	쑫 C46B	쑷 C477	쑾 C47E
3B6x/BBEx	쒁 C481	쒄 C484	쒇 C487	쒈 C488	쒐 C490	쒑 C491	쒓 C493	쒕 C495	쒝 C49D	쒠 C4A0	쒣 C4A3	쒤 C4A4	쒬 C4AC	쒭 C4AD	쒯 C4AF	쒰 C4B0
3B7x/BBFx	쒱 C4B1	쒹 C4B9	쒿 C4BF	쓀 C4C0	쓈 C4C8	쓉 C4C9	쓋 C4CB	쓍 C4CD	쓓 C4D3	쓔 C4D4	쓕 C4D5	쓘 C4D8	쓛 C4DB	쓜 C4DC	쓤 C4E4	
3C2x/BCAx		쓥 C4E5	쓧 C4E7	쓷 C4F7	씃 C503	씅 C505	씍 C50D	씝 C51D	씟 C51F	씡 C521	씯 C52F	씱 C531	씼 C53C	씿 C53F	앀 C540	앃 C543
3C3x/BCBx	앋 C54B	앏 C54F	앒 C552	앖 C556	앚 C55A	앛 C55B	앟 C55F	앧 C567	앹 C579	앺 C57A	앾 C57E	얃 C583	얐 C590	얒 C592	얔 C594	얙 C599
3C4x/BCCx	얟 C59F	얨 C5A8	얫 C5AB	얬 C5AC	얭 C5AD	얶 C5B6	얺 C5BA	얿 C5BF	엏 C5CF	엗 C5D7	엤 C5E4	엩 C5E9	엪 C5EA	엱 C5F1	엳 C5F3	엸 C5F8
3C5x/BCDx	옄 C604	옉 C609	옏 C60F	옝 C61D	옠 C620	옦 C626	옪 C62A	옫 C62B	옯 C62F	옲 C632	옺 C63A	옽 C63D	옾 C63E	왇 C647	왘 C658	왙 C659
3C6x/BCEx	왣 C663	왤 C664	왭 C66D	왰 C670	왿 C67F	욂 C682	욌 C68C	욒 C692	욛 C69B	욝 C69D	욬 C6AC	욷 C6B7	욼 C6BC	웂 C6C2	웆 C6C6	웇 C6C7
3C7x/BCFx	웉 C6C9	웒 C6D2	웓 C6D3	웟 C6DF	웤 C6E4	웥 C6E5	웯 C6EF	웻 C6FB	웼 C6FC	윁 C701	윋 C70B	윎 C70E	윓 C713	윘 C718	윜 C71C	
3D2x/BDAx		윝 C71D	윧 C727	윶 C736	윸 C738	윹 C739	읃 C743	읅 C745	읆 C746	읇 C747	읎 C74E	읙 C759	읟 C75F	읦 C766	읩 C769	읭 C76D
3D3x/BDBx	읻 C77B	잀 C780	잂 C782	잆 C786	잋 C78B	잌 C78C	잍 C78D	잏 C78F	잓 C793	잙 C799	잧 C7A7	잩 C7A9	잪 C7AA	잫 C7AB	잲 C7B2	잳 C7B3
3D4x/BDCx	쟂 C7C2	쟏 C7CF	쟙 C7D9	쟛 C7DB	쟫 C7EB	쟴 C7F4	쟵 C7F5	쟷 C7F7	쟹 C7F9	젂 C802	젆 C806	젇 C807	젉 C809	젔 C814	젙 C819	젛 C81B
3D5x/BDDx	젣 C823	젰 C830	젲 C832	젹 C839	젿 C83F	졁 C841	졂 C842	졃 C843	졇 C847	졋 C84B	졎 C84E	졑 C851	졓 C853	졕 C855	졘 C858	졜 C85C
3D6x/BDEx	졤 C864	졥 C865	졧 C867	졩 C869	졷 C877	좐 C890	좒 C892	좓 C893	좕 C895	좜 C89C	좠 C8A0	좩 C8A9	좬 C8AC	좯 C8AF	좰 C8B0	좸 C8B8
3D7x/BDFx	좻 C8BB	죅 C8C5	죋 C8CB	죘 C8D8	죧 C8E7	죨 C8E8	죰 C8F0	죱 C8F1	죳 C8F3	죻 C8FB	줃 C903	줈 C908	줗 C917	줙 C919	줜 C91C	
3E2x/BEAx		줟 C91F	줠 C920	줨 C928	줩 C929	줫 C92B	줭 C92D	줵 C935	줸 C938	줻 C93B	줼 C93C	쥄 C944	쥅 C945	쥇 C947	쥈 C948	쥉 C949
3E3x/BEBx	쥗 C957	쥥 C965	쥭 C96D	쥽 C97D	쥿 C97F	즁 C981	즏 C98F	즑 C991	즒 C992	즔 C994	즞 C99E	즤 C9A4	즥 C9A5	즨 C9A8	즬 C9AC	즴 C9B4
3E4x/BECx	즵 C9B5	즷 C9B7	즹 C9B9	짏 C9CF	짒 C9D2	짔 C9D4	짗 C9D7	짛 C9DB	짞 C9DE	짣 C9E3	짨 C9E8	짷 C9F7	짿 C9FF	쨕 CA15	쨚 CA1A	쨜 CA1C
3E5x/BEDx	쨤 CA24	쨥 CA25	쨧 CA27	쨭 CA2D	쨰 CA30	쩓 CA53	쩗 CA57	쩘 CA58	쩛 CA5B	쩧 CA67	쩩 CA69	쩬 CA6C	쩯 CA6F	쩰 CA70	쩸 CA78	쩹 CA79
3E6x/BEEx	쩻 CA7B	쩼 CA7C	쪁 CA81	쪅 CA85	쪈 CA88	쪋 CA8B	쪌 CA8C	쪔 CA94	쪕 CA95	쪗 CA97	쪙 CA99	쪠 CAA0	쪡 CAA1	쪤 CAA4	쪨 CAA8	쪰 CAB0
3E7x/BEFx	쪱 CAB1	쪳 CAB3	쪵 CAB5	쪾 CABE	쫃 CAC3	쫆 CAC6	쫒 CAD2	쫗 CAD7	쫜 CADC	쫟 CADF	쫨 CAE8	쫩 CAE9	쫫 CAEB	쫭 CAED	쫵 CAF5	
3F2x/BFAx		쫸 CAF8	쫻 CAFB	쫼 CAFC	쬑 CB11	쬗 CB17	쬣 CB23	쬤 CB24	쬥 CB25	쬧 CB27	쬬 CB2C	쬭 CB2D	쬰 CB30	쬴 CB34	쬼 CB3C	쬽 CB3D
3F3x/BFBx	쬿 CB3F	쭊 CB4A	쭏 CB4F	쭒 CB52	쭛 CB5B	쭥 CB65	쭨 CB68	쭫 CB6B	쭬 CB6C	쭴 CB74	쭵 CB75	쭷 CB77	쮀 CB80	쮁 CB81	쮄 CB84	쮇 CB87
3F4x/BFCx	쮈 CB88	쮐 CB90	쮑 CB91	쮓 CB93	쮕 CB95	쮝 CB9D	쮠 CBA0	쮣 CBA3	쮤 CBA4	쮬 CBAC	쮭 CBAD	쮯 CBAF	쮱 CBB1	쮹 CBB9	쮼 CBBC	쯀 CBC0
3F5x/BFDx	쯈 CBC8	쯉 CBC9	쯋 CBCB	쯍 CBCD	쯕 CBD5	쯘 CBD8	쯛 CBDB	쯜 CBDC	쯥 CBE5	쯪 CBEA	쯰 CBF0	쯱 CBF1	쯴 CBF4	쯸 CBF8	찀 CC00	찁 CC01
3F6x/BFEx	찃 CC03	찅 CC05	찆 CC06	찓 CC13	찟 CC1F	찦 CC26	찯 CC2F	찱 CC31	찿 CC3F	챂 CC42	챋 CC4B	챛 CC5B	챞 CC5E	챡 CC61	챱 CC71	챳 CC73
3F7x/BFFx	챺 CC7A	챼 CC7C	첑 CC91	첟 CC9F	첧 CCA7	첮 CCAE	첲 CCB2	첻 CCBB	쳃 CCC3	쳈 CCC8	쳑 CCD1	쳗 CCD7	쳘 CCD8	쳠 CCE0	쳡 CCE1	
402x/C0Ax		쳣 CCE3	쳥 CCE5	쳭 CCED	쳴 CCF4	쳼 CCFC	쳽 CCFD	쳿 CCFF	촏 CD0F	촥 CD25	촫 CD2B	촴 CD34	촵 CD35	촷 CD37	쵀 CD40	쵓 CD53
403x/C0Bx	쵔 CD54	쵝 CD5D	쵣 CD63	쵰 CD70	쵹 CD79	쵼 CD7C	춀 CD80	춉 CD89	춋 CD8B	춍 CD8D	춛 CD9B	춱 CDB1	춴 CDB4	춷 CDB7	춸 CDB8	췀 CDC0
404x/C0Cx	췁 CDC1	췃 CDC3	췅 CDC5	췍 CDCD	췔 CDD4	췜 CDDC	췝 CDDD	췟 CDDF	췠 CDE0	췡 CDE1	췩 CDE9	췯 CDEF	츅 CE05	츕 CE15	츗 CE17	츧 CE27
405x/C0Dx	츩 CE29	츬 CE2C	츼 CE3C	츽 CE3D	칀 CE40	칄 CE44	칌 CE4C	칍 CE4D	칏 CE4F	칑 CE51	칢 CE62	칬 CE6C	칮 CE6E	칰 CE70	칲 CE72	칻 CE7B
406x/C0Ex	캈 CE88	캍 CE8D	캎 CE8E	캗 CE97	캩 CEA9	캪 CEAA	캰 CEB0	캴 CEB4	캼 CEBC	캽 CEBD	캿 CEBF	컈 CEC8	컌 CECC	컻 CEFB	컽 CEFD	컾 CEFE
407x/C0Fx	켇 CF07	켔 CF14	켙 CF19	켚 CF1A	켝 CF1D	켣 CF23	켹 CF39	켼 CF3C	콀 CF40	콈 CF48	콉 CF49	콋 CF4B	콌 CF4C	콍 CF4D	콛 CF5B	
412x/C1Ax		콪 CF6A	콮 CF6E	쾁 CF81	쾃 CF83	쾍 CF8D	쾐 CF90	쾓 CF93	쾔 CF94	쾜 CF9C	쾝 CF9D	쾟 CF9F	쾩 CFA9	쾬 CFAC	쾸 CFB8	쾹 CFB9
413x/C1Bx	쾻 CFBB	쾽 CFBD	쿅 CFC5	쿈 CFC8	쿌 CFCC	쿔 CFD4	쿕 CFD5	쿗 CFD7	쿙 CFD9	쿧 CFE7	쿺 CFFA	쿽 CFFD	퀃 D003	퀌 D00C	퀍 D00D	퀐 D010
414x/C1Cx	퀙 D019	퀜 D01C	퀠 D020	퀨 D028	퀩 D029	퀫 D02B	퀬 D02C	퀻 D03B	큑 D051	큡 D061	큣 D063	큥 D065	큨 D068	큲 D072	큶 D076	큿 D07F
415x/C1Dx	킈 D088	킉 D089	킌 D08C	킐 D090	킘 D098	킙 D099	킛 D09B	킝 D09D	킫 D0AB	킸 D0B8	킾 D0BE	탇 D0C7	탊 D0CA	탏 D0CF	탚 D0DA	탢 D0E2
416x/C1Ex	탣 D0E3	탥 D0E5	탶 D0F6	탹 D0F9	탼 D0FC	턀 D100	턈 D108	턉 D109	턋 D10B	턔 D114	턘 D118	턚 D11A	턷 D137	턹 D139	턻 D13B	텓 D153
417x/C1Fx	텠 D160	텦 D166	텩 D169	텯 D16F	텰 D170	텸 D178	텹 D179	텻 D17B	텽 D17D	톅 D185	톌 D18C	톔 D194	톗 D197	톙 D199	톧 D1A7	
422x/C2Ax		톷 D1B7	톸 D1B8	톹 D1B9	톽 D1BD	퇄 D1C4	퇌 D1CC	퇍 D1CD	퇏 D1CF	퇑 D1D1	퇬 D1EC	퇭 D1ED	퇵 D1F5	퇻 D1FB	퇼 D1FC	툄 D204
423x/C2Bx	툅 D205	툈 D208	툑 D211	툔 D214	툘 D218	툠 D220	툡 D221	툣 D223	툥 D225	툳 D233	툶 D236	퉉 D249	퉌 D24C	퉏 D24F	퉐 D250	퉔 D254
424x/C2Cx	퉘 D258	퉙 D259	퉛 D25B	퉝 D25D	퉥 D265	퉨 D268	퉫 D26B	퉬 D26C	퉴 D274	퉵 D275	퉷 D277	퉸 D278	퉹 D279	튇 D287	튓 D293	튝 D29D
425x/C2Dx	튭 D2AD	튯 D2AF	튻 D2BB	틁 D2C1	틄 D2C4	틍 D2CD	틕 D2D5	틠 D2E0	틧 D2E7	틩 D2E9	틷 D2F7	팈 D308	팊 D30A	팓 D313	팣 D323	팦 D326
426x/C2Ex	팯 D32F	퍁 D341	퍈 D348	퍌 D34C	퍔 D354	퍕 D355	퍗 D357	퍙 D359	퍠 D360	펃 D383	펎 D38E	펕 D395	펟 D39F	펬 D3AC	펲 D3B2	펵 D3B5
427x/C2Fx	펹 D3B9	펻 D3BB	폇 D3C7	폑 D3D1	폔 D3D4	폗 D3D7	폠 D3E0	폥 D3E5	폮 D3EE	폳 D3F3	퐄 D404	퐅 D405	퐆 D406	퐉 D409	퐌 D40C	
432x/C3Ax		퐐 D410	퐘 D418	퐙 D419	퐛 D41B	퐤 D424	푁 D441	푈 D448	푐 D450	푑 D451	푓 D453	푕 D455	푝 D45D	푣 D463	푬 D46C	푱 D471
433x/C3Bx	풕 D495	풘 D498	풛 D49B	풜 D49C	풤 D4A4	풥 D4A5	풧 D4A7	풨 D4A8	풰 D4B0	풱 D4B1	풴 D4B4	풸 D4B8	퓀 D4C0	퓁 D4C1	퓃 D4C3	퓅 D4C5
434x/C3Cx	퓍 D4CD	퓝 D4DD	퓡 D4E1	퓩 D4E9	퓯 D4EF	퓹 D4F9	픅 D505	픋 D50B	픐 D510	픙 D519	픠 D520	픡 D521	픤 D524	픨 D528	픰 D530	픱 D531
435x/C3Dx	픳 D533	픵 D535	핃 D543	핕 D555	핖 D556	핟 D55F	핡 D561	핣 D563	핤 D564	핧 D567	핬 D56C	핮 D56E	핱 D571	핻 D57B	햍 D58D	햑 D591
436x/C3Ex	햔 D594	햘 D598	햠 D5A0	햡 D5A1	햣 D5A3	햫 D5AB	햬 D5AC	헀 D5C0	헏 D5CF	헑 D5D1	헗 D5D7	헜 D5DC	헡 D5E1	헢 D5E2	헫 D5EB	헸 D5F8
437x/C3Fx	헾 D5FE	혇 D607	혝 D61D	혬 D62C	혯 D62F	혰 D630	혱 D631	혽 D63D	혿 D63F	홁 D641	홄 D644	홇 D647	홛 D65B	홠 D660	홤 D664	
442x/C4Ax		홥 D665	홦 D666	홨 D668	홷 D677	홸 D678	횀 D680	횁 D681	횄 D684	횓 D693	횜 D69C	횩 D6A9	횯 D6AF	횸 D6B8	횽 D6BD	훋 D6CB
443x/C4Bx	훍 D6CD	훎 D6CE	훒 D6D2	훓 D6D3	훕 D6D5	훜 D6DC	훝 D6DD	훡 D6E1	훱 D6F1	훳 D6F3	훴 D6F4	휃 D703	휌 D70C	휍 D70D	휏 D70F	휐 D710
444x/C4Cx	휟 D71F	휺 D73A	휻 D73B	흃 D743	흅 D745	흍 D74D	흕 D755	흝 D75D	흟 D75F	흨 D768	흪 D76A	흫 D76B	흭 D76D	흳 D773	흿 D77F	힏 D78F
445x/C4Dx	힗 D797	힜 D79C	힠 D7A0													
446x/C4Ex																
447x/C4Fx																

=== Statistics by jamo ===
Initial consonants

Jamo	Count
ㄱ	104
ㄲ	94
ㄴ	114
ㄷ	117
ㄸ	89
ㄹ	102
ㅁ	114
ㅂ	120
ㅃ	60
ㅅ	103
ㅆ	126
ㅇ	102
ㅈ	110
ㅉ	124
ㅊ	87
ㅋ	90
ㅌ	96
ㅍ	86
ㅎ	92
Total	1930

Vowels

Jamo	Count
ㅏ	100
ㅐ	57
ㅑ	99
ㅒ	47
ㅓ	86
ㅔ	83
ㅕ	109
ㅖ	109
ㅗ	98
ㅘ	94
ㅙ	85
ㅚ	85
ㅛ	92
ㅜ	73
ㅝ	121
ㅞ	132
ㅟ	70
ㅠ	78
ㅡ	98
ㅢ	123
ㅣ	91
Total	1930

Final consonants

Jamo	Count
(none)	50
ㄱ	152
ㄲ	28
ㄳ	13
ㄴ	97
ㄵ	7
ㄶ	18
ㄷ	267
ㄹ	104
ㄺ	47
ㄻ	26
ㄼ	30
ㄽ	52
ㄾ	1
ㄿ	13
ㅀ	34
ㅁ	137
ㅂ	146
ㅄ	12
ㅅ	155
ㅆ	96
ㅇ	124
ㅈ	46
ㅊ	48
ㅋ	46
ㅌ	68
ㅍ	64
ㅎ	49
Total	1930
