= Hangul (obsolete Unicode block) =

Unicode 1.x block, removed in Unicode 2.0

Hangul, Hangul Supplementary-A, and Hangul Supplementary-B were character blocks that existed in Unicode 1.0 and 1.1, and ISO/IEC 10646-1:1993. These three Unicode 1.x blocks encoding precomposed modern Hangul syllables were deleted and superseded by the new Hangul Syllables block (U+AC00–U+D7AF) in Unicode 2.0 (July 1996) and ISO/IEC 10646-1:1993 Amd. 5 (1998).

The old code points have been reused and are now occupied by CJK Unified Ideographs Extension A and Yijing Hexagram Symbols. Moving or removing existing characters has been prohibited by the Unicode Stability Policy for all versions following Unicode 2.0, so the Hangul Syllables block introduced in Unicode 2.0 is immutable.

== Documentation ==
The Unicode 1.0.0 code chart is still available online, including the Korean Hangul Syllables block, but not the supplements added in Unicode 1.1. Full code charts for Unicode 1.1 were "never created", because Unicode 1.1 was published only as a report amending Unicode 1.0 due to the urgency of releasing it; however, full code charts for ISO/IEC 10646-1:1993 were available, covering all three blocks.

Data for mapping between Unicode 1.1, Unicode 2.0 and other Hangul encodings has been supplied by the Unicode Consortium. This data is archived as historic, but contains errors; an errata document is also supplied which corrects the mappings with reference to decompositions from the Unicode Character Database for Unicode 1.1.5, which is itself also available. However, the Unicode 1.1.5 data itself contains some errors; corrected data with reference to the ISO/IEC 10646-1:1993 code charts and the source standards is documented in the Unicode Technical Committee document UTC L2/17-080.

- U+384E: 삤 in the Unicode Character Database for Unicode 1.1.5, but 삣 in the Unicode 1.0 and ISO/IEC 10646-1:1993 code charts and per the source standard mappings
- U+40BC: 삣 in the Unicode Character Database for Unicode 1.1.5, but 삤 in the ISO/IEC 10646-1:1993 code charts and per the source standard mappings
- U+436C: 콫 in the Unicode Character Database for Unicode 1.1.5, but 콪 in the ISO/IEC 10646-1:1993 code charts and per the source standard mappings

== Korean Hangul Syllables block ==
Korean Hangul Syllables
- Range: U+3400..U+3D2D (2,350 code points)
- Plane: BMP
- Scripts: Hangul
- Status: Deleted prior to the release of Unicode 2.0
- Now occupied by: CJK Unified Ideographs Extension A
- Source standards: KS C 5601-1987

Unicode Version History
- 1.0.0 (1991): 2,350 (+2,350)
- 2.0 (1996): 0 (-2350)

Chart
- Code chart
- Note: Block deleted in Unicode 2.0, with characters moved to Hangul Syllables block.

The former Hangul (U+3400–U+3D2D), also called Korean Hangul Syllables, consisted of 2,350 syllables from KS C 5601-1987 (now KS X 1001). This block was encoded from Unicode 1.0.0 and included in the main code chart (without character names) but not in the block charts (which included character names).

Korean Hangul Syllables^{[1]}^{[2]} Unicode Consortium code chart (obsolete) (PDF)
	0	1	2	3	4	5	6	7	8	9	A	B	C	D	E	F
U+340x	가	각	간	갇	갈	갉	갊	감	갑	값	갓	갔	강	갖	갗	같
U+341x	갚	갛	개	객	갠	갤	갬	갭	갯	갰	갱	갸	갹	갼	걀	걋
U+342x	걍	걔	걘	걜	거	걱	건	걷	걸	걺	검	겁	것	겄	겅	겆
U+343x	겉	겊	겋	게	겐	겔	겜	겝	겟	겠	겡	겨	격	겪	견	겯
U+344x	결	겸	겹	겻	겼	경	곁	계	곈	곌	곕	곗	고	곡	곤	곧
U+345x	골	곪	곬	곯	곰	곱	곳	공	곶	과	곽	관	괄	괆	괌	괍
U+346x	괏	광	괘	괜	괠	괩	괬	괭	괴	괵	괸	괼	굄	굅	굇	굉
U+347x	교	굔	굘	굡	굣	구	국	군	굳	굴	굵	굶	굻	굼	굽	굿
U+348x	궁	궂	궈	궉	권	궐	궜	궝	궤	궷	귀	귁	귄	귈	귐	귑
U+349x	귓	규	균	귤	그	극	근	귿	글	긁	금	급	긋	긍	긔	기
U+34Ax	긱	긴	긷	길	긺	김	깁	깃	깅	깆	깊	까	깍	깎	깐	깔
U+34Bx	깖	깜	깝	깟	깠	깡	깥	깨	깩	깬	깰	깸	깹	깻	깼	깽
U+34Cx	꺄	꺅	꺌	꺼	꺽	꺾	껀	껄	껌	껍	껏	껐	껑	께	껙	껜
U+34Dx	껨	껫	껭	껴	껸	껼	꼇	꼈	꼍	꼐	꼬	꼭	꼰	꼲	꼴	꼼
U+34Ex	꼽	꼿	꽁	꽂	꽃	꽈	꽉	꽐	꽜	꽝	꽤	꽥	꽹	꾀	꾄	꾈
U+34Fx	꾐	꾑	꾕	꾜	꾸	꾹	꾼	꿀	꿇	꿈	꿉	꿋	꿍	꿎	꿔	꿜
U+350x	꿨	꿩	꿰	꿱	꿴	꿸	뀀	뀁	뀄	뀌	뀐	뀔	뀜	뀝	뀨	끄
U+351x	끅	끈	끊	끌	끎	끓	끔	끕	끗	끙	끝	끼	끽	낀	낄	낌
U+352x	낍	낏	낑	나	낙	낚	난	낟	날	낡	낢	남	납	낫	났	낭
U+353x	낮	낯	낱	낳	내	낵	낸	낼	냄	냅	냇	냈	냉	냐	냑	냔
U+354x	냘	냠	냥	너	넉	넋	넌	널	넒	넓	넘	넙	넛	넜	넝	넣
U+355x	네	넥	넨	넬	넴	넵	넷	넸	넹	녀	녁	년	녈	념	녑	녔
U+356x	녕	녘	녜	녠	노	녹	논	놀	놂	놈	놉	놋	농	높	놓	놔
U+357x	놘	놜	놨	뇌	뇐	뇔	뇜	뇝	뇟	뇨	뇩	뇬	뇰	뇹	뇻	뇽
U+358x	누	눅	눈	눋	눌	눔	눕	눗	눙	눠	눴	눼	뉘	뉜	뉠	뉨
U+359x	뉩	뉴	뉵	뉼	늄	늅	늉	느	늑	는	늘	늙	늚	늠	늡	늣
U+35Ax	능	늦	늪	늬	늰	늴	니	닉	닌	닐	닒	님	닙	닛	닝	닢
U+35Bx	다	닥	닦	단	닫	달	닭	닮	닯	닳	담	답	닷	닸	당	닺
U+35Cx	닻	닿	대	댁	댄	댈	댐	댑	댓	댔	댕	댜	더	덕	덖	던
U+35Dx	덛	덜	덞	덟	덤	덥	덧	덩	덫	덮	데	덱	덴	델	뎀	뎁
U+35Ex	뎃	뎄	뎅	뎌	뎐	뎔	뎠	뎡	뎨	뎬	도	독	돈	돋	돌	돎
U+35Fx	돐	돔	돕	돗	동	돛	돝	돠	돤	돨	돼	됐	되	된	될	됨
U+360x	됩	됫	됴	두	둑	둔	둘	둠	둡	둣	둥	둬	뒀	뒈	뒝	뒤
U+361x	뒨	뒬	뒵	뒷	뒹	듀	듄	듈	듐	듕	드	득	든	듣	들	듦
U+362x	듬	듭	듯	등	듸	디	딕	딘	딛	딜	딤	딥	딧	딨	딩	딪
U+363x	따	딱	딴	딸	땀	땁	땃	땄	땅	땋	때	땍	땐	땔	땜	땝
U+364x	땟	땠	땡	떠	떡	떤	떨	떪	떫	떰	떱	떳	떴	떵	떻	떼
U+365x	떽	뗀	뗄	뗌	뗍	뗏	뗐	뗑	뗘	뗬	또	똑	똔	똘	똥	똬
U+366x	똴	뙈	뙤	뙨	뚜	뚝	뚠	뚤	뚫	뚬	뚱	뛔	뛰	뛴	뛸	뜀
U+367x	뜁	뜅	뜨	뜩	뜬	뜯	뜰	뜸	뜹	뜻	띄	띈	띌	띔	띕	띠
U+368x	띤	띨	띰	띱	띳	띵	라	락	란	랄	람	랍	랏	랐	랑	랒
U+369x	랖	랗	래	랙	랜	랠	램	랩	랫	랬	랭	랴	략	랸	럇	량
U+36Ax	러	럭	런	럴	럼	럽	럿	렀	렁	렇	레	렉	렌	렐	렘	렙
U+36Bx	렛	렝	려	력	련	렬	렴	렵	렷	렸	령	례	롄	롑	롓	로
U+36Cx	록	론	롤	롬	롭	롯	롱	롸	롼	뢍	뢨	뢰	뢴	뢸	룀	룁
U+36Dx	룃	룅	료	룐	룔	룝	룟	룡	루	룩	룬	룰	룸	룹	룻	룽
U+36Ex	뤄	뤘	뤠	뤼	뤽	륀	륄	륌	륏	륑	류	륙	륜	률	륨	륩
U+36Fx	륫	륭	르	륵	른	를	름	릅	릇	릉	릊	릍	릎	리	릭	린
U+370x	릴	림	립	릿	링	마	막	만	많	맏	말	맑	맒	맘	맙	맛
U+371x	망	맞	맡	맣	매	맥	맨	맬	맴	맵	맷	맸	맹	맺	먀	먁
U+372x	먈	먕	머	먹	먼	멀	멂	멈	멉	멋	멍	멎	멓	메	멕	멘
U+373x	멜	멤	멥	멧	멨	멩	며	멱	면	멸	몃	몄	명	몇	몌	모
U+374x	목	몫	몬	몰	몲	몸	몹	못	몽	뫄	뫈	뫘	뫙	뫼	묀	묄
U+375x	묍	묏	묑	묘	묜	묠	묩	묫	무	묵	묶	문	묻	물	묽	묾
U+376x	뭄	뭅	뭇	뭉	뭍	뭏	뭐	뭔	뭘	뭡	뭣	뭬	뮈	뮌	뮐	뮤
U+377x	뮨	뮬	뮴	뮷	므	믄	믈	믐	믓	미	믹	민	믿	밀	밂	밈
U+378x	밉	밋	밌	밍	및	밑	바	박	밖	밗	반	받	발	밝	밞	밟
U+379x	밤	밥	밧	방	밭	배	백	밴	밸	뱀	뱁	뱃	뱄	뱅	뱉	뱌
U+37Ax	뱍	뱐	뱝	버	벅	번	벋	벌	벎	범	법	벗	벙	벚	베	벡
U+37Bx	벤	벧	벨	벰	벱	벳	벴	벵	벼	벽	변	별	볍	볏	볐	병
U+37Cx	볕	볘	볜	보	복	볶	본	볼	봄	봅	봇	봉	봐	봔	봤	봬
U+37Dx	뵀	뵈	뵉	뵌	뵐	뵘	뵙	뵤	뵨	부	북	분	붇	불	붉	붊
U+37Ex	붐	붑	붓	붕	붙	붚	붜	붤	붰	붸	뷔	뷕	뷘	뷜	뷩	뷰
U+37Fx	뷴	뷸	븀	븃	븅	브	븍	븐	블	븜	븝	븟	비	빅	빈	빌
U+380x	빎	빔	빕	빗	빙	빚	빛	빠	빡	빤	빨	빪	빰	빱	빳	빴
U+381x	빵	빻	빼	빽	뺀	뺄	뺌	뺍	뺏	뺐	뺑	뺘	뺙	뺨	뻐	뻑
U+382x	뻔	뻗	뻘	뻠	뻣	뻤	뻥	뻬	뼁	뼈	뼉	뼘	뼙	뼛	뼜	뼝
U+383x	뽀	뽁	뽄	뽈	뽐	뽑	뽕	뾔	뾰	뿅	뿌	뿍	뿐	뿔	뿜	뿟
U+384x	뿡	쀼	쁑	쁘	쁜	쁠	쁨	쁩	삐	삑	삔	삘	삠	삡	삣	삥
U+385x	사	삭	삯	산	삳	살	삵	삶	삼	삽	삿	샀	상	샅	새	색
U+386x	샌	샐	샘	샙	샛	샜	생	샤	샥	샨	샬	샴	샵	샷	샹	섀
U+387x	섄	섈	섐	섕	서	석	섞	섟	선	섣	설	섦	섧	섬	섭	섯
U+388x	섰	성	섶	세	섹	센	셀	셈	셉	셋	셌	셍	셔	셕	션	셜
U+389x	셤	셥	셧	셨	셩	셰	셴	셸	솅	소	속	솎	손	솔	솖	솜
U+38Ax	솝	솟	송	솥	솨	솩	솬	솰	솽	쇄	쇈	쇌	쇔	쇗	쇘	쇠
U+38Bx	쇤	쇨	쇰	쇱	쇳	쇼	쇽	숀	숄	숌	숍	숏	숑	수	숙	순
U+38Cx	숟	술	숨	숩	숫	숭	숯	숱	숲	숴	쉈	쉐	쉑	쉔	쉘	쉠
U+38Dx	쉥	쉬	쉭	쉰	쉴	쉼	쉽	쉿	슁	슈	슉	슐	슘	슛	슝	스
U+38Ex	슥	슨	슬	슭	슴	습	슷	승	시	식	신	싣	실	싫	심	십
U+38Fx	싯	싱	싶	싸	싹	싻	싼	쌀	쌈	쌉	쌌	쌍	쌓	쌔	쌕	쌘
U+390x	쌜	쌤	쌥	쌨	쌩	썅	써	썩	썬	썰	썲	썸	썹	썼	썽	쎄
U+391x	쎈	쎌	쏀	쏘	쏙	쏜	쏟	쏠	쏢	쏨	쏩	쏭	쏴	쏵	쏸	쐈
U+392x	쐐	쐤	쐬	쐰	쐴	쐼	쐽	쑈	쑤	쑥	쑨	쑬	쑴	쑵	쑹	쒀
U+393x	쒔	쒜	쒸	쒼	쓩	쓰	쓱	쓴	쓸	쓺	쓿	씀	씁	씌	씐	씔
U+394x	씜	씨	씩	씬	씰	씸	씹	씻	씽	아	악	안	앉	않	알	앍
U+395x	앎	앓	암	압	앗	았	앙	앝	앞	애	액	앤	앨	앰	앱	앳
U+396x	앴	앵	야	약	얀	얄	얇	얌	얍	얏	양	얕	얗	얘	얜	얠
U+397x	얩	어	억	언	얹	얻	얼	얽	얾	엄	업	없	엇	었	엉	엊
U+398x	엌	엎	에	엑	엔	엘	엠	엡	엣	엥	여	역	엮	연	열	엶
U+399x	엷	염	엽	엾	엿	였	영	옅	옆	옇	예	옌	옐	옘	옙	옛
U+39Ax	옜	오	옥	온	올	옭	옮	옰	옳	옴	옵	옷	옹	옻	와	왁
U+39Bx	완	왈	왐	왑	왓	왔	왕	왜	왝	왠	왬	왯	왱	외	왹	왼
U+39Cx	욀	욈	욉	욋	욍	요	욕	욘	욜	욤	욥	욧	용	우	욱	운
U+39Dx	울	욹	욺	움	웁	웃	웅	워	웍	원	월	웜	웝	웠	웡	웨
U+39Ex	웩	웬	웰	웸	웹	웽	위	윅	윈	윌	윔	윕	윗	윙	유	육
U+39Fx	윤	율	윰	윱	윳	융	윷	으	윽	은	을	읊	음	읍	읏	응
U+3A0x	읒	읓	읔	읕	읖	읗	의	읜	읠	읨	읫	이	익	인	일	읽
U+3A1x	읾	잃	임	입	잇	있	잉	잊	잎	자	작	잔	잖	잗	잘	잚
U+3A2x	잠	잡	잣	잤	장	잦	재	잭	잰	잴	잼	잽	잿	쟀	쟁	쟈
U+3A3x	쟉	쟌	쟎	쟐	쟘	쟝	쟤	쟨	쟬	저	적	전	절	젊	점	접
U+3A4x	젓	정	젖	제	젝	젠	젤	젬	젭	젯	젱	져	젼	졀	졈	졉
U+3A5x	졌	졍	졔	조	족	존	졸	졺	좀	좁	좃	종	좆	좇	좋	좌
U+3A6x	좍	좔	좝	좟	좡	좨	좼	좽	죄	죈	죌	죔	죕	죗	죙	죠
U+3A7x	죡	죤	죵	주	죽	준	줄	줅	줆	줌	줍	줏	중	줘	줬	줴
U+3A8x	쥐	쥑	쥔	쥘	쥠	쥡	쥣	쥬	쥰	쥴	쥼	즈	즉	즌	즐	즘
U+3A9x	즙	즛	증	지	직	진	짇	질	짊	짐	집	짓	징	짖	짙	짚
U+3AAx	짜	짝	짠	짢	짤	짧	짬	짭	짯	짰	짱	째	짹	짼	쨀	쨈
U+3ABx	쨉	쨋	쨌	쨍	쨔	쨘	쨩	쩌	쩍	쩐	쩔	쩜	쩝	쩟	쩠	쩡
U+3ACx	쩨	쩽	쪄	쪘	쪼	쪽	쫀	쫄	쫌	쫍	쫏	쫑	쫓	쫘	쫙	쫠
U+3ADx	쫬	쫴	쬈	쬐	쬔	쬘	쬠	쬡	쭁	쭈	쭉	쭌	쭐	쭘	쭙	쭝
U+3AEx	쭤	쭸	쭹	쮜	쮸	쯔	쯤	쯧	쯩	찌	찍	찐	찔	찜	찝	찡
U+3AFx	찢	찧	차	착	찬	찮	찰	참	찹	찻	찼	창	찾	채	책	챈
U+3B0x	챌	챔	챕	챗	챘	챙	챠	챤	챦	챨	챰	챵	처	척	천	철
U+3B1x	첨	첩	첫	첬	청	체	첵	첸	첼	쳄	쳅	쳇	쳉	쳐	쳔	쳤
U+3B2x	쳬	쳰	촁	초	촉	촌	촐	촘	촙	촛	총	촤	촨	촬	촹	최
U+3B3x	쵠	쵤	쵬	쵭	쵯	쵱	쵸	춈	추	축	춘	출	춤	춥	춧	충
U+3B4x	춰	췄	췌	췐	취	췬	췰	췸	췹	췻	췽	츄	츈	츌	츔	츙
U+3B5x	츠	측	츤	츨	츰	츱	츳	층	치	칙	친	칟	칠	칡	침	칩
U+3B6x	칫	칭	카	칵	칸	칼	캄	캅	캇	캉	캐	캑	캔	캘	캠	캡
U+3B7x	캣	캤	캥	캬	캭	컁	커	컥	컨	컫	컬	컴	컵	컷	컸	컹
U+3B8x	케	켁	켄	켈	켐	켑	켓	켕	켜	켠	켤	켬	켭	켯	켰	켱
U+3B9x	켸	코	콕	콘	콜	콤	콥	콧	콩	콰	콱	콴	콸	쾀	쾅	쾌
U+3BAx	쾡	쾨	쾰	쿄	쿠	쿡	쿤	쿨	쿰	쿱	쿳	쿵	쿼	퀀	퀄	퀑
U+3BBx	퀘	퀭	퀴	퀵	퀸	퀼	큄	큅	큇	큉	큐	큔	큘	큠	크	큭
U+3BCx	큰	클	큼	큽	킁	키	킥	킨	킬	킴	킵	킷	킹	타	탁	탄
U+3BDx	탈	탉	탐	탑	탓	탔	탕	태	택	탠	탤	탬	탭	탯	탰	탱
U+3BEx	탸	턍	터	턱	턴	털	턺	텀	텁	텃	텄	텅	테	텍	텐	텔
U+3BFx	템	텝	텟	텡	텨	텬	텼	톄	톈	토	톡	톤	톨	톰	톱	톳
U+3C0x	통	톺	톼	퇀	퇘	퇴	퇸	툇	툉	툐	투	툭	툰	툴	툼	툽
U+3C1x	툿	퉁	퉈	퉜	퉤	튀	튁	튄	튈	튐	튑	튕	튜	튠	튤	튬
U+3C2x	튱	트	특	튼	튿	틀	틂	틈	틉	틋	틔	틘	틜	틤	틥	티
U+3C3x	틱	틴	틸	팀	팁	팃	팅	파	팍	팎	판	팔	팖	팜	팝	팟
U+3C4x	팠	팡	팥	패	팩	팬	팰	팸	팹	팻	팼	팽	퍄	퍅	퍼	퍽
U+3C5x	펀	펄	펌	펍	펏	펐	펑	페	펙	펜	펠	펨	펩	펫	펭	펴
U+3C6x	편	펼	폄	폅	폈	평	폐	폘	폡	폣	포	폭	폰	폴	폼	폽
U+3C7x	폿	퐁	퐈	퐝	푀	푄	표	푠	푤	푭	푯	푸	푹	푼	푿	풀
U+3C8x	풂	품	풉	풋	풍	풔	풩	퓌	퓐	퓔	퓜	퓟	퓨	퓬	퓰	퓸
U+3C9x	퓻	퓽	프	픈	플	픔	픕	픗	피	픽	핀	필	핌	핍	핏	핑
U+3CAx	하	학	한	할	핥	함	합	핫	항	해	핵	핸	핼	햄	햅	햇
U+3CBx	했	행	햐	향	허	헉	헌	헐	헒	험	헙	헛	헝	헤	헥	헨
U+3CCx	헬	헴	헵	헷	헹	혀	혁	현	혈	혐	협	혓	혔	형	혜	혠
U+3CDx	혤	혭	호	혹	혼	홀	홅	홈	홉	홋	홍	홑	화	확	환	활
U+3CEx	홧	황	홰	홱	홴	횃	횅	회	획	횐	횔	횝	횟	횡	효	횬
U+3CFx	횰	횹	횻	후	훅	훈	훌	훑	훔	훗	훙	훠	훤	훨	훰	훵
U+3D0x	훼	훽	휀	휄	휑	휘	휙	휜	휠	휨	휩	휫	휭	휴	휵	휸
U+3D1x	휼	흄	흇	흉	흐	흑	흔	흖	흗	흘	흙	흠	흡	흣	흥	흩
U+3D2x	희	흰	흴	흼	흽	힁	히	힉	힌	힐	힘	힙	힛	힝		
Notes 1.As of Unicode version 1.1. Characters in chart are shown by means of equivalent code points in Unicode 2.0 and all subsequent versions. 2.Grey areas indicate points outside of the block, since its boundaries (unusually) were not aligned to multiples of 16.

== Hangul Supplementary-A block ==
Hangul Supplementary-A
- Range: U+3D2E..U+44B7 (1,930 code points)
- Plane: BMP
- Scripts: Hangul
- Status: Deleted prior to the release of Unicode 2.0
- Now occupied by: CJK Unified Ideographs Extension A
- Source standards: KS C 5657-1991

Unicode Version History
- 1.1 (1993): 1,930 (+1,930)
- 2.0 (1996): 0 (-1930)
- Note: Block deleted in Unicode 2.0, with characters moved to Hangul Syllables block.

Hangul Supplementary-A (U+3D2E–U+44B7) consisted of 1,930 syllables from KS C 5657-1991 (now KS X 1002).

Hangul Supplementary-A^{[1]}^{[2]} References:
	0	1	2	3	4	5	6	7	8	9	A	B	C	D	E	F
U+3D2x															갂	갋
U+3D3x	갌	갢	갣	갲	갵	갶	갿	걁	걇	걈	걉	걌	걤	걥	걳	걵
U+3D4x	걹	겇	겍	겓	겥	겧	겱	겴	겷	겾	겿	곂	곅	곋	곔	곘
U+3D5x	곙	곩	곫	곮	곷	곹	곺	곻	괃	괐	괙	괟	괢	괨	괫	괻
U+3D6x	괾	굈	굑	굗	굠	굥	굸	궃	궆	궏	궙	궛	궥	궨	궫	궬
U+3D7x	궴	궵	궸	궹	귇	귊	귔	귕	귝	귨	귬	귭	귯	귱	귾	긂
U+3D8x	긃	긄	긇	긎	긏	긑	긒	긓	긕	긘	긜	긠	긤	긥	긧	긩
U+3D9x	긹	긼	깄	깇	깉	깋	깓	깢	깣	깪	깯	깳	깶	꺁	꺈	꺋
U+3DAx	꺍	꺗	꺙	꺠	꺵	껂	껃	껒	껓	껕	껚	껟	껠	껩	껬	껱
U+3DBx	껵	껻	꼄	꼅	꼉	꼗	꼥	꼳	꼶	꼸	꼻	꽅	꽇	꽌	꽏	꽘
U+3DCx	꽙	꽛	꽨	꽫	꽬	꽴	꽵	꽸	꾁	꾇	꾓	꾔	꾠	꾣	꾤	꾬
U+3DDx	꾭	꾲	꾿	꿁	꿏	꿕	꿘	꿛	꿤	꿧	꿷	뀃	뀅	뀍	뀓	뀟
U+3DEx	뀡	뀬	뀰	뀸	뀹	끋	끍	끛	끟	끠	끡	끧	끨	끫	끳	끵
U+3DFx	낃	낋	낐	낕	낛	낤	낪	낰	낲	낻	냎	냗	냡	냣	냦	냩
U+3E0x	냬	넁	넊	넏	넗	넞	넠	넡	넢	넫	넼	넽	넾	넿	녃	녇
U+3E1x	녋	녓	녙	녚	녛	녝	녣	녤	녬	녭	녯	녱	녺	녻	녾	녿
U+3E2x	놎	놐	놑	놕	놛	놤	놥	놧	놩	놰	놴	놸	뇄	뇍	뇓	뇠
U+3E3x	뇡	뇦	뇯	뇸	눍	눐	눓	눛	눞	눡	눤	눧	눨	눰	눱	눳
U+3E4x	눵	눽	뉀	뉃	뉄	뉌	뉍	뉏	뉐	뉑	뉙	뉟	뉫	뉭	뉯	뉸
U+3E5x	뉻	늇	늊	늋	늗	늜	늧	늫	늭	늳	늼	늽	늿	닀	닁	닏
U+3E6x	닑	닓	닔	닞	닠	닣	닰	닲	닶	닼	닽	댇	댙	댝	댠	댤
U+3E7x	댧	댬	댭	댯	댱	댸	댼	덍	덙	덦	덨	덪	덭	덯	덷	뎆
U+3E8x	뎊	뎍	뎏	뎓	뎘	뎜	뎝	뎟	뎩	뎰	뎸	뎹	뎻	뎽	돆	돇
U+3E9x	돏	돓	돚	돜	돞	돟	돡	돰	돱	돳	돴	돵	됀	됃	됄	됌
U+3EAx	됍	됏	됙	됟	됤	됬	됭	됵	됸	됻	됼	둄	둅	둇	둉	둏
U+3EBx	둗	둙	둚	둛	둪	둭	둰	둳	둴	둼	둽	둿	뒁	뒉	뒌	뒏
U+3ECx	뒐	뒘	뒙	뒛	뒜	뒥	뒫	뒴	뒸	듁	듑	듓	듥	듧	듨	듹
U+3EDx	듼	듿	딀	딈	딉	딋	딍	딫	딭	딮	딯	딲	딷	딹	딺	딻
U+3EEx	딿	땎	땓	땧	땨	땩	땬	땽	떄	떈	떧	떯	뗃	뗙	뗜	뗟
U+3EFx	뗨	뗩	뗫	뗭	뗴	뗸	똅	똒	똗	똙	똚	똟	똠	똡	똣	똭
U+3F0x	똰	뙁	뙉	뙌	뙏	뙐	뙘	뙙	뙛	뙜	뙥	뙫	뙬	뙴	뙵	뙷
U+3F1x	뙸	뙹	뚀	뚁	뚣	뚦	뚧	뚭	뚯	뚵	뚸	뚼	뚿	뛋	뛘	뛛
U+3F2x	뛜	뛤	뛥	뛨	뛩	뛷	뜃	뜌	뜍	뜔	뜜	뜡	뜲	뜳	뜷	뜽
U+3F3x	띙	띡	띧	띻	랃	랈	랓	랔	랕	랟	랰	랱	랲	랻	랼	럄
U+3F4x	럅	럐	럣	럲	럳	럾	렂	렄	렆	렏	렜	렡	렢	렣	렫	렰
U+3F5x	렼	렾	롁	롇	롈	롐	롕	롣	롨	롫	롴	롶	롷	롹	뢀	뢈
U+3F6x	뢉	뢋	뢌	뢔	뢘	뢛	뢜	뢧	뢱	뢵	뢷	룄	룍	룓	룜	룯
U+3F7x	룳	뤀	뤂	뤅	뤈	뤋	뤌	뤔	뤕	뤗	뤙	뤡	뤤	뤨	뤰	뤱
U+3F8x	뤳	뤴	뤵	륃	륍	륐	륟	륻	륽	릀	릋	릏	릐	릑	릔	릘
U+3F9x	릞	릠	릡	릣	릥	릳	릾	맀	맄	맆	맊	맔	맜	맟	맠	맢
U+3FAx	맫	맭	맻	맽	맾	먄	먐	먑	먓	먘	먜	먻	먿	멁	멌	멏
U+3FBx	멛	멠	멪	멫	멭	멷	멺	몀	몁	몉	몍	몐	몓	몔	몜	몝
U+3FCx	몟	몡	몣	몥	몦	몯	몱	몴	몿	뫃	뫅	뫋	뫌	뫔	뫕	뫗
U+3FDx	뫠	뫤	뫨	뫱	뫴	뫽	묃	묌	묙	묟	묨	묭	묺	뭀	뭋	뭑
U+3FEx	뭗	뭠	뭤	뭥	뭭	뭰	뭴	뭼	뭽	뭿	뮀	뮁	뮉	뮊	뮘	뮙
U+3FFx	뮛	뮜	뮝	뮥	뮫	뮵	뮹	믁	믇	믉	믌	믏	믑	믕	믙	믜
U+400x	믝	믠	믤	믬	믭	믯	믱	믲	밁	밄	밎	밐	밠	밣	밨	밫
U+401x	밬	밯	밷	뱆	뱔	뱜	뱟	뱡	뱧	뱨	뱰	뱷	뱽	벆	벍	벐
U+402x	벘	벜	벝	벢	벸	벹	볃	볈	볌	볒	볓	볔	볙	볠	볨	볩
U+403x	볫	볭	볷	볻	볽	볿	봊	봋	봍	봏	봑	봗	봘	봠	봡	봣
U+404x	봥	봰	봳	봴	뵊	뵏	뵛	뵜	뵝	뵥	뵬	뵴	뵵	뵷	뵹	붂
U+405x	붋	붎	붖	붗	붘	붛	붝	붠	붣	붬	붭	붯	붱	붴	붹	붼
U+406x	붿	뷀	뷈	뷉	뷋	뷌	뷍	뷛	뷤	뷥	뷧	뷱	뷷	븁	븓	븕
U+407x	븗	븘	븛	븡	븣	븥	븧	븨	븩	븬	븰	븸	븹	븻	븽	빋
U+408x	빘	빜	빝	빟	빢	빧	빩	빶	빹	빾	뺃	뺜	뺴	뺸	뻡	뻦
U+409x	뻭	뻰	뻳	뻴	뻼	뻽	뻿	뼌	뼏	뼐	뼟	뼡	뼤	뼷	뼸	뼹
U+40Ax	뽇	뽓	뽛	뽜	뽠	뽣	뽸	뽿	뾤	뾥	뾬	뿀	뿁	뿓	뿕	뿝
U+40Bx	뿨	뿯	쀄	쀠	쀡	쁃	쁄	쁙	쁟	쁫	쁴	삗	삤	삦	삧	삫
U+40Cx	삮	삷	삸	삺	삻	샂	샃	샄	샆	샇	샋	샏	샣	샫	샸	샻
U+40Dx	샾	샿	섥	섨	섪	섴	섿	셎	셑	셒	셗	셛	셟	셠	셱	셳
U+40Ex	솀	솁	솃	솄	솓	솕	솗	솘	솣	솦	솸	솹	솻	솼	쇅	쇋
U+40Fx	쇕	쇙	쇡	쇧	쇴	쇵	숃	숖	숡	숤	숧	숮	숳	숵	숸	숻
U+410x	숼	쉄	쉅	쉇	쉉	쉗	쉡	쉣	쉤	쉳	슆	슌	슏	슙	슫	슮
U+411x	슯	슰	슲	슳	슺	슻	슾	싀	싁	싄	싈	싐	싑	싓	싕	싞
U+412x	싢	싥	싦	싨	싰	싳	싴	싿	쌁	쌂	쌋	쌎	쌑	쌛	쌧	쌯
U+413x	쌰	쌱	쌴	쌷	쌸	썀	썁	썃	썌	썐	썔	썜	썡	썪	썯	썻
U+414x	쎂	쎅	쎋	쎔	쎕	쎗	쎘	쎙	쎝	쎠	쎡	쎤	쎧	쎨	쎰	쎱
U+415x	쎳	쎴	쎵	쎼	쎽	쏌	쏍	쏏	쏐	쏑	쏫	쏱	쏻	쏼	쐄	쐅
U+416x	쐇	쐉	쐑	쐔	쐗	쐘	쐣	쐭	쐳	쐿	쑀	쑁	쑉	쑌	쑏	쑐
U+417x	쑘	쑙	쑛	쑝	쑫	쑷	쑾	쒁	쒄	쒇	쒈	쒐	쒑	쒓	쒕	쒝
U+418x	쒠	쒣	쒤	쒬	쒭	쒯	쒰	쒱	쒹	쒿	쓀	쓈	쓉	쓋	쓍	쓓
U+419x	쓔	쓕	쓘	쓛	쓜	쓤	쓥	쓧	쓷	씃	씅	씍	씝	씟	씡	씯
U+41Ax	씱	씼	씿	앀	앃	앋	앏	앒	앖	앚	앛	앟	앧	앹	앺	앾
U+41Bx	얃	얐	얒	얔	얙	얟	얨	얫	얬	얭	얶	얺	얿	엏	엗	엤
U+41Cx	엩	엪	엱	엳	엸	옄	옉	옏	옝	옠	옦	옪	옫	옯	옲	옺
U+41Dx	옽	옾	왇	왘	왙	왣	왤	왭	왰	왿	욂	욌	욒	욛	욝	욬
U+41Ex	욷	욼	웂	웆	웇	웉	웒	웓	웟	웤	웥	웯	웻	웼	윁	윋
U+41Fx	윎	윓	윘	윜	윝	윧	윶	윸	윹	읃	읅	읆	읇	읎	읙	읟
U+420x	읦	읩	읭	읻	잀	잂	잆	잋	잌	잍	잏	잓	잙	잧	잩	잪
U+421x	잫	잲	잳	쟂	쟏	쟙	쟛	쟫	쟴	쟵	쟷	쟹	젂	젆	젇	젉
U+422x	젔	젙	젛	젣	젰	젲	젹	젿	졁	졂	졃	졇	졋	졎	졑	졓
U+423x	졕	졘	졜	졤	졥	졧	졩	졷	좐	좒	좓	좕	좜	좠	좩	좬
U+424x	좯	좰	좸	좻	죅	죋	죘	죧	죨	죰	죱	죳	죻	줃	줈	줗
U+425x	줙	줜	줟	줠	줨	줩	줫	줭	줵	줸	줻	줼	쥄	쥅	쥇	쥈
U+426x	쥉	쥗	쥥	쥭	쥽	쥿	즁	즏	즑	즒	즔	즞	즤	즥	즨	즬
U+427x	즴	즵	즷	즹	짏	짒	짔	짗	짛	짞	짣	짨	짷	짿	쨕	쨚
U+428x	쨜	쨤	쨥	쨧	쨭	쨰	쩓	쩗	쩘	쩛	쩧	쩩	쩬	쩯	쩰	쩸
U+429x	쩹	쩻	쩼	쪁	쪅	쪈	쪋	쪌	쪔	쪕	쪗	쪙	쪠	쪡	쪤	쪨
U+42Ax	쪰	쪱	쪳	쪵	쪾	쫃	쫆	쫒	쫗	쫜	쫟	쫨	쫩	쫫	쫭	쫵
U+42Bx	쫸	쫻	쫼	쬑	쬗	쬣	쬤	쬥	쬧	쬬	쬭	쬰	쬴	쬼	쬽	쬿
U+42Cx	쭊	쭏	쭒	쭛	쭥	쭨	쭫	쭬	쭴	쭵	쭷	쮀	쮁	쮄	쮇	쮈
U+42Dx	쮐	쮑	쮓	쮕	쮝	쮠	쮣	쮤	쮬	쮭	쮯	쮱	쮹	쮼	쯀	쯈
U+42Ex	쯉	쯋	쯍	쯕	쯘	쯛	쯜	쯥	쯪	쯰	쯱	쯴	쯸	찀	찁	찃
U+42Fx	찅	찆	찓	찟	찦	찯	찱	찿	챂	챋	챛	챞	챡	챱	챳	챺
U+430x	챼	첑	첟	첧	첮	첲	첻	쳃	쳈	쳑	쳗	쳘	쳠	쳡	쳣	쳥
U+431x	쳭	쳴	쳼	쳽	쳿	촏	촥	촫	촴	촵	촷	쵀	쵓	쵔	쵝	쵣
U+432x	쵰	쵹	쵼	춀	춉	춋	춍	춛	춱	춴	춷	춸	췀	췁	췃	췅
U+433x	췍	췔	췜	췝	췟	췠	췡	췩	췯	츅	츕	츗	츧	츩	츬	츼
U+434x	츽	칀	칄	칌	칍	칏	칑	칢	칬	칮	칰	칲	칻	캈	캍	캎
U+435x	캗	캩	캪	캰	캴	캼	캽	캿	컈	컌	컻	컽	컾	켇	켔	켙
U+436x	켚	켝	켣	켹	켼	콀	콈	콉	콋	콌	콍	콛	콪	콮	쾁	쾃
U+437x	쾍	쾐	쾓	쾔	쾜	쾝	쾟	쾩	쾬	쾸	쾹	쾻	쾽	쿅	쿈	쿌
U+438x	쿔	쿕	쿗	쿙	쿧	쿺	쿽	퀃	퀌	퀍	퀐	퀙	퀜	퀠	퀨	퀩
U+439x	퀫	퀬	퀻	큑	큡	큣	큥	큨	큲	큶	큿	킈	킉	킌	킐	킘
U+43Ax	킙	킛	킝	킫	킸	킾	탇	탊	탏	탚	탢	탣	탥	탶	탹	탼
U+43Bx	턀	턈	턉	턋	턔	턘	턚	턷	턹	턻	텓	텠	텦	텩	텯	텰
U+43Cx	텸	텹	텻	텽	톅	톌	톔	톗	톙	톧	톷	톸	톹	톽	퇄	퇌
U+43Dx	퇍	퇏	퇑	퇬	퇭	퇵	퇻	퇼	툄	툅	툈	툑	툔	툘	툠	툡
U+43Ex	툣	툥	툳	툶	퉉	퉌	퉏	퉐	퉔	퉘	퉙	퉛	퉝	퉥	퉨	퉫
U+43Fx	퉬	퉴	퉵	퉷	퉸	퉹	튇	튓	튝	튭	튯	튻	틁	틄	틍	틕
U+440x	틠	틧	틩	틷	팈	팊	팓	팣	팦	팯	퍁	퍈	퍌	퍔	퍕	퍗
U+441x	퍙	퍠	펃	펎	펕	펟	펬	펲	펵	펹	펻	폇	폑	폔	폗	폠
U+442x	폥	폮	폳	퐄	퐅	퐆	퐉	퐌	퐐	퐘	퐙	퐛	퐤	푁	푈	푐
U+443x	푑	푓	푕	푝	푣	푬	푱	풕	풘	풛	풜	풤	풥	풧	풨	풰
U+444x	풱	풴	풸	퓀	퓁	퓃	퓅	퓍	퓝	퓡	퓩	퓯	퓹	픅	픋	픐
U+445x	픙	픠	픡	픤	픨	픰	픱	픳	픵	핃	핕	핖	핟	핡	핣	핤
U+446x	핧	핬	핮	핱	핻	햍	햑	햔	햘	햠	햡	햣	햫	햬	헀	헏
U+447x	헑	헗	헜	헡	헢	헫	헸	헾	혇	혝	혬	혯	혰	혱	혽	혿
U+448x	홁	홄	홇	홛	홠	홤	홥	홦	홨	홷	홸	횀	횁	횄	횓	횜
U+449x	횩	횯	횸	횽	훋	훍	훎	훒	훓	훕	훜	훝	훡	훱	훳	훴
U+44Ax	휃	휌	휍	휏	휐	휟	휺	휻	흃	흅	흍	흕	흝	흟	흨	흪
U+44Bx	흫	흭	흳	흿	힏	힗	힜	힠								
Notes 1.As of Unicode version 1.1. Characters in chart are shown by means of equivalent code points in Unicode 2.0 and all subsequent versions. 2.Grey areas indicate points outside of the block, since its boundaries (unusually) were not aligned to multiples of 16.

== Hangul Supplementary-B block ==
Hangul Supplementary-B
- Range: U+44B8..U+4DFF (2,376 code points)
- Plane: BMP
- Scripts: Hangul
- Status: Deleted prior to the release of Unicode 2.0
- Now occupied by: CJK Unified Ideographs Extension A; Yijing Hexagram Symbols
- Source standards: GB 12052-89 (U+44B8–U+44BD only)

Unicode Version History
- 1.1 (1993): 2,376 (+2,376)
- 2.0 (1996): 0 (-2376)
- Note: Block deleted in Unicode 2.0, with characters moved to Hangul Syllables block.

Hangul Supplementary-B (U+44B8–U+4DFF) consisted of six syllables from GB 12052-89 (U+44B8–U+44BD) and the first 2,370 syllables that are not in the aforementioned three sets (U+44BE–U+4DFF).

Hangul Supplementary-B^{[1]}^{[2]} References:
	0	1	2	3	4	5	6	7	8	9	A	B	C	D	E	F
U+44Bx									믃	혻	뽙	뿥	쮔	웘	갃	갅
U+44Cx	갆	갍	갎	갏	갘	갞	갟	갡	갥	갦	갧	갨	갩	갪	갫	갮
U+44Dx	갳	갴	갷	갺	갻	갽	갾	걂	걃	걄	걅	걆	걊	걎	걏	걐
U+44Ex	걑	걒	걓	걕	걖	걗	걙	걚	걛	걝	걞	걟	걠	걡	걢	걣
U+44Fx	걦	걧	걨	걩	걪	걫	걬	걭	걮	걯	걲	걶	걻	걼	걽	걾
U+450x	걿	겂	겈	겎	겏	겑	겒	겕	겖	겗	겘	겙	겚	겛	겞	겢
U+451x	겣	겤	겦	겫	겭	겮	겲	겳	겵	겶	겺	곀	곃	곆	곇	곉
U+452x	곊	곍	곎	곏	곐	곑	곒	곓	곖	곚	곛	곜	곝	곞	곟	곢
U+453x	곣	곥	곦	곭	곲	곴	곸	곾	곿	괁	괂	괅	괇	괈	괉	괊
U+454x	괋	괎	괒	괓	괔	괕	괖	괗	괚	괛	괝	괞	괡	괣	괤	괥
U+455x	괦	괧	괪	괮	괯	괰	괱	괲	괳	괶	괷	괹	괺	괽	괿	굀
U+456x	굁	굂	굃	굆	굊	굋	굌	굍	굎	굏	굒	굓	굕	굖	굙	굚
U+457x	굛	굜	굝	굞	굟	굢	굤	굦	굧	굨	굩	굪	굫	굮	굯	굱
U+458x	굲	굷	굹	굺	굾	궀	궄	궅	궇	궊	궋	궍	궎	궑	궒	궓
U+459x	궔	궕	궖	궗	궘	궚	궞	궟	궠	궡	궢	궣	궦	궧	궩	궪
U+45Ax	궭	궮	궯	궰	궱	궲	궳	궶	궺	궻	궼	궽	궾	궿	귂	귃
U+45Bx	귅	귆	귉	귋	귌	귍	귎	귏	귒	귖	귗	귘	귙	귚	귛	귞
U+45Cx	귟	귡	귢	귣	귥	귦	귧	귩	귪	귫	귮	귰	귲	귳	귴	귵
U+45Dx	귶	귷	귺	귻	귽	긅	긆	긊	긌	긐	긖	긗	긙	긚	긛	긝
U+45Ex	긞	긟	긡	긢	긣	긦	긨	긪	긫	긬	긭	긮	긯	긲	긳	긵
U+45Fx	긶	긻	긽	긾	긿	깂	깈	깏	깑	깒	깕	깗	깘	깙	깚	깛
U+460x	깞	깤	깦	깧	깫	깭	깮	깱	깲	깴	깵	깷	깺	깾	깿	꺀
U+461x	꺂	꺃	꺆	꺇	꺉	꺊	꺎	꺏	꺐	꺑	꺒	꺓	꺔	꺕	꺖	꺘
U+462x	꺚	꺛	꺜	꺝	꺞	꺟	꺡	꺢	꺣	꺤	꺥	꺦	꺧	꺨	꺩	꺪
U+463x	꺫	꺬	꺭	꺮	꺯	꺰	꺱	꺲	꺳	꺴	꺶	꺷	꺸	꺹	꺺	꺻
U+464x	꺿	껁	껅	껆	껇	껈	껉	껊	껋	껎	껔	껖	껗	껛	껝	껞
U+465x	껡	껢	껣	껤	껥	껦	껧	껪	껮	껯	껰	껲	껳	껶	껷	껹
U+466x	껺	껽	껾	껿	꼀	꼁	꼂	꼃	꼆	꼊	꼋	꼌	꼎	꼏	꼑	꼒
U+467x	꼓	꼔	꼕	꼖	꼘	꼙	꼚	꼛	꼜	꼝	꼞	꼟	꼠	꼡	꼢	꼣
U+468x	꼤	꼦	꼧	꼨	꼩	꼪	꼫	꼮	꼯	꼱	꼵	꼷	꼹	꼺	꼾	꽀
U+469x	꽄	꽆	꽊	꽋	꽍	꽎	꽑	꽒	꽓	꽔	꽕	꽖	꽗	꽚	꽞	꽟
U+46Ax	꽠	꽡	꽢	꽣	꽦	꽧	꽩	꽪	꽭	꽮	꽯	꽰	꽱	꽲	꽳	꽶
U+46Bx	꽷	꽺	꽻	꽼	꽽	꽾	꽿	꾂	꾃	꾅	꾆	꾉	꾊	꾋	꾌	꾍
U+46Cx	꾎	꾏	꾒	꾖	꾗	꾘	꾙	꾚	꾛	꾝	꾞	꾟	꾡	꾢	꾥	꾦
U+46Dx	꾧	꾨	꾩	꾪	꾫	꾮	꾯	꾰	꾱	꾳	꾴	꾵	꾶	꾷	꾺	꾻
U+46Ex	꾽	꾾	꿂	꿃	꿄	꿅	꿆	꿊	꿌	꿐	꿑	꿒	꿓	꿖	꿗	꿙
U+46Fx	꿚	꿝	꿞	꿟	꿠	꿡	꿢	꿣	꿥	꿦	꿪	꿫	꿬	꿭	꿮	꿯
U+470x	꿲	꿳	꿵	꿶	꿹	꿺	꿻	꿼	꿽	꿾	꿿	뀂	뀆	뀇	뀈	뀉
U+471x	뀊	뀋	뀎	뀏	뀑	뀒	뀕	뀖	뀗	뀘	뀙	뀚	뀛	뀞	뀠	뀢
U+472x	뀣	뀤	뀥	뀦	뀧	뀩	뀪	뀫	뀭	뀮	뀯	뀱	뀲	뀳	뀴	뀵
U+473x	뀶	뀷	뀺	뀻	뀼	뀽	뀾	뀿	끀	끁	끂	끃	끆	끇	끉	끏
U+474x	끐	끑	끒	끖	끘	끚	끜	끞	끢	끣	끤	끥	끦	끩	끪	끬
U+475x	끭	끮	끯	끰	끱	끲	끴	끶	끷	끸	끹	끺	끻	끾	끿	낁
U+476x	낂	낅	낆	낇	낈	낉	낊	낎	낒	낓	낔	낖	낗	낝	낞	낣
U+477x	낥	낦	낧	낶	낷	낹	낺	낽	낾	낿	냀	냁	냂	냃	냆	냊
U+478x	냋	냌	냍	냏	냒	냓	냕	냖	냙	냚	냛	냜	냝	냞	냟	냢
U+479x	냤	냧	냨	냪	냫	냭	냮	냯	냰	냱	냲	냳	냴	냵	냶	냷
U+47Ax	냸	냹	냺	냻	냼	냽	냾	냿	넀	넂	넃	넄	넅	넆	넇	넍
U+47Bx	넎	넑	넔	넕	넖	넚	넟	넦	넧	넩	넪	넭	넮	넯	넰	넱
U+47Cx	넲	넳	넶	넺	넻	녂	녅	녆	녉	녊	녌	녍	녎	녏	녒	녖
U+47Dx	녗	녞	녟	녡	녢	녥	녦	녧	녨	녩	녪	녫	녮	녰	녲	녳
U+47Ex	녴	녵	녶	녷	녽	놁	놃	놄	놅	놆	놇	놊	놌	놏	놖	놗
U+47Fx	놙	놚	놝	놞	놟	놠	놡	놢	놣	놦	놪	놫	놬	놭	놮	놯
U+480x	놱	놲	놳	놵	놶	놷	놹	놺	놻	놼	놽	놾	놿	뇀	뇁	뇂
U+481x	뇃	뇅	뇆	뇇	뇈	뇉	뇊	뇋	뇎	뇏	뇑	뇒	뇕	뇖	뇗	뇘
U+482x	뇙	뇚	뇛	뇞	뇢	뇣	뇤	뇥	뇧	뇪	뇫	뇭	뇮	뇱	뇲	뇳
U+483x	뇴	뇵	뇶	뇷	뇺	뇼	뇾	뇿	눀	눁	눂	눃	눆	눇	눉	눊
U+484x	눎	눏	눑	눒	눖	눘	눚	눜	눝	눟	눢	눣	눥	눦	눩	눪
U+485x	눫	눬	눭	눮	눯	눲	눶	눷	눸	눹	눺	눻	눾	눿	뉁	뉂
U+486x	뉅	뉆	뉇	뉈	뉉	뉊	뉋	뉎	뉒	뉓	뉔	뉕	뉖	뉗	뉚	뉛
U+487x	뉝	뉞	뉡	뉢	뉣	뉤	뉥	뉦	뉧	뉪	뉬	뉮	뉰	뉱	뉲	뉳
U+488x	뉶	뉷	뉹	뉺	뉽	뉾	뉿	늀	늁	늂	늃	늆	늈	늌	늍	늎
U+489x	늏	늒	늓	늕	늖	늛	늝	늞	늟	늢	늤	늨	늩	늮	늯	늱
U+48Ax	늲	늵	늶	늷	늸	늹	늺	늻	늾	닂	닃	닄	닅	닆	닇	닊
U+48Bx	닋	닍	닎	닕	닖	닗	닚	닜	닟	닡	닧	닩	닪	닱	닾	댂
U+48Cx	댃	댅	댆	댉	댊	댋	댌	댍	댎	댏	댒	댖	댗	댘	댚	댛
U+48Dx	댞	댟	댡	댢	댣	댥	댦	댨	댩	댪	댫	댮	댰	댲	댳	댴
U+48Ex	댵	댶	댷	댹	댺	댻	댽	댾	댿	덀	덁	덂	덃	덄	덅	덆
U+48Fx	덇	덈	덉	덊	덋	덌	덎	덏	덐	덑	덒	덓	덗	덚	덝	덠
U+490x	덡	덢	덣	덬	덲	덳	덵	덶	덹	덺	덻	덼	덽	덾	덿	뎂
U+491x	뎇	뎈	뎉	뎋	뎎	뎑	뎒	뎕	뎖	뎗	뎙	뎚	뎛	뎞	뎢	뎣
U+492x	뎤	뎥	뎦	뎧	뎪	뎫	뎭	뎮	뎯	뎱	뎲	뎳	뎴	뎵	뎶	뎷
U+493x	뎺	뎼	뎾	뎿	돀	돁	돂	돃	돉	돊	돍	돑	돒	돖	돘	돢
U+494x	돣	돥	돦	돧	돩	돪	돫	돬	돭	돮	돯	돲	돶	돷	돸	돹
U+495x	돺	돻	돽	돾	돿	됁	됂	됅	됆	됇	됈	됉	됊	됋	됎	됑
U+496x	됒	됓	됔	됕	됖	됗	됚	됛	됝	됞	됡	됢	됣	됥	됦	됧
U+497x	됪	됮	됯	됰	됱	됲	됳	됶	됷	됹	됺	됽	됾	됿	둀	둁
U+498x	둂	둃	둆	둈	둊	둋	둌	둍	둎	둒	둓	둕	둖	둜	둝	둞
U+499x	둟	둢	둤	둦	둧	둨	둩	둫	둮	둯	둱	둲	둵	둶	둷	둸
U+49Ax	둹	둺	둻	둾	뒂	뒃	뒄	뒅	뒆	뒇	뒊	뒋	뒍	뒎	뒑	뒒
U+49Bx	뒓	뒔	뒕	뒖	뒗	뒚	뒞	뒟	뒠	뒡	뒢	뒣	뒦	뒧	뒩	뒪
U+49Cx	뒭	뒮	뒯	뒰	뒱	뒲	뒳	뒶	뒺	뒻	뒼	뒽	뒾	뒿	듂	듃
U+49Dx	듅	듆	듇	듉	듊	듋	듌	듍	듎	듏	듒	듔	듖	듗	듘	듙
U+49Ex	듚	듛	듞	듟	듡	듢	듩	듪	듫	듮	듰	듲	듳	듴	듵	듶
U+49Fx	듷	듺	듻	듽	듾	딁	딂	딃	딄	딅	딆	딇	딊	딌	딎	딏
U+4A0x	딐	딑	딒	딓	딖	딗	딙	딚	딝	딞	딟	딠	딡	딢	딣	딦
U+4A1x	딬	딳	딵	딶	딼	딽	딾	땂	땆	땇	땈	땉	땊	땏	땑	땒
U+4A2x	땕	땖	땗	땘	땙	땚	땛	땞	땢	땣	땤	땥	땦	땪	땫	땭
U+4A3x	땮	땯	땰	땱	땲	땳	땴	땵	땶	땷	땸	땹	땺	땻	땼	땾
U+4A4x	땿	떀	떁	떂	떃	떅	떆	떇	떉	떊	떋	떌	떍	떎	떏	떐
U+4A5x	떑	떒	떓	떔	떕	떖	떗	떘	떙	떚	떛	떜	떝	떞	떟	떢
U+4A6x	떣	떥	떦	떩	떬	떭	떮	떲	떶	떷	떸	떹	떺	떾	떿	뗁
U+4A7x	뗂	뗅	뗆	뗇	뗈	뗉	뗊	뗋	뗎	뗒	뗓	뗔	뗕	뗖	뗗	뗚
U+4A8x	뗛	뗝	뗞	뗠	뗡	뗢	뗣	뗤	뗥	뗦	뗧	뗪	뗮	뗯	뗰	뗱
U+4A9x	뗲	뗳	뗵	뗶	뗷	뗹	뗺	뗻	뗼	뗽	뗾	뗿	똀	똁	똂	똃
U+4AAx	똄	똆	똇	똈	똉	똊	똋	똌	똍	똎	똏	똓	똕	똖	똛	똜
U+4ABx	똝	똞	똢	똤	똦	똧	똨	똩	똪	똫	똮	똯	똱	똲	똳	똵
U+4ACx	똶	똷	똸	똹	똺	똻	똼	똽	똾	똿	뙀	뙂	뙃	뙄	뙅	뙆
U+4ADx	뙇	뙊	뙋	뙍	뙎	뙑	뙒	뙓	뙔	뙕	뙖	뙗	뙚	뙝	뙞	뙟
U+4AEx	뙠	뙡	뙢	뙣	뙦	뙧	뙩	뙪	뙭	뙮	뙯	뙰	뙱	뙲	뙳	뙶
U+4AFx	뙺	뙻	뙼	뙽	뙾	뙿	뚂	뚃	뚄	뚅	뚆	뚇	뚈	뚉	뚊	뚋
U+4B0x	뚌	뚍	뚎	뚏	뚐	뚑	뚒	뚓	뚔	뚕	뚖	뚗	뚘	뚙	뚚	뚛
U+4B1x	뚞	뚟	뚡	뚢	뚥	뚨	뚩	뚪	뚮	뚰	뚲	뚳	뚴	뚶	뚷	뚹
U+4B2x	뚺	뚻	뚽	뚾	뛀	뛁	뛂	뛃	뛄	뛅	뛆	뛇	뛈	뛉	뛊	뛌
U+4B3x	뛍	뛎	뛏	뛐	뛑	뛒	뛓	뛕	뛖	뛗	뛙	뛚	뛝	뛞	뛟	뛠
U+4B4x	뛡	뛢	뛣	뛦	뛧	뛪	뛫	뛬	뛭	뛮	뛯	뛱	뛲	뛳	뛵	뛶
U+4B5x	뛹	뛺	뛻	뛼	뛽	뛾	뛿	뜂	뜄	뜆	뜇	뜈	뜉	뜊	뜋	뜎
U+4B6x	뜏	뜐	뜑	뜒	뜓	뜕	뜖	뜗	뜘	뜙	뜚	뜛	뜝	뜞	뜟	뜠
U+4B7x	뜢	뜣	뜤	뜥	뜦	뜧	뜪	뜫	뜭	뜮	뜱	뜴	뜵	뜶	뜺	뜼
U+4B8x	뜾	뜿	띀	띁	띂	띃	띅	띆	띇	띉	띊	띋	띍	띎	띏	띐
U+4B9x	띑	띒	띓	띖	띗	띘	띚	띛	띜	띝	띞	띟	띢	띣	띥	띦
U+4BAx	띩	띪	띫	띬	띭	띮	띯	띲	띴	띶	띷	띸	띹	띺	띾	띿
U+4BBx	랁	랂	랅	랆	랇	랉	랊	랋	랎	랚	랛	랝	랞	랡	랢	랣
U+4BCx	랤	랥	랦	랧	랪	랮	랯	랳	랶	랷	랹	랺	랽	랾	랿	럀
U+4BDx	럁	럂	럃	럆	럈	럊	럋	럌	럍	럎	럏	럑	럒	럓	럔	럕
U+4BEx	럖	럗	럘	럙	럚	럛	럜	럝	럞	럟	럠	럡	럢	럤	럥	럦
U+4BFx	럧	럨	럩	럪	럫	럮	럯	럱	럵	럶	럷	럸	럹	럺	럻	렃
U+4C0x	렅	렊	렋	렍	렎	렑	렒	렓	렔	렕	렖	렗	렚	렞	렟	렠
U+4C1x	렦	렧	렩	렪	렭	렮	렯	렱	렲	렳	렶	렺	렻	렽	렿	롂
U+4C2x	롃	롅	롆	롉	롊	롋	롌	롍	롎	롏	롒	롔	롖	롗	롘	롙
U+4C3x	롚	롛	롞	롟	롡	롢	롥	롦	롧	롩	롪	롮	롰	롲	롳	롵
U+4C4x	롺	롻	롽	롾	롿	뢁	뢂	뢃	뢄	뢅	뢆	뢇	뢊	뢎	뢏	뢐
U+4C5x	뢑	뢒	뢓	뢕	뢖	뢗	뢙	뢚	뢝	뢞	뢟	뢠	뢡	뢢	뢣	뢤
U+4C6x	뢥	뢦	뢩	뢪	뢫	뢬	뢭	뢮	뢯	뢲	뢳	뢶	뢹	뢺	뢻	뢼
U+4C7x	뢽	뢾	뢿	룂	룆	룇	룈	룉	룊	룋	룎	룏	룑	룒	룕	룖
U+4C8x	룗	룘	룙	룚	룛	룞	룠	룢	룣	룤	룥	룦	룧	룪	룫	룭
U+4C9x	룮	룱	룲	룴	룵	룶	룷	룺	룼	룾	룿	뤁	뤃	뤆	뤇	뤉
U+4CAx	뤊	뤍	뤎	뤏	뤐	뤑	뤒	뤓	뤖	뤚	뤛	뤜	뤝	뤞	뤟	뤢
U+4CBx	뤣	뤥	뤦	뤧	뤩	뤪	뤫	뤬	뤭	뤮	뤯	뤲	뤶	뤷	뤸	뤹
U+4CCx	뤺	뤻	뤾	뤿	륁	륂	륅	륆	륇	륈	륉	륊	륋	륎	륒	륓
U+4CDx	륔	륕	륖	륗	륚	륛	륝	륞	륡	륢	륣	륤	륥	륦	륧	륪
U+4CEx	륬	륮	륯	륰	륱	륲	륳	륶	륷	륹	륺	륾	륿	릁	릂	릃
U+4CFx	릆	릈	릌	릒	릓	릕	릖	릗	릙	릚	릛	릜	릝	릟	릢	릤
U+4D0x	릦	릧	릨	릩	릪	릫	릮	릯	릱	릲	릵	릶	릷	릸	릹	릺
U+4D1x	릻	맂	맃	맅	맇	맋	맍	맓	맕	맖	맗	맚	맦	맧	맩	맪
U+4D2x	맮	맯	맰	맱	맲	맳	맶	맼	맿	먂	먃	먅	먆	먇	먉	먊
U+4D3x	먋	먌	먍	먎	먏	먒	먔	먖	먗	먙	먚	먛	먝	먞	먟	먠
U+4D4x	먡	먢	먣	먤	먥	먦	먧	먨	먩	먪	먫	먬	먭	먮	먯	먰
U+4D5x	먱	먲	먳	먴	먵	먶	먷	먺	먽	먾	멃	멄	멅	멆	멇	멊
U+4D6x	멐	멑	멒	멖	멗	멙	멚	멝	멞	멟	멡	멢	멣	멦	멬	멮
U+4D7x	멯	멲	멳	멵	멶	멹	멻	멼	멽	멾	멿	몂	몆	몈	몊	몋
U+4D8x	몎	몏	몑	몒	몕	몖	몗	몘	몙	몚	몛	몞	몠	몢	몤	몧
U+4D9x	몪	몭	몮	몳	몵	몶	몷	몺	몼	몾	뫀	뫁	뫂	뫆	뫇	뫉
U+4DAx	뫊	뫍	뫎	뫏	뫐	뫑	뫒	뫓	뫖	뫚	뫛	뫜	뫝	뫞	뫟	뫡
U+4DBx	뫢	뫣	뫥	뫦	뫧	뫩	뫪	뫫	뫬	뫭	뫮	뫯	뫰	뫲	뫳	뫵
U+4DCx	뫶	뫷	뫸	뫹	뫺	뫻	뫾	뫿	묁	묂	묅	묆	묇	묈	묉	묊
U+4DDx	묋	묎	묐	묒	묓	묔	묕	묖	묗	묚	묛	묝	묞	묡	묢	묣
U+4DEx	묤	묥	묦	묧	묪	묬	묮	묯	묰	묱	묲	묳	묷	묹	묿	뭁
U+4DFx	뭂	뭃	뭆	뭈	뭊	뭌	뭎	뭒	뭓	뭕	뭖	뭙	뭚	뭛	뭜	뭝
Notes 1.As of Unicode version 1.1. Characters in chart are shown by means of equivalent code points in Unicode 2.0 and all subsequent versions. 2.Grey areas indicate points outside of the block, since its boundaries (unusually) were not aligned to multiples of 16.

== See also ==
- Tibetan (obsolete Unicode block) (the only other obsolete Unicode block)
