= List of modern Hangul characters in ISO/IEC 2022–compliant national character set standards =

This is the list of modern Hangul characters in ISO/IEC 2022–compliant national character set standards.

- South Korea: KS X 1001 (formerly KS C 5601) and KS X 1002 (formerly KS C 5657)
- North Korea: KPS 9566
- China: GB 12052

Note: In the tables below, the "KPS 9566" column excludes Hangul characters that are not in the EUC range ([\xA1-\xFE][\xA1-\xFE]) and the duplicate syllables for the names of the former and current leaders of North Korea.

== Jamo (consonant and vowel elements) ==
51 characters in total.

Note: KS X 1002 is a supplementary character set for KS X 1001. As all modern Hangul jamo characters are already in KS X 1001, none are in KS X 1002.

Char.	Unicode	KS X 1001	KPS 9566	GB 12052
ㄱ	U+3131	04-01	04-01	16-01
ㄲ	U+3132	04-02	04-15	31-24
ㄳ	U+3133	04-03	04-41	16-02
ㄴ	U+3134	04-04	04-02	17-63
ㄵ	U+3135	04-05	04-42	17-64
ㄶ	U+3136	04-06	04-43	17-65
ㄷ	U+3137	04-07	04-03	18-93
ㄸ	U+3138	04-08	04-16	32-43
ㄹ	U+3139	04-09	04-04	20-23
ㄺ	U+313A	04-10	04-44	20-24
ㄻ	U+313B	04-11	04-45	20-25
ㄼ	U+313C	04-12	04-46	20-26
ㄽ	U+313D	04-13	04-47	20-27
ㄾ	U+313E	04-14	04-48	20-28
ㄿ	U+313F	04-15	04-49	20-29
ㅀ	U+3140	04-16	04-50	20-30
ㅁ	U+3141	04-17	04-05	21-36
ㅂ	U+3142	04-18	04-06	22-54
ㅃ	U+3143	04-19	04-17	33-32
ㅄ	U+3144	04-20	04-51	22-55
ㅅ	U+3145	04-21	04-07	23-74
ㅆ	U+3146	04-22	04-18	34-05
ㅇ	U+3147	04-23	04-08	35-79
ㅈ	U+3148	04-24	04-09	25-20
ㅉ	U+3149	04-25	04-19	34-90
ㅊ	U+314A	04-26	04-10	26-43
ㅋ	U+314B	04-27	04-11	27-27
ㅌ	U+314C	04-28	04-12	28-20
ㅍ	U+314D	04-29	04-13	29-14
ㅎ	U+314E	04-30	04-14	29-88
ㅏ	U+314F	04-31	04-20	35-80
ㅐ	U+3150	04-32	04-30	37-24
ㅑ	U+3151	04-33	04-21	36-02
ㅒ	U+3152	04-34	04-31	37-31
ㅓ	U+3153	04-35	04-22	36-14
ㅔ	U+3154	04-36	04-32	37-35
ㅕ	U+3155	04-37	04-23	36-33
ㅖ	U+3156	04-38	04-33	37-43
ㅗ	U+3157	04-39	04-24	36-51
ㅘ	U+3158	04-40	04-37	37-67
ㅙ	U+3159	04-41	04-39	37-83
ㅚ	U+315A	04-42	04-34	37-50
ㅛ	U+315B	04-43	04-25	36-65
ㅜ	U+315C	04-44	04-26	36-70
ㅝ	U+315D	04-45	04-38	37-75
ㅞ	U+315E	04-46	04-40	37-88
ㅟ	U+315F	04-47	04-35	37-58
ㅠ	U+3160	04-48	04-27	36-80
ㅡ	U+3161	04-49	04-28	36-87
ㅢ	U+3162	04-50	04-36	37-65
ㅣ	U+3163	04-51	04-29	37-10

== Syllables ==
- KS X 1001: 2,350 characters
- KS X 1002: 1,930 characters
- KPS 9566: 2,679 characters
- GB 12052: 3,373 characters (2,017 in level 1 (rows 16–37) and 1,356 in level 2 (rows 38–52))
- Union of the above: 4,300 characters

Note: In the "Decomp." column, the "∅" character denotes the empty final.

Char.	Unicode	KS X 1001	KS X 1002	KPS 9566	GB 12052	Decomp.
가	U+AC00	16-01	—	16-01	16-03	ᄀ+ᅡ+∅
각	U+AC01	16-02	—	16-02	16-04	ᄀ+ᅡ+ᆨ
갂	U+AC02	—	16-01	—	—	ᄀ+ᅡ+ᆩ
갃	U+AC03	—	—	—	38-01	ᄀ+ᅡ+ᆪ
간	U+AC04	16-03	—	16-03	16-05	ᄀ+ᅡ+ᆫ
갇	U+AC07	16-04	—	16-04	16-06	ᄀ+ᅡ+ᆮ
갈	U+AC08	16-05	—	16-05	16-07	ᄀ+ᅡ+ᆯ
갉	U+AC09	16-06	—	16-06	16-08	ᄀ+ᅡ+ᆰ
갊	U+AC0A	16-07	—	16-07	16-09	ᄀ+ᅡ+ᆱ
갋	U+AC0B	—	16-02	—	38-02	ᄀ+ᅡ+ᆲ
갌	U+AC0C	—	16-03	—	38-03	ᄀ+ᅡ+ᆳ
감	U+AC10	16-08	—	16-08	16-10	ᄀ+ᅡ+ᆷ
갑	U+AC11	16-09	—	16-09	16-11	ᄀ+ᅡ+ᆸ
값	U+AC12	16-10	—	16-10	16-12	ᄀ+ᅡ+ᆹ
갓	U+AC13	16-11	—	16-11	16-13	ᄀ+ᅡ+ᆺ
갔	U+AC14	16-12	—	16-18	16-20	ᄀ+ᅡ+ᆻ
강	U+AC15	16-13	—	16-12	16-14	ᄀ+ᅡ+ᆼ
갖	U+AC16	16-14	—	16-13	16-15	ᄀ+ᅡ+ᆽ
갗	U+AC17	16-15	—	16-14	16-16	ᄀ+ᅡ+ᆾ
같	U+AC19	16-16	—	16-15	16-17	ᄀ+ᅡ+ᇀ
갚	U+AC1A	16-17	—	16-16	16-18	ᄀ+ᅡ+ᇁ
갛	U+AC1B	16-18	—	16-17	16-19	ᄀ+ᅡ+ᇂ
개	U+AC1C	16-19	—	17-22	17-11	ᄀ+ᅢ+∅
객	U+AC1D	16-20	—	17-23	17-12	ᄀ+ᅢ+ᆨ
갠	U+AC20	16-21	—	17-24	17-13	ᄀ+ᅢ+ᆫ
갢	U+AC22	—	16-04	—	38-40	ᄀ+ᅢ+ᆭ
갣	U+AC23	—	16-05	—	38-41	ᄀ+ᅢ+ᆮ
갤	U+AC24	16-22	—	17-25	17-14	ᄀ+ᅢ+ᆯ
갬	U+AC2C	16-23	—	17-26	17-15	ᄀ+ᅢ+ᆷ
갭	U+AC2D	16-24	—	17-27	17-16	ᄀ+ᅢ+ᆸ
갯	U+AC2F	16-25	—	17-28	17-17	ᄀ+ᅢ+ᆺ
갰	U+AC30	16-26	—	17-30	38-42	ᄀ+ᅢ+ᆻ
갱	U+AC31	16-27	—	17-29	17-18	ᄀ+ᅢ+ᆼ
갲	U+AC32	—	16-06	—	—	ᄀ+ᅢ+ᆽ
갵	U+AC35	—	16-07	—	—	ᄀ+ᅢ+ᇀ
갶	U+AC36	—	16-08	—	—	ᄀ+ᅢ+ᇁ
갸	U+AC38	16-28	—	16-19	16-21	ᄀ+ᅣ+∅
갹	U+AC39	16-29	—	16-20	38-04	ᄀ+ᅣ+ᆨ
갼	U+AC3C	16-30	—	16-21	—	ᄀ+ᅣ+ᆫ
갿	U+AC3F	—	16-09	—	38-05	ᄀ+ᅣ+ᆮ
걀	U+AC40	16-31	—	16-22	16-22	ᄀ+ᅣ+ᆯ
걁	U+AC41	—	16-10	—	—	ᄀ+ᅣ+ᆰ
걇	U+AC47	—	16-11	—	—	ᄀ+ᅣ+ᆶ
걈	U+AC48	—	16-12	16-23	38-06	ᄀ+ᅣ+ᆷ
걉	U+AC49	—	16-13	—	—	ᄀ+ᅣ+ᆸ
걋	U+AC4B	16-32	—	16-24	38-07	ᄀ+ᅣ+ᆺ
걌	U+AC4C	—	16-14	—	—	ᄀ+ᅣ+ᆻ
걍	U+AC4D	16-33	—	16-25	38-08	ᄀ+ᅣ+ᆼ
걔	U+AC54	16-34	—	17-31	17-19	ᄀ+ᅤ+∅
걘	U+AC58	16-35	—	17-32	17-20	ᄀ+ᅤ+ᆫ
걜	U+AC5C	16-36	—	17-33	17-21	ᄀ+ᅤ+ᆯ
걤	U+AC64	—	16-15	—	38-43	ᄀ+ᅤ+ᆷ
걥	U+AC65	—	16-16	—	38-44	ᄀ+ᅤ+ᆸ
거	U+AC70	16-37	—	16-26	16-23	ᄀ+ᅥ+∅
걱	U+AC71	16-38	—	16-27	16-24	ᄀ+ᅥ+ᆨ
걳	U+AC73	—	16-17	—	—	ᄀ+ᅥ+ᆪ
건	U+AC74	16-39	—	16-28	16-25	ᄀ+ᅥ+ᆫ
걵	U+AC75	—	16-18	—	—	ᄀ+ᅥ+ᆬ
걷	U+AC77	16-40	—	16-29	16-26	ᄀ+ᅥ+ᆮ
걸	U+AC78	16-41	—	16-30	16-27	ᄀ+ᅥ+ᆯ
걹	U+AC79	—	16-19	16-31	—	ᄀ+ᅥ+ᆰ
걺	U+AC7A	16-42	—	16-32	16-28	ᄀ+ᅥ+ᆱ
검	U+AC80	16-43	—	16-33	16-29	ᄀ+ᅥ+ᆷ
겁	U+AC81	16-44	—	16-34	16-30	ᄀ+ᅥ+ᆸ
것	U+AC83	16-45	—	16-35	16-31	ᄀ+ᅥ+ᆺ
겄	U+AC84	16-46	—	16-41	38-10	ᄀ+ᅥ+ᆻ
겅	U+AC85	16-47	—	16-36	16-32	ᄀ+ᅥ+ᆼ
겆	U+AC86	16-48	—	16-37	16-33	ᄀ+ᅥ+ᆽ
겇	U+AC87	—	16-20	—	38-09	ᄀ+ᅥ+ᆾ
겉	U+AC89	16-49	—	16-38	16-34	ᄀ+ᅥ+ᇀ
겊	U+AC8A	16-50	—	16-39	16-35	ᄀ+ᅥ+ᇁ
겋	U+AC8B	16-51	—	16-40	16-36	ᄀ+ᅥ+ᇂ
게	U+AC8C	16-52	—	17-34	17-22	ᄀ+ᅦ+∅
겍	U+AC8D	—	16-21	17-35	—	ᄀ+ᅦ+ᆨ
겐	U+AC90	16-53	—	17-36	17-23	ᄀ+ᅦ+ᆫ
겓	U+AC93	—	16-22	—	38-45	ᄀ+ᅦ+ᆮ
겔	U+AC94	16-54	—	17-37	17-24	ᄀ+ᅦ+ᆯ
겜	U+AC9C	16-55	—	17-38	38-46	ᄀ+ᅦ+ᆷ
겝	U+AC9D	16-56	—	17-39	17-25	ᄀ+ᅦ+ᆸ
겟	U+AC9F	16-57	—	17-40	17-26	ᄀ+ᅦ+ᆺ
겠	U+ACA0	16-58	—	17-42	17-28	ᄀ+ᅦ+ᆻ
겡	U+ACA1	16-59	—	17-41	17-27	ᄀ+ᅦ+ᆼ
겥	U+ACA5	—	16-23	—	38-47	ᄀ+ᅦ+ᇀ
겧	U+ACA7	—	16-24	—	—	ᄀ+ᅦ+ᇂ
겨	U+ACA8	16-60	—	16-42	16-37	ᄀ+ᅧ+∅
격	U+ACA9	16-61	—	16-43	16-38	ᄀ+ᅧ+ᆨ
겪	U+ACAA	16-62	—	16-52	16-47	ᄀ+ᅧ+ᆩ
견	U+ACAC	16-63	—	16-44	16-39	ᄀ+ᅧ+ᆫ
겯	U+ACAF	16-64	—	16-45	16-40	ᄀ+ᅧ+ᆮ
결	U+ACB0	16-65	—	16-46	16-41	ᄀ+ᅧ+ᆯ
겱	U+ACB1	—	16-25	—	38-11	ᄀ+ᅧ+ᆰ
겴	U+ACB4	—	16-26	—	38-12	ᄀ+ᅧ+ᆳ
겷	U+ACB7	—	16-27	—	—	ᄀ+ᅧ+ᆶ
겸	U+ACB8	16-66	—	16-47	16-42	ᄀ+ᅧ+ᆷ
겹	U+ACB9	16-67	—	16-48	16-43	ᄀ+ᅧ+ᆸ
겻	U+ACBB	16-68	—	16-49	16-44	ᄀ+ᅧ+ᆺ
겼	U+ACBC	16-69	—	16-53	16-48	ᄀ+ᅧ+ᆻ
경	U+ACBD	16-70	—	16-50	16-45	ᄀ+ᅧ+ᆼ
겾	U+ACBE	—	16-28	—	38-13	ᄀ+ᅧ+ᆽ
겿	U+ACBF	—	16-29	—	38-14	ᄀ+ᅧ+ᆾ
곁	U+ACC1	16-71	—	16-51	16-46	ᄀ+ᅧ+ᇀ
곂	U+ACC2	—	16-30	—	—	ᄀ+ᅧ+ᇁ
계	U+ACC4	16-72	—	17-43	17-29	ᄀ+ᅨ+∅
곅	U+ACC5	—	16-31	—	—	ᄀ+ᅨ+ᆨ
곈	U+ACC8	16-73	—	17-44	38-48	ᄀ+ᅨ+ᆫ
곋	U+ACCB	—	16-32	—	38-49	ᄀ+ᅨ+ᆮ
곌	U+ACCC	16-74	—	17-45	38-50	ᄀ+ᅨ+ᆯ
곔	U+ACD4	—	16-33	—	38-51	ᄀ+ᅨ+ᆷ
곕	U+ACD5	16-75	—	17-46	38-52	ᄀ+ᅨ+ᆸ
곗	U+ACD7	16-76	—	17-47	38-53	ᄀ+ᅨ+ᆺ
곘	U+ACD8	—	16-34	—	—	ᄀ+ᅨ+ᆻ
곙	U+ACD9	—	16-35	—	38-54	ᄀ+ᅨ+ᆼ
고	U+ACE0	16-77	—	16-54	16-49	ᄀ+ᅩ+∅
곡	U+ACE1	16-78	—	16-55	16-50	ᄀ+ᅩ+ᆨ
곤	U+ACE4	16-79	—	16-56	16-51	ᄀ+ᅩ+ᆫ
곧	U+ACE7	16-80	—	16-57	16-52	ᄀ+ᅩ+ᆮ
골	U+ACE8	16-81	—	16-58	16-53	ᄀ+ᅩ+ᆯ
곩	U+ACE9	—	16-36	—	38-15	ᄀ+ᅩ+ᆰ
곪	U+ACEA	16-82	—	16-59	16-54	ᄀ+ᅩ+ᆱ
곫	U+ACEB	—	16-37	—	—	ᄀ+ᅩ+ᆲ
곬	U+ACEC	16-83	—	16-60	16-55	ᄀ+ᅩ+ᆳ
곮	U+ACEE	—	16-38	—	—	ᄀ+ᅩ+ᆵ
곯	U+ACEF	16-84	—	16-61	16-56	ᄀ+ᅩ+ᆶ
곰	U+ACF0	16-85	—	16-62	16-57	ᄀ+ᅩ+ᆷ
곱	U+ACF1	16-86	—	16-63	16-58	ᄀ+ᅩ+ᆸ
곳	U+ACF3	16-87	—	16-64	16-59	ᄀ+ᅩ+ᆺ
공	U+ACF5	16-88	—	16-65	16-60	ᄀ+ᅩ+ᆼ
곶	U+ACF6	16-89	—	16-66	16-61	ᄀ+ᅩ+ᆽ
곷	U+ACF7	—	16-39	—	38-16	ᄀ+ᅩ+ᆾ
곹	U+ACF9	—	16-40	—	—	ᄀ+ᅩ+ᇀ
곺	U+ACFA	—	16-41	16-67	16-62	ᄀ+ᅩ+ᇁ
곻	U+ACFB	—	16-42	—	—	ᄀ+ᅩ+ᇂ
과	U+ACFC	16-90	—	17-65	17-45	ᄀ+ᅪ+∅
곽	U+ACFD	16-91	—	17-66	17-46	ᄀ+ᅪ+ᆨ
관	U+AD00	16-92	—	17-67	17-47	ᄀ+ᅪ+ᆫ
괃	U+AD03	—	16-43	17-68	38-64	ᄀ+ᅪ+ᆮ
괄	U+AD04	16-93	—	17-69	17-48	ᄀ+ᅪ+ᆯ
괆	U+AD06	16-94	—	17-70	17-49	ᄀ+ᅪ+ᆱ
괌	U+AD0C	17-01	—	17-71	17-50	ᄀ+ᅪ+ᆷ
괍	U+AD0D	17-02	—	17-72	17-51	ᄀ+ᅪ+ᆸ
괏	U+AD0F	17-03	—	17-73	38-65	ᄀ+ᅪ+ᆺ
괐	U+AD10	—	16-44	17-75	17-53	ᄀ+ᅪ+ᆻ
광	U+AD11	17-04	—	17-74	17-52	ᄀ+ᅪ+ᆼ
괘	U+AD18	17-05	—	17-83	17-58	ᄀ+ᅫ+∅
괙	U+AD19	—	16-45	17-84	38-69	ᄀ+ᅫ+ᆨ
괜	U+AD1C	17-06	—	17-85	17-59	ᄀ+ᅫ+ᆫ
괟	U+AD1F	—	16-46	—	38-70	ᄀ+ᅫ+ᆮ
괠	U+AD20	17-07	—	17-86	17-60	ᄀ+ᅫ+ᆯ
괢	U+AD22	—	16-47	—	—	ᄀ+ᅫ+ᆱ
괨	U+AD28	—	16-48	—	38-71	ᄀ+ᅫ+ᆷ
괩	U+AD29	17-08	—	17-87	38-72	ᄀ+ᅫ+ᆸ
괫	U+AD2B	—	16-49	—	38-73	ᄀ+ᅫ+ᆺ
괬	U+AD2C	17-09	—	17-89	38-74	ᄀ+ᅫ+ᆻ
괭	U+AD2D	17-10	—	17-88	17-61	ᄀ+ᅫ+ᆼ
괴	U+AD34	17-11	—	17-48	17-30	ᄀ+ᅬ+∅
괵	U+AD35	17-12	—	17-49	17-31	ᄀ+ᅬ+ᆨ
괸	U+AD38	17-13	—	17-50	17-32	ᄀ+ᅬ+ᆫ
괻	U+AD3B	—	16-50	—	38-55	ᄀ+ᅬ+ᆮ
괼	U+AD3C	17-14	—	17-51	17-33	ᄀ+ᅬ+ᆯ
괾	U+AD3E	—	16-51	—	—	ᄀ+ᅬ+ᆱ
굄	U+AD44	17-15	—	17-52	17-34	ᄀ+ᅬ+ᆷ
굅	U+AD45	17-16	—	17-53	17-35	ᄀ+ᅬ+ᆸ
굇	U+AD47	17-17	—	17-54	38-56	ᄀ+ᅬ+ᆺ
굈	U+AD48	—	16-52	17-56	17-37	ᄀ+ᅬ+ᆻ
굉	U+AD49	17-18	—	17-55	17-36	ᄀ+ᅬ+ᆼ
교	U+AD50	17-19	—	16-68	16-63	ᄀ+ᅭ+∅
굑	U+AD51	—	16-53	—	38-17	ᄀ+ᅭ+ᆨ
굔	U+AD54	17-20	—	16-69	16-64	ᄀ+ᅭ+ᆫ
굗	U+AD57	—	16-54	—	38-18	ᄀ+ᅭ+ᆮ
굘	U+AD58	17-21	—	16-70	16-65	ᄀ+ᅭ+ᆯ
굠	U+AD60	—	16-55	—	38-19	ᄀ+ᅭ+ᆷ
굡	U+AD61	17-22	—	16-71	16-66	ᄀ+ᅭ+ᆸ
굣	U+AD63	17-23	—	16-72	38-20	ᄀ+ᅭ+ᆺ
굥	U+AD65	—	16-56	—	38-21	ᄀ+ᅭ+ᆼ
구	U+AD6C	17-24	—	16-73	16-67	ᄀ+ᅮ+∅
국	U+AD6D	17-25	—	16-74	16-68	ᄀ+ᅮ+ᆨ
군	U+AD70	17-26	—	16-75	16-69	ᄀ+ᅮ+ᆫ
굳	U+AD73	17-27	—	16-76	16-70	ᄀ+ᅮ+ᆮ
굴	U+AD74	17-28	—	16-77	16-71	ᄀ+ᅮ+ᆯ
굵	U+AD75	17-29	—	16-78	16-72	ᄀ+ᅮ+ᆰ
굶	U+AD76	17-30	—	16-79	16-73	ᄀ+ᅮ+ᆱ
굸	U+AD78	—	16-57	—	38-22	ᄀ+ᅮ+ᆳ
굻	U+AD7B	17-31	—	16-80	16-74	ᄀ+ᅮ+ᆶ
굼	U+AD7C	17-32	—	16-81	16-75	ᄀ+ᅮ+ᆷ
굽	U+AD7D	17-33	—	16-82	16-76	ᄀ+ᅮ+ᆸ
굿	U+AD7F	17-34	—	16-83	16-77	ᄀ+ᅮ+ᆺ
궁	U+AD81	17-35	—	16-84	16-78	ᄀ+ᅮ+ᆼ
궂	U+AD82	17-36	—	16-85	16-79	ᄀ+ᅮ+ᆽ
궃	U+AD83	—	16-58	—	—	ᄀ+ᅮ+ᆾ
궆	U+AD86	—	16-59	—	—	ᄀ+ᅮ+ᇁ
궈	U+AD88	17-37	—	17-76	17-54	ᄀ+ᅯ+∅
궉	U+AD89	17-38	—	17-77	38-66	ᄀ+ᅯ+ᆨ
권	U+AD8C	17-39	—	17-78	17-55	ᄀ+ᅯ+ᆫ
궏	U+AD8F	—	16-60	—	38-67	ᄀ+ᅯ+ᆮ
궐	U+AD90	17-40	—	17-79	17-56	ᄀ+ᅯ+ᆯ
궘	U+AD98	—	—	17-80	—	ᄀ+ᅯ+ᆷ
궙	U+AD99	—	16-61	—	—	ᄀ+ᅯ+ᆸ
궛	U+AD9B	—	16-62	—	—	ᄀ+ᅯ+ᆺ
궜	U+AD9C	17-41	—	17-82	17-57	ᄀ+ᅯ+ᆻ
궝	U+AD9D	17-42	—	17-81	38-68	ᄀ+ᅯ+ᆼ
궤	U+ADA4	17-43	—	17-90	17-62	ᄀ+ᅰ+∅
궥	U+ADA5	—	16-63	17-91	38-75	ᄀ+ᅰ+ᆨ
궨	U+ADA8	—	16-64	—	38-76	ᄀ+ᅰ+ᆫ
궫	U+ADAB	—	16-65	—	38-77	ᄀ+ᅰ+ᆮ
궬	U+ADAC	—	16-66	—	38-78	ᄀ+ᅰ+ᆯ
궴	U+ADB4	—	16-67	—	38-79	ᄀ+ᅰ+ᆷ
궵	U+ADB5	—	16-68	—	38-80	ᄀ+ᅰ+ᆸ
궷	U+ADB7	17-44	—	17-92	38-81	ᄀ+ᅰ+ᆺ
궸	U+ADB8	—	16-69	—	38-83	ᄀ+ᅰ+ᆻ
궹	U+ADB9	—	16-70	—	38-82	ᄀ+ᅰ+ᆼ
귀	U+ADC0	17-45	—	17-57	17-38	ᄀ+ᅱ+∅
귁	U+ADC1	17-46	—	17-58	38-57	ᄀ+ᅱ+ᆨ
귄	U+ADC4	17-47	—	17-59	17-39	ᄀ+ᅱ+ᆫ
귇	U+ADC7	—	16-71	—	38-58	ᄀ+ᅱ+ᆮ
귈	U+ADC8	17-48	—	17-60	17-40	ᄀ+ᅱ+ᆯ
귊	U+ADCA	—	16-72	—	—	ᄀ+ᅱ+ᆱ
귐	U+ADD0	17-49	—	17-61	17-41	ᄀ+ᅱ+ᆷ
귑	U+ADD1	17-50	—	17-62	17-42	ᄀ+ᅱ+ᆸ
귓	U+ADD3	17-51	—	17-63	17-43	ᄀ+ᅱ+ᆺ
귔	U+ADD4	—	16-73	—	—	ᄀ+ᅱ+ᆻ
귕	U+ADD5	—	16-74	—	38-59	ᄀ+ᅱ+ᆼ
규	U+ADDC	17-52	—	16-86	16-80	ᄀ+ᅲ+∅
귝	U+ADDD	—	16-75	—	38-23	ᄀ+ᅲ+ᆨ
균	U+ADE0	17-53	—	16-87	16-81	ᄀ+ᅲ+ᆫ
귤	U+ADE4	17-54	—	16-88	16-82	ᄀ+ᅲ+ᆯ
귨	U+ADE8	—	16-76	—	38-24	ᄀ+ᅲ+ᆳ
귬	U+ADEC	—	16-77	16-89	38-25	ᄀ+ᅲ+ᆷ
귭	U+ADED	—	16-78	—	38-26	ᄀ+ᅲ+ᆸ
귯	U+ADEF	—	16-79	—	—	ᄀ+ᅲ+ᆺ
귱	U+ADF1	—	16-80	16-90	38-27	ᄀ+ᅲ+ᆼ
그	U+ADF8	17-55	—	16-91	16-83	ᄀ+ᅳ+∅
극	U+ADF9	17-56	—	16-92	16-84	ᄀ+ᅳ+ᆨ
근	U+ADFC	17-57	—	16-93	16-85	ᄀ+ᅳ+ᆫ
귾	U+ADFE	—	16-81	—	38-28	ᄀ+ᅳ+ᆭ
귿	U+ADFF	17-58	—	16-94	38-29	ᄀ+ᅳ+ᆮ
글	U+AE00	17-59	—	17-01	16-86	ᄀ+ᅳ+ᆯ
긁	U+AE01	17-60	—	17-02	16-87	ᄀ+ᅳ+ᆰ
긂	U+AE02	—	16-82	—	38-30	ᄀ+ᅳ+ᆱ
긃	U+AE03	—	16-83	—	38-31	ᄀ+ᅳ+ᆲ
긄	U+AE04	—	16-84	—	38-32	ᄀ+ᅳ+ᆳ
긇	U+AE07	—	16-85	17-03	16-88	ᄀ+ᅳ+ᆶ
금	U+AE08	17-61	—	17-04	16-89	ᄀ+ᅳ+ᆷ
급	U+AE09	17-62	—	17-05	16-90	ᄀ+ᅳ+ᆸ
긋	U+AE0B	17-63	—	17-06	16-91	ᄀ+ᅳ+ᆺ
긍	U+AE0D	17-64	—	17-07	16-92	ᄀ+ᅳ+ᆼ
긎	U+AE0E	—	16-86	—	—	ᄀ+ᅳ+ᆽ
긏	U+AE0F	—	16-87	—	38-33	ᄀ+ᅳ+ᆾ
긑	U+AE11	—	16-88	—	38-34	ᄀ+ᅳ+ᇀ
긒	U+AE12	—	16-89	—	—	ᄀ+ᅳ+ᇁ
긓	U+AE13	—	16-90	—	—	ᄀ+ᅳ+ᇂ
긔	U+AE14	17-65	—	17-64	17-44	ᄀ+ᅴ+∅
긕	U+AE15	—	16-91	—	—	ᄀ+ᅴ+ᆨ
긘	U+AE18	—	16-92	—	38-60	ᄀ+ᅴ+ᆫ
긜	U+AE1C	—	16-93	—	38-61	ᄀ+ᅴ+ᆯ
긠	U+AE20	—	16-94	—	—	ᄀ+ᅴ+ᆳ
긤	U+AE24	—	17-01	—	—	ᄀ+ᅴ+ᆷ
긥	U+AE25	—	17-02	—	—	ᄀ+ᅴ+ᆸ
긧	U+AE27	—	17-03	—	38-62	ᄀ+ᅴ+ᆺ
긩	U+AE29	—	17-04	—	38-63	ᄀ+ᅴ+ᆼ
기	U+AE30	17-66	—	17-08	16-93	ᄀ+ᅵ+∅
긱	U+AE31	17-67	—	17-09	38-35	ᄀ+ᅵ+ᆨ
긴	U+AE34	17-68	—	17-10	16-94	ᄀ+ᅵ+ᆫ
긷	U+AE37	17-69	—	17-11	17-01	ᄀ+ᅵ+ᆮ
길	U+AE38	17-70	—	17-12	17-02	ᄀ+ᅵ+ᆯ
긹	U+AE39	—	17-05	—	38-36	ᄀ+ᅵ+ᆰ
긺	U+AE3A	17-71	—	17-13	17-03	ᄀ+ᅵ+ᆱ
긼	U+AE3C	—	17-06	—	38-37	ᄀ+ᅵ+ᆳ
김	U+AE40	17-72	—	17-14	17-04	ᄀ+ᅵ+ᆷ
깁	U+AE41	17-73	—	17-15	17-05	ᄀ+ᅵ+ᆸ
깃	U+AE43	17-74	—	17-16	17-06	ᄀ+ᅵ+ᆺ
깄	U+AE44	—	17-07	—	—	ᄀ+ᅵ+ᆻ
깅	U+AE45	17-75	—	17-17	17-07	ᄀ+ᅵ+ᆼ
깆	U+AE46	17-76	—	17-18	38-38	ᄀ+ᅵ+ᆽ
깇	U+AE47	—	17-08	17-19	17-08	ᄀ+ᅵ+ᆾ
깉	U+AE49	—	17-09	17-20	17-09	ᄀ+ᅵ+ᇀ
깊	U+AE4A	17-77	—	17-21	17-10	ᄀ+ᅵ+ᇁ
깋	U+AE4B	—	17-10	—	38-39	ᄀ+ᅵ+ᇂ
까	U+AE4C	17-78	—	36-20	31-25	ᄁ+ᅡ+∅
깍	U+AE4D	17-79	—	36-21	31-26	ᄁ+ᅡ+ᆨ
깎	U+AE4E	17-80	—	36-31	31-36	ᄁ+ᅡ+ᆩ
깐	U+AE50	17-81	—	36-22	31-27	ᄁ+ᅡ+ᆫ
깓	U+AE53	—	17-11	36-23	48-29	ᄁ+ᅡ+ᆮ
깔	U+AE54	17-82	—	36-24	31-28	ᄁ+ᅡ+ᆯ
깖	U+AE56	17-83	—	36-25	31-29	ᄁ+ᅡ+ᆱ
깜	U+AE5C	17-84	—	36-26	31-30	ᄁ+ᅡ+ᆷ
깝	U+AE5D	17-85	—	36-27	31-31	ᄁ+ᅡ+ᆸ
깟	U+AE5F	17-86	—	36-28	31-32	ᄁ+ᅡ+ᆺ
깠	U+AE60	17-87	—	36-32	31-37	ᄁ+ᅡ+ᆻ
깡	U+AE61	17-88	—	36-29	31-33	ᄁ+ᅡ+ᆼ
깢	U+AE62	—	17-12	—	31-34	ᄁ+ᅡ+ᆽ
깣	U+AE63	—	17-13	—	—	ᄁ+ᅡ+ᆾ
깥	U+AE65	17-89	—	36-30	31-35	ᄁ+ᅡ+ᇀ
깨	U+AE68	17-90	—	37-04	31-93	ᄁ+ᅢ+∅
깩	U+AE69	17-91	—	37-05	31-94	ᄁ+ᅢ+ᆨ
깪	U+AE6A	—	17-14	—	—	ᄁ+ᅢ+ᆩ
깬	U+AE6C	17-92	—	37-06	32-01	ᄁ+ᅢ+ᆫ
깯	U+AE6F	—	17-15	—	48-65	ᄁ+ᅢ+ᆮ
깰	U+AE70	17-93	—	37-07	32-02	ᄁ+ᅢ+ᆯ
깳	U+AE73	—	17-16	—	—	ᄁ+ᅢ+ᆲ
깶	U+AE76	—	17-17	—	—	ᄁ+ᅢ+ᆵ
깸	U+AE78	17-94	—	37-08	32-03	ᄁ+ᅢ+ᆷ
깹	U+AE79	18-01	—	37-09	32-04	ᄁ+ᅢ+ᆸ
깻	U+AE7B	18-02	—	37-10	32-05	ᄁ+ᅢ+ᆺ
깼	U+AE7C	18-03	—	37-12	32-07	ᄁ+ᅢ+ᆻ
깽	U+AE7D	18-04	—	37-11	32-06	ᄁ+ᅢ+ᆼ
꺁	U+AE81	—	17-18	—	—	ᄁ+ᅢ+ᇀ
꺄	U+AE84	18-05	—	36-33	31-38	ᄁ+ᅣ+∅
꺅	U+AE85	18-06	—	36-34	48-30	ᄁ+ᅣ+ᆨ
꺈	U+AE88	—	17-19	36-35	—	ᄁ+ᅣ+ᆫ
꺋	U+AE8B	—	17-20	—	—	ᄁ+ᅣ+ᆮ
꺌	U+AE8C	18-07	—	36-36	48-31	ᄁ+ᅣ+ᆯ
꺍	U+AE8D	—	17-21	—	—	ᄁ+ᅣ+ᆰ
꺗	U+AE97	—	17-22	—	—	ᄁ+ᅣ+ᆺ
꺙	U+AE99	—	17-23	—	48-32	ᄁ+ᅣ+ᆼ
꺠	U+AEA0	—	17-24	37-13	48-66	ᄁ+ᅤ+∅
꺵	U+AEB5	—	17-25	—	—	ᄁ+ᅤ+ᆼ
꺼	U+AEBC	18-08	—	36-37	31-39	ᄁ+ᅥ+∅
꺽	U+AEBD	18-09	—	36-38	31-40	ᄁ+ᅥ+ᆨ
꺾	U+AEBE	18-10	—	36-45	31-47	ᄁ+ᅥ+ᆩ
껀	U+AEC0	18-11	—	36-39	31-41	ᄁ+ᅥ+ᆫ
껂	U+AEC2	—	17-26	—	48-33	ᄁ+ᅥ+ᆭ
껃	U+AEC3	—	17-27	—	48-34	ᄁ+ᅥ+ᆮ
껄	U+AEC4	18-12	—	36-40	31-42	ᄁ+ᅥ+ᆯ
껌	U+AECC	18-13	—	36-41	31-43	ᄁ+ᅥ+ᆷ
껍	U+AECD	18-14	—	36-42	31-44	ᄁ+ᅥ+ᆸ
껏	U+AECF	18-15	—	36-43	31-45	ᄁ+ᅥ+ᆺ
껐	U+AED0	18-16	—	36-46	31-48	ᄁ+ᅥ+ᆻ
껑	U+AED1	18-17	—	36-44	31-46	ᄁ+ᅥ+ᆼ
껒	U+AED2	—	17-28	—	—	ᄁ+ᅥ+ᆽ
껓	U+AED3	—	17-29	—	—	ᄁ+ᅥ+ᆾ
껕	U+AED5	—	17-30	—	48-35	ᄁ+ᅥ+ᇀ
께	U+AED8	18-18	—	37-14	32-08	ᄁ+ᅦ+∅
껙	U+AED9	18-19	—	37-15	48-67	ᄁ+ᅦ+ᆨ
껚	U+AEDA	—	17-31	—	—	ᄁ+ᅦ+ᆩ
껜	U+AEDC	18-20	—	37-16	32-09	ᄁ+ᅦ+ᆫ
껟	U+AEDF	—	17-32	—	48-68	ᄁ+ᅦ+ᆮ
껠	U+AEE0	—	17-33	37-17	32-10	ᄁ+ᅦ+ᆯ
껨	U+AEE8	18-21	—	37-18	32-11	ᄁ+ᅦ+ᆷ
껩	U+AEE9	—	17-34	37-19	48-69	ᄁ+ᅦ+ᆸ
껫	U+AEEB	18-22	—	37-20	48-70	ᄁ+ᅦ+ᆺ
껬	U+AEEC	—	17-35	37-22	48-72	ᄁ+ᅦ+ᆻ
껭	U+AEED	18-23	—	37-21	48-71	ᄁ+ᅦ+ᆼ
껱	U+AEF1	—	17-36	—	—	ᄁ+ᅦ+ᇀ
껴	U+AEF4	18-24	—	36-47	31-49	ᄁ+ᅧ+∅
껵	U+AEF5	—	17-37	—	48-36	ᄁ+ᅧ+ᆨ
껸	U+AEF8	18-25	—	36-48	48-37	ᄁ+ᅧ+ᆫ
껻	U+AEFB	—	17-38	—	48-38	ᄁ+ᅧ+ᆮ
껼	U+AEFC	18-26	—	36-49	48-39	ᄁ+ᅧ+ᆯ
꼄	U+AF04	—	17-39	—	48-40	ᄁ+ᅧ+ᆷ
꼅	U+AF05	—	17-40	—	48-41	ᄁ+ᅧ+ᆸ
꼇	U+AF07	18-27	—	36-50	48-42	ᄁ+ᅧ+ᆺ
꼈	U+AF08	18-28	—	36-52	31-50	ᄁ+ᅧ+ᆻ
꼉	U+AF09	—	17-41	—	48-43	ᄁ+ᅧ+ᆼ
꼍	U+AF0D	18-29	—	36-51	48-44	ᄁ+ᅧ+ᇀ
꼐	U+AF10	18-30	—	37-23	48-73	ᄁ+ᅨ+∅
꼗	U+AF17	—	17-42	—	—	ᄁ+ᅨ+ᆮ
꼥	U+AF25	—	17-43	—	48-74	ᄁ+ᅨ+ᆼ
꼬	U+AF2C	18-31	—	36-53	31-51	ᄁ+ᅩ+∅
꼭	U+AF2D	18-32	—	36-54	31-52	ᄁ+ᅩ+ᆨ
꼰	U+AF30	18-33	—	36-55	31-53	ᄁ+ᅩ+ᆫ
꼱	U+AF31	—	—	36-56	—	ᄁ+ᅩ+ᆬ
꼲	U+AF32	18-34	—	36-57	31-54	ᄁ+ᅩ+ᆭ
꼳	U+AF33	—	17-44	—	48-45	ᄁ+ᅩ+ᆮ
꼴	U+AF34	18-35	—	36-58	31-55	ᄁ+ᅩ+ᆯ
꼶	U+AF36	—	17-45	—	—	ᄁ+ᅩ+ᆱ
꼸	U+AF38	—	17-46	—	48-46	ᄁ+ᅩ+ᆳ
꼻	U+AF3B	—	17-47	—	—	ᄁ+ᅩ+ᆶ
꼼	U+AF3C	18-36	—	36-59	31-56	ᄁ+ᅩ+ᆷ
꼽	U+AF3D	18-37	—	36-60	31-57	ᄁ+ᅩ+ᆸ
꼿	U+AF3F	18-38	—	36-61	31-58	ᄁ+ᅩ+ᆺ
꽁	U+AF41	18-39	—	36-62	31-59	ᄁ+ᅩ+ᆼ
꽂	U+AF42	18-40	—	36-63	31-60	ᄁ+ᅩ+ᆽ
꽃	U+AF43	18-41	—	36-64	31-61	ᄁ+ᅩ+ᆾ
꽅	U+AF45	—	17-48	—	48-47	ᄁ+ᅩ+ᇀ
꽇	U+AF47	—	17-49	—	—	ᄁ+ᅩ+ᇂ
꽈	U+AF48	18-42	—	37-37	32-23	ᄁ+ᅪ+∅
꽉	U+AF49	18-43	—	37-38	32-24	ᄁ+ᅪ+ᆨ
꽌	U+AF4C	—	17-50	37-39	48-84	ᄁ+ᅪ+ᆫ
꽏	U+AF4F	—	17-51	—	48-85	ᄁ+ᅪ+ᆮ
꽐	U+AF50	18-44	—	37-40	32-25	ᄁ+ᅪ+ᆯ
꽘	U+AF58	—	17-52	—	48-86	ᄁ+ᅪ+ᆷ
꽙	U+AF59	—	17-53	—	48-87	ᄁ+ᅪ+ᆸ
꽛	U+AF5B	—	17-54	37-41	32-26	ᄁ+ᅪ+ᆺ
꽜	U+AF5C	18-45	—	37-43	32-28	ᄁ+ᅪ+ᆻ
꽝	U+AF5D	18-46	—	37-42	32-27	ᄁ+ᅪ+ᆼ
꽤	U+AF64	18-47	—	37-51	32-33	ᄁ+ᅫ+∅
꽥	U+AF65	18-48	—	37-52	32-34	ᄁ+ᅫ+ᆨ
꽨	U+AF68	—	17-55	37-53	48-92	ᄁ+ᅫ+ᆫ
꽫	U+AF6B	—	17-56	—	—	ᄁ+ᅫ+ᆮ
꽬	U+AF6C	—	17-57	37-54	48-93	ᄁ+ᅫ+ᆯ
꽴	U+AF74	—	17-58	—	—	ᄁ+ᅫ+ᆷ
꽵	U+AF75	—	17-59	—	—	ᄁ+ᅫ+ᆸ
꽸	U+AF78	—	17-60	—	—	ᄁ+ᅫ+ᆻ
꽹	U+AF79	18-49	—	37-55	32-35	ᄁ+ᅫ+ᆼ
꾀	U+AF80	18-50	—	37-24	32-12	ᄁ+ᅬ+∅
꾁	U+AF81	—	17-61	37-25	—	ᄁ+ᅬ+ᆨ
꾄	U+AF84	18-51	—	37-26	32-13	ᄁ+ᅬ+ᆫ
꾇	U+AF87	—	17-62	—	48-75	ᄁ+ᅬ+ᆮ
꾈	U+AF88	18-52	—	37-27	32-14	ᄁ+ᅬ+ᆯ
꾐	U+AF90	18-53	—	37-28	32-15	ᄁ+ᅬ+ᆷ
꾑	U+AF91	18-54	—	37-29	32-16	ᄁ+ᅬ+ᆸ
꾓	U+AF93	—	17-63	—	48-76	ᄁ+ᅬ+ᆺ
꾔	U+AF94	—	17-64	—	32-17	ᄁ+ᅬ+ᆻ
꾕	U+AF95	18-55	—	37-30	48-77	ᄁ+ᅬ+ᆼ
꾜	U+AF9C	18-56	—	36-65	31-62	ᄁ+ᅭ+∅
꾠	U+AFA0	—	17-65	—	48-48	ᄁ+ᅭ+ᆫ
꾣	U+AFA3	—	17-66	—	48-49	ᄁ+ᅭ+ᆮ
꾤	U+AFA4	—	17-67	—	48-50	ᄁ+ᅭ+ᆯ
꾬	U+AFAC	—	17-68	—	48-51	ᄁ+ᅭ+ᆷ
꾭	U+AFAD	—	17-69	—	48-52	ᄁ+ᅭ+ᆸ
꾲	U+AFB2	—	17-70	—	—	ᄁ+ᅭ+ᆽ
꾸	U+AFB8	18-57	—	36-66	31-63	ᄁ+ᅮ+∅
꾹	U+AFB9	18-58	—	36-67	31-64	ᄁ+ᅮ+ᆨ
꾼	U+AFBC	18-59	—	36-68	31-65	ᄁ+ᅮ+ᆫ
꾿	U+AFBF	—	17-71	36-69	48-53	ᄁ+ᅮ+ᆮ
꿀	U+AFC0	18-60	—	36-70	31-66	ᄁ+ᅮ+ᆯ
꿁	U+AFC1	—	17-72	—	48-54	ᄁ+ᅮ+ᆰ
꿇	U+AFC7	18-61	—	36-71	31-67	ᄁ+ᅮ+ᆶ
꿈	U+AFC8	18-62	—	36-72	31-68	ᄁ+ᅮ+ᆷ
꿉	U+AFC9	18-63	—	36-73	31-69	ᄁ+ᅮ+ᆸ
꿋	U+AFCB	18-64	—	36-74	31-70	ᄁ+ᅮ+ᆺ
꿍	U+AFCD	18-65	—	36-75	31-71	ᄁ+ᅮ+ᆼ
꿎	U+AFCE	18-66	—	36-76	31-72	ᄁ+ᅮ+ᆽ
꿏	U+AFCF	—	17-73	—	—	ᄁ+ᅮ+ᆾ
꿔	U+AFD4	18-67	—	37-44	32-29	ᄁ+ᅯ+∅
꿕	U+AFD5	—	17-74	—	48-88	ᄁ+ᅯ+ᆨ
꿘	U+AFD8	—	17-75	37-45	48-89	ᄁ+ᅯ+ᆫ
꿛	U+AFDB	—	17-76	—	48-90	ᄁ+ᅯ+ᆮ
꿜	U+AFDC	18-68	—	37-46	32-30	ᄁ+ᅯ+ᆯ
꿤	U+AFE4	—	17-77	—	—	ᄁ+ᅯ+ᆷ
꿥	U+AFE5	—	—	37-47	—	ᄁ+ᅯ+ᆸ
꿧	U+AFE7	—	17-78	37-48	48-91	ᄁ+ᅯ+ᆺ
꿨	U+AFE8	18-69	—	37-50	32-32	ᄁ+ᅯ+ᆻ
꿩	U+AFE9	18-70	—	37-49	32-31	ᄁ+ᅯ+ᆼ
꿰	U+AFF0	18-71	—	37-56	32-36	ᄁ+ᅰ+∅
꿱	U+AFF1	18-72	—	37-57	32-37	ᄁ+ᅰ+ᆨ
꿴	U+AFF4	18-73	—	37-58	32-38	ᄁ+ᅰ+ᆫ
꿷	U+AFF7	—	17-79	—	48-94	ᄁ+ᅰ+ᆮ
꿸	U+AFF8	18-74	—	37-59	32-39	ᄁ+ᅰ+ᆯ
뀀	U+B000	18-75	—	37-60	32-40	ᄁ+ᅰ+ᆷ
뀁	U+B001	18-76	—	37-61	32-41	ᄁ+ᅰ+ᆸ
뀃	U+B003	—	17-80	—	49-01	ᄁ+ᅰ+ᆺ
뀄	U+B004	18-77	—	37-63	32-42	ᄁ+ᅰ+ᆻ
뀅	U+B005	—	17-81	37-62	49-02	ᄁ+ᅰ+ᆼ
뀌	U+B00C	18-78	—	37-31	32-18	ᄁ+ᅱ+∅
뀍	U+B00D	—	17-82	—	—	ᄁ+ᅱ+ᆨ
뀐	U+B010	18-79	—	37-32	32-19	ᄁ+ᅱ+ᆫ
뀓	U+B013	—	17-83	—	—	ᄁ+ᅱ+ᆮ
뀔	U+B014	18-80	—	37-33	32-20	ᄁ+ᅱ+ᆯ
뀜	U+B01C	18-81	—	37-34	32-21	ᄁ+ᅱ+ᆷ
뀝	U+B01D	18-82	—	37-35	32-22	ᄁ+ᅱ+ᆸ
뀟	U+B01F	—	17-84	—	—	ᄁ+ᅱ+ᆺ
뀡	U+B021	—	17-85	37-36	48-78	ᄁ+ᅱ+ᆼ
뀨	U+B028	18-83	—	36-77	31-73	ᄁ+ᅲ+∅
뀬	U+B02C	—	17-86	—	48-55	ᄁ+ᅲ+ᆫ
뀰	U+B030	—	17-87	—	48-56	ᄁ+ᅲ+ᆯ
뀸	U+B038	—	17-88	—	48-57	ᄁ+ᅲ+ᆷ
뀹	U+B039	—	17-89	—	48-58	ᄁ+ᅲ+ᆸ
끄	U+B044	18-84	—	36-78	31-74	ᄁ+ᅳ+∅
끅	U+B045	18-85	—	36-79	31-75	ᄁ+ᅳ+ᆨ
끈	U+B048	18-86	—	36-80	31-76	ᄁ+ᅳ+ᆫ
끊	U+B04A	18-87	—	36-81	31-77	ᄁ+ᅳ+ᆭ
끋	U+B04B	—	17-90	—	48-59	ᄁ+ᅳ+ᆮ
끌	U+B04C	18-88	—	36-82	31-78	ᄁ+ᅳ+ᆯ
끍	U+B04D	—	17-91	—	48-60	ᄁ+ᅳ+ᆰ
끎	U+B04E	18-89	—	36-83	31-79	ᄁ+ᅳ+ᆱ
끓	U+B053	18-90	—	36-84	31-80	ᄁ+ᅳ+ᆶ
끔	U+B054	18-91	—	36-85	31-81	ᄁ+ᅳ+ᆷ
끕	U+B055	18-92	—	36-86	31-82	ᄁ+ᅳ+ᆸ
끗	U+B057	18-93	—	36-87	31-83	ᄁ+ᅳ+ᆺ
끙	U+B059	18-94	—	36-88	31-84	ᄁ+ᅳ+ᆼ
끛	U+B05B	—	17-92	—	48-61	ᄁ+ᅳ+ᆾ
끝	U+B05D	19-01	—	36-89	31-85	ᄁ+ᅳ+ᇀ
끟	U+B05F	—	17-93	—	—	ᄁ+ᅳ+ᇂ
끠	U+B060	—	17-94	—	48-79	ᄁ+ᅴ+∅
끡	U+B061	—	18-01	—	48-80	ᄁ+ᅴ+ᆨ
끧	U+B067	—	18-02	—	48-81	ᄁ+ᅴ+ᆮ
끨	U+B068	—	18-03	—	—	ᄁ+ᅴ+ᆯ
끫	U+B06B	—	18-04	—	—	ᄁ+ᅴ+ᆲ
끳	U+B073	—	18-05	—	48-82	ᄁ+ᅴ+ᆺ
끵	U+B075	—	18-06	—	48-83	ᄁ+ᅴ+ᆼ
끼	U+B07C	19-02	—	36-90	31-86	ᄁ+ᅵ+∅
끽	U+B07D	19-03	—	36-91	31-87	ᄁ+ᅵ+ᆨ
낀	U+B080	19-04	—	36-92	31-88	ᄁ+ᅵ+ᆫ
낃	U+B083	—	18-07	—	48-62	ᄁ+ᅵ+ᆮ
낄	U+B084	19-05	—	36-93	31-89	ᄁ+ᅵ+ᆯ
낋	U+B08B	—	18-08	—	—	ᄁ+ᅵ+ᆶ
낌	U+B08C	19-06	—	36-94	31-90	ᄁ+ᅵ+ᆷ
낍	U+B08D	19-07	—	37-01	31-91	ᄁ+ᅵ+ᆸ
낏	U+B08F	19-08	—	37-02	48-63	ᄁ+ᅵ+ᆺ
낐	U+B090	—	18-09	—	—	ᄁ+ᅵ+ᆻ
낑	U+B091	19-09	—	37-03	31-92	ᄁ+ᅵ+ᆼ
낕	U+B095	—	18-10	—	48-64	ᄁ+ᅵ+ᇀ
나	U+B098	19-10	—	17-93	17-66	ᄂ+ᅡ+∅
낙	U+B099	19-11	—	17-94	17-67	ᄂ+ᅡ+ᆨ
낚	U+B09A	19-12	—	18-15	17-82	ᄂ+ᅡ+ᆩ
낛	U+B09B	—	18-11	18-01	17-68	ᄂ+ᅡ+ᆪ
난	U+B09C	19-13	—	18-02	17-69	ᄂ+ᅡ+ᆫ
낟	U+B09F	19-14	—	18-03	17-70	ᄂ+ᅡ+ᆮ
날	U+B0A0	19-15	—	18-04	17-71	ᄂ+ᅡ+ᆯ
낡	U+B0A1	19-16	—	18-05	17-72	ᄂ+ᅡ+ᆰ
낢	U+B0A2	19-17	—	18-06	17-73	ᄂ+ᅡ+ᆱ
낤	U+B0A4	—	18-12	—	38-84	ᄂ+ᅡ+ᆳ
남	U+B0A8	19-18	—	18-07	17-74	ᄂ+ᅡ+ᆷ
납	U+B0A9	19-19	—	18-08	17-75	ᄂ+ᅡ+ᆸ
낪	U+B0AA	—	18-13	—	—	ᄂ+ᅡ+ᆹ
낫	U+B0AB	19-20	—	18-09	17-76	ᄂ+ᅡ+ᆺ
났	U+B0AC	19-21	—	18-16	17-83	ᄂ+ᅡ+ᆻ
낭	U+B0AD	19-22	—	18-10	17-77	ᄂ+ᅡ+ᆼ
낮	U+B0AE	19-23	—	18-11	17-78	ᄂ+ᅡ+ᆽ
낯	U+B0AF	19-24	—	18-12	17-79	ᄂ+ᅡ+ᆾ
낰	U+B0B0	—	18-14	—	—	ᄂ+ᅡ+ᆿ
낱	U+B0B1	19-25	—	18-13	17-80	ᄂ+ᅡ+ᇀ
낲	U+B0B2	—	18-15	—	—	ᄂ+ᅡ+ᇁ
낳	U+B0B3	19-26	—	18-14	17-81	ᄂ+ᅡ+ᇂ
내	U+B0B4	19-27	—	19-13	18-61	ᄂ+ᅢ+∅
낵	U+B0B5	19-28	—	19-14	39-30	ᄂ+ᅢ+ᆨ
낸	U+B0B8	19-29	—	19-15	18-62	ᄂ+ᅢ+ᆫ
낻	U+B0BB	—	18-16	—	39-31	ᄂ+ᅢ+ᆮ
낼	U+B0BC	19-30	—	19-16	18-63	ᄂ+ᅢ+ᆯ
냄	U+B0C4	19-31	—	19-17	18-64	ᄂ+ᅢ+ᆷ
냅	U+B0C5	19-32	—	19-18	18-65	ᄂ+ᅢ+ᆸ
냇	U+B0C7	19-33	—	19-19	18-66	ᄂ+ᅢ+ᆺ
냈	U+B0C8	19-34	—	19-21	18-68	ᄂ+ᅢ+ᆻ
냉	U+B0C9	19-35	—	19-20	18-67	ᄂ+ᅢ+ᆼ
냎	U+B0CE	—	18-17	—	—	ᄂ+ᅢ+ᇁ
냐	U+B0D0	19-36	—	18-17	17-84	ᄂ+ᅣ+∅
냑	U+B0D1	19-37	—	18-18	38-85	ᄂ+ᅣ+ᆨ
냔	U+B0D4	19-38	—	18-19	38-86	ᄂ+ᅣ+ᆫ
냗	U+B0D7	—	18-18	—	38-87	ᄂ+ᅣ+ᆮ
냘	U+B0D8	19-39	—	18-20	17-85	ᄂ+ᅣ+ᆯ
냠	U+B0E0	19-40	—	18-21	17-86	ᄂ+ᅣ+ᆷ
냡	U+B0E1	—	18-19	18-22	38-88	ᄂ+ᅣ+ᆸ
냣	U+B0E3	—	18-20	—	—	ᄂ+ᅣ+ᆺ
냥	U+B0E5	19-41	—	18-23	17-87	ᄂ+ᅣ+ᆼ
냦	U+B0E6	—	18-21	—	—	ᄂ+ᅣ+ᆽ
냩	U+B0E9	—	18-22	—	38-89	ᄂ+ᅣ+ᇀ
냬	U+B0EC	—	18-23	19-22	39-32	ᄂ+ᅤ+∅
넁	U+B101	—	18-24	—	39-33	ᄂ+ᅤ+ᆼ
너	U+B108	19-42	—	18-24	17-88	ᄂ+ᅥ+∅
넉	U+B109	19-43	—	18-25	17-89	ᄂ+ᅥ+ᆨ
넊	U+B10A	—	18-25	18-37	—	ᄂ+ᅥ+ᆩ
넋	U+B10B	19-44	—	18-26	17-90	ᄂ+ᅥ+ᆪ
넌	U+B10C	19-45	—	18-27	17-91	ᄂ+ᅥ+ᆫ
넏	U+B10F	—	18-26	—	38-90	ᄂ+ᅥ+ᆮ
널	U+B110	19-46	—	18-28	17-92	ᄂ+ᅥ+ᆯ
넒	U+B112	19-47	—	18-29	17-93	ᄂ+ᅥ+ᆱ
넓	U+B113	19-48	—	18-30	17-94	ᄂ+ᅥ+ᆲ
넗	U+B117	—	18-27	—	—	ᄂ+ᅥ+ᆶ
넘	U+B118	19-49	—	18-31	18-01	ᄂ+ᅥ+ᆷ
넙	U+B119	19-50	—	18-32	18-02	ᄂ+ᅥ+ᆸ
넛	U+B11B	19-51	—	18-33	18-03	ᄂ+ᅥ+ᆺ
넜	U+B11C	19-52	—	18-38	18-06	ᄂ+ᅥ+ᆻ
넝	U+B11D	19-53	—	18-34	18-04	ᄂ+ᅥ+ᆼ
넞	U+B11E	—	18-28	—	—	ᄂ+ᅥ+ᆽ
넠	U+B120	—	18-29	—	—	ᄂ+ᅥ+ᆿ
넡	U+B121	—	18-30	—	—	ᄂ+ᅥ+ᇀ
넢	U+B122	—	18-31	18-35	38-91	ᄂ+ᅥ+ᇁ
넣	U+B123	19-54	—	18-36	18-05	ᄂ+ᅥ+ᇂ
네	U+B124	19-55	—	19-23	18-69	ᄂ+ᅦ+∅
넥	U+B125	19-56	—	19-24	18-70	ᄂ+ᅦ+ᆨ
넨	U+B128	19-57	—	19-25	18-71	ᄂ+ᅦ+ᆫ
넫	U+B12B	—	18-32	—	39-34	ᄂ+ᅦ+ᆮ
넬	U+B12C	19-58	—	19-26	18-72	ᄂ+ᅦ+ᆯ
넴	U+B134	19-59	—	19-27	39-35	ᄂ+ᅦ+ᆷ
넵	U+B135	19-60	—	19-28	18-73	ᄂ+ᅦ+ᆸ
넷	U+B137	19-61	—	19-29	18-74	ᄂ+ᅦ+ᆺ
넸	U+B138	19-62	—	19-31	—	ᄂ+ᅦ+ᆻ
넹	U+B139	19-63	—	19-30	18-75	ᄂ+ᅦ+ᆼ
넼	U+B13C	—	18-33	—	—	ᄂ+ᅦ+ᆿ
넽	U+B13D	—	18-34	—	—	ᄂ+ᅦ+ᇀ
넾	U+B13E	—	18-35	—	—	ᄂ+ᅦ+ᇁ
넿	U+B13F	—	18-36	—	—	ᄂ+ᅦ+ᇂ
녀	U+B140	19-64	—	18-39	18-07	ᄂ+ᅧ+∅
녁	U+B141	19-65	—	18-40	18-08	ᄂ+ᅧ+ᆨ
녃	U+B143	—	18-37	—	—	ᄂ+ᅧ+ᆪ
년	U+B144	19-66	—	18-41	18-09	ᄂ+ᅧ+ᆫ
녇	U+B147	—	18-38	—	38-92	ᄂ+ᅧ+ᆮ
녈	U+B148	19-67	—	18-42	18-10	ᄂ+ᅧ+ᆯ
녋	U+B14B	—	18-39	—	38-93	ᄂ+ᅧ+ᆲ
념	U+B150	19-68	—	18-43	18-11	ᄂ+ᅧ+ᆷ
녑	U+B151	19-69	—	18-44	18-12	ᄂ+ᅧ+ᆸ
녓	U+B153	—	18-40	18-45	38-94	ᄂ+ᅧ+ᆺ
녔	U+B154	19-70	—	18-48	18-15	ᄂ+ᅧ+ᆻ
녕	U+B155	19-71	—	18-46	18-13	ᄂ+ᅧ+ᆼ
녘	U+B158	19-72	—	18-47	18-14	ᄂ+ᅧ+ᆿ
녙	U+B159	—	18-41	—	39-01	ᄂ+ᅧ+ᇀ
녚	U+B15A	—	18-42	—	39-02	ᄂ+ᅧ+ᇁ
녛	U+B15B	—	18-43	—	39-03	ᄂ+ᅧ+ᇂ
녜	U+B15C	19-73	—	19-32	18-76	ᄂ+ᅨ+∅
녝	U+B15D	—	18-44	—	—	ᄂ+ᅨ+ᆨ
녠	U+B160	19-74	—	19-33	39-36	ᄂ+ᅨ+ᆫ
녣	U+B163	—	18-45	—	39-37	ᄂ+ᅨ+ᆮ
녤	U+B164	—	18-46	—	39-38	ᄂ+ᅨ+ᆯ
녬	U+B16C	—	18-47	—	39-39	ᄂ+ᅨ+ᆷ
녭	U+B16D	—	18-48	—	39-40	ᄂ+ᅨ+ᆸ
녯	U+B16F	—	18-49	—	39-41	ᄂ+ᅨ+ᆺ
녱	U+B171	—	18-50	—	39-42	ᄂ+ᅨ+ᆼ
노	U+B178	19-75	—	18-49	18-16	ᄂ+ᅩ+∅
녹	U+B179	19-76	—	18-50	18-17	ᄂ+ᅩ+ᆨ
녺	U+B17A	—	18-51	—	—	ᄂ+ᅩ+ᆩ
녻	U+B17B	—	18-52	—	—	ᄂ+ᅩ+ᆪ
논	U+B17C	19-77	—	18-51	18-18	ᄂ+ᅩ+ᆫ
녾	U+B17E	—	18-53	—	39-04	ᄂ+ᅩ+ᆭ
녿	U+B17F	—	18-54	—	39-05	ᄂ+ᅩ+ᆮ
놀	U+B180	19-78	—	18-52	18-19	ᄂ+ᅩ+ᆯ
놂	U+B182	19-79	—	18-53	18-20	ᄂ+ᅩ+ᆱ
놈	U+B188	19-80	—	18-54	18-21	ᄂ+ᅩ+ᆷ
놉	U+B189	19-81	—	18-55	18-22	ᄂ+ᅩ+ᆸ
놋	U+B18B	19-82	—	18-56	18-23	ᄂ+ᅩ+ᆺ
농	U+B18D	19-83	—	18-57	18-24	ᄂ+ᅩ+ᆼ
놎	U+B18E	—	18-55	—	—	ᄂ+ᅩ+ᆽ
놐	U+B190	—	18-56	—	—	ᄂ+ᅩ+ᆿ
놑	U+B191	—	18-57	—	—	ᄂ+ᅩ+ᇀ
높	U+B192	19-84	—	18-58	18-25	ᄂ+ᅩ+ᇁ
놓	U+B193	19-85	—	18-59	18-26	ᄂ+ᅩ+ᇂ
놔	U+B194	19-86	—	19-51	18-87	ᄂ+ᅪ+∅
놕	U+B195	—	18-58	—	—	ᄂ+ᅪ+ᆨ
놘	U+B198	19-87	—	19-52	39-59	ᄂ+ᅪ+ᆫ
놛	U+B19B	—	18-59	—	39-60	ᄂ+ᅪ+ᆮ
놜	U+B19C	19-88	—	19-53	39-61	ᄂ+ᅪ+ᆯ
놤	U+B1A4	—	18-60	—	—	ᄂ+ᅪ+ᆷ
놥	U+B1A5	—	18-61	—	—	ᄂ+ᅪ+ᆸ
놧	U+B1A7	—	18-62	19-54	39-62	ᄂ+ᅪ+ᆺ
놨	U+B1A8	19-89	—	19-55	18-88	ᄂ+ᅪ+ᆻ
놩	U+B1A9	—	18-63	—	39-63	ᄂ+ᅪ+ᆼ
놰	U+B1B0	—	18-64	19-60	18-91	ᄂ+ᅫ+∅
놴	U+B1B4	—	18-65	—	—	ᄂ+ᅫ+ᆫ
놸	U+B1B8	—	18-66	—	—	ᄂ+ᅫ+ᆯ
뇄	U+B1C4	—	18-67	—	—	ᄂ+ᅫ+ᆻ
뇌	U+B1CC	19-90	—	19-34	18-77	ᄂ+ᅬ+∅
뇍	U+B1CD	—	18-68	—	39-43	ᄂ+ᅬ+ᆨ
뇐	U+B1D0	19-91	—	19-35	39-44	ᄂ+ᅬ+ᆫ
뇓	U+B1D3	—	18-69	—	39-45	ᄂ+ᅬ+ᆮ
뇔	U+B1D4	19-92	—	19-36	39-46	ᄂ+ᅬ+ᆯ
뇜	U+B1DC	19-93	—	19-37	39-47	ᄂ+ᅬ+ᆷ
뇝	U+B1DD	19-94	—	19-38	18-78	ᄂ+ᅬ+ᆸ
뇟	U+B1DF	20-01	—	19-39	39-48	ᄂ+ᅬ+ᆺ
뇠	U+B1E0	—	18-70	—	39-50	ᄂ+ᅬ+ᆻ
뇡	U+B1E1	—	18-71	—	39-49	ᄂ+ᅬ+ᆼ
뇦	U+B1E6	—	18-72	—	—	ᄂ+ᅬ+ᇁ
뇨	U+B1E8	20-02	—	18-60	18-27	ᄂ+ᅭ+∅
뇩	U+B1E9	20-03	—	18-61	39-06	ᄂ+ᅭ+ᆨ
뇬	U+B1EC	20-04	—	18-62	39-07	ᄂ+ᅭ+ᆫ
뇯	U+B1EF	—	18-73	—	—	ᄂ+ᅭ+ᆮ
뇰	U+B1F0	20-05	—	18-63	39-08	ᄂ+ᅭ+ᆯ
뇸	U+B1F8	—	18-74	18-64	39-09	ᄂ+ᅭ+ᆷ
뇹	U+B1F9	20-06	—	18-65	39-10	ᄂ+ᅭ+ᆸ
뇻	U+B1FB	20-07	—	18-66	—	ᄂ+ᅭ+ᆺ
뇽	U+B1FD	20-08	—	18-67	18-28	ᄂ+ᅭ+ᆼ
누	U+B204	20-09	—	18-68	18-29	ᄂ+ᅮ+∅
눅	U+B205	20-10	—	18-69	18-30	ᄂ+ᅮ+ᆨ
눈	U+B208	20-11	—	18-70	18-31	ᄂ+ᅮ+ᆫ
눋	U+B20B	20-12	—	18-71	18-32	ᄂ+ᅮ+ᆮ
눌	U+B20C	20-13	—	18-72	18-33	ᄂ+ᅮ+ᆯ
눍	U+B20D	—	18-75	—	—	ᄂ+ᅮ+ᆰ
눐	U+B210	—	18-76	—	—	ᄂ+ᅮ+ᆳ
눓	U+B213	—	18-77	—	—	ᄂ+ᅮ+ᆶ
눔	U+B214	20-14	—	18-73	18-34	ᄂ+ᅮ+ᆷ
눕	U+B215	20-15	—	18-74	18-35	ᄂ+ᅮ+ᆸ
눗	U+B217	20-16	—	18-75	39-11	ᄂ+ᅮ+ᆺ
눙	U+B219	20-17	—	18-76	18-36	ᄂ+ᅮ+ᆼ
눛	U+B21B	—	18-78	—	—	ᄂ+ᅮ+ᆾ
눞	U+B21E	—	18-79	18-77	18-37	ᄂ+ᅮ+ᇁ
눠	U+B220	20-18	—	19-56	18-89	ᄂ+ᅯ+∅
눡	U+B221	—	18-80	—	—	ᄂ+ᅯ+ᆨ
눤	U+B224	—	18-81	—	39-64	ᄂ+ᅯ+ᆫ
눧	U+B227	—	18-82	—	39-65	ᄂ+ᅯ+ᆮ
눨	U+B228	—	18-83	19-57	39-66	ᄂ+ᅯ+ᆯ
눰	U+B230	—	18-84	—	—	ᄂ+ᅯ+ᆷ
눱	U+B231	—	18-85	—	—	ᄂ+ᅯ+ᆸ
눳	U+B233	—	18-86	19-58	39-67	ᄂ+ᅯ+ᆺ
눴	U+B234	20-19	—	19-59	18-90	ᄂ+ᅯ+ᆻ
눵	U+B235	—	18-87	—	—	ᄂ+ᅯ+ᆼ
눼	U+B23C	20-20	—	19-61	18-92	ᄂ+ᅰ+∅
눽	U+B23D	—	18-88	—	—	ᄂ+ᅰ+ᆨ
뉀	U+B240	—	18-89	—	39-68	ᄂ+ᅰ+ᆫ
뉃	U+B243	—	18-90	—	39-69	ᄂ+ᅰ+ᆮ
뉄	U+B244	—	18-91	—	39-70	ᄂ+ᅰ+ᆯ
뉌	U+B24C	—	18-92	—	39-71	ᄂ+ᅰ+ᆷ
뉍	U+B24D	—	18-93	—	39-72	ᄂ+ᅰ+ᆸ
뉏	U+B24F	—	18-94	—	—	ᄂ+ᅰ+ᆺ
뉐	U+B250	—	19-01	—	39-73	ᄂ+ᅰ+ᆻ
뉑	U+B251	—	19-02	—	—	ᄂ+ᅰ+ᆼ
뉘	U+B258	20-21	—	19-40	18-79	ᄂ+ᅱ+∅
뉙	U+B259	—	19-03	—	—	ᄂ+ᅱ+ᆨ
뉜	U+B25C	20-22	—	19-41	18-80	ᄂ+ᅱ+ᆫ
뉟	U+B25F	—	19-04	—	39-51	ᄂ+ᅱ+ᆮ
뉠	U+B260	20-23	—	19-42	18-81	ᄂ+ᅱ+ᆯ
뉨	U+B268	20-24	—	19-43	18-82	ᄂ+ᅱ+ᆷ
뉩	U+B269	20-25	—	19-44	18-83	ᄂ+ᅱ+ᆸ
뉫	U+B26B	—	19-05	—	39-52	ᄂ+ᅱ+ᆺ
뉭	U+B26D	—	19-06	19-45	—	ᄂ+ᅱ+ᆼ
뉯	U+B26F	—	19-07	—	—	ᄂ+ᅱ+ᆾ
뉴	U+B274	20-26	—	18-78	18-38	ᄂ+ᅲ+∅
뉵	U+B275	20-27	—	18-79	18-39	ᄂ+ᅲ+ᆨ
뉸	U+B278	—	19-08	18-80	39-12	ᄂ+ᅲ+ᆫ
뉻	U+B27B	—	19-09	—	39-13	ᄂ+ᅲ+ᆮ
뉼	U+B27C	20-28	—	18-81	39-14	ᄂ+ᅲ+ᆯ
늄	U+B284	20-29	—	18-82	18-40	ᄂ+ᅲ+ᆷ
늅	U+B285	20-30	—	18-83	39-15	ᄂ+ᅲ+ᆸ
늇	U+B287	—	19-10	—	39-16	ᄂ+ᅲ+ᆺ
늉	U+B289	20-31	—	18-84	18-41	ᄂ+ᅲ+ᆼ
늊	U+B28A	—	19-11	—	39-17	ᄂ+ᅲ+ᆽ
늋	U+B28B	—	19-12	—	—	ᄂ+ᅲ+ᆾ
느	U+B290	20-32	—	18-85	18-42	ᄂ+ᅳ+∅
늑	U+B291	20-33	—	18-86	18-43	ᄂ+ᅳ+ᆨ
는	U+B294	20-34	—	18-87	18-44	ᄂ+ᅳ+ᆫ
늗	U+B297	—	19-13	—	39-18	ᄂ+ᅳ+ᆮ
늘	U+B298	20-35	—	18-88	18-45	ᄂ+ᅳ+ᆯ
늙	U+B299	20-36	—	18-89	18-46	ᄂ+ᅳ+ᆰ
늚	U+B29A	20-37	—	18-90	18-47	ᄂ+ᅳ+ᆱ
늜	U+B29C	—	19-14	—	39-19	ᄂ+ᅳ+ᆳ
늠	U+B2A0	20-38	—	18-91	18-48	ᄂ+ᅳ+ᆷ
늡	U+B2A1	20-39	—	18-92	18-49	ᄂ+ᅳ+ᆸ
늣	U+B2A3	20-40	—	18-93	39-20	ᄂ+ᅳ+ᆺ
능	U+B2A5	20-41	—	18-94	18-50	ᄂ+ᅳ+ᆼ
늦	U+B2A6	20-42	—	19-01	18-51	ᄂ+ᅳ+ᆽ
늧	U+B2A7	—	19-15	—	18-52	ᄂ+ᅳ+ᆾ
늪	U+B2AA	20-43	—	19-02	18-53	ᄂ+ᅳ+ᇁ
늫	U+B2AB	—	19-16	—	39-21	ᄂ+ᅳ+ᇂ
늬	U+B2AC	20-44	—	19-46	18-84	ᄂ+ᅴ+∅
늭	U+B2AD	—	19-17	—	39-53	ᄂ+ᅴ+ᆨ
늰	U+B2B0	20-45	—	19-47	39-54	ᄂ+ᅴ+ᆫ
늳	U+B2B3	—	19-18	—	39-55	ᄂ+ᅴ+ᆮ
늴	U+B2B4	20-46	—	19-48	18-85	ᄂ+ᅴ+ᆯ
늼	U+B2BC	—	19-19	19-49	39-56	ᄂ+ᅴ+ᆷ
늽	U+B2BD	—	19-20	—	39-57	ᄂ+ᅴ+ᆸ
늿	U+B2BF	—	19-21	—	39-58	ᄂ+ᅴ+ᆺ
닀	U+B2C0	—	19-22	—	—	ᄂ+ᅴ+ᆻ
닁	U+B2C1	—	19-23	19-50	18-86	ᄂ+ᅴ+ᆼ
니	U+B2C8	20-47	—	19-03	18-54	ᄂ+ᅵ+∅
닉	U+B2C9	20-48	—	19-04	18-55	ᄂ+ᅵ+ᆨ
닌	U+B2CC	20-49	—	19-05	18-56	ᄂ+ᅵ+ᆫ
닏	U+B2CF	—	19-24	—	39-22	ᄂ+ᅵ+ᆮ
닐	U+B2D0	20-50	—	19-06	18-57	ᄂ+ᅵ+ᆯ
닑	U+B2D1	—	19-25	—	39-23	ᄂ+ᅵ+ᆰ
닒	U+B2D2	20-51	—	19-07	—	ᄂ+ᅵ+ᆱ
닓	U+B2D3	—	19-26	—	39-24	ᄂ+ᅵ+ᆲ
닔	U+B2D4	—	19-27	—	39-25	ᄂ+ᅵ+ᆳ
님	U+B2D8	20-52	—	19-08	18-58	ᄂ+ᅵ+ᆷ
닙	U+B2D9	20-53	—	19-09	18-59	ᄂ+ᅵ+ᆸ
닛	U+B2DB	20-54	—	19-10	39-26	ᄂ+ᅵ+ᆺ
닝	U+B2DD	20-55	—	19-11	18-60	ᄂ+ᅵ+ᆼ
닞	U+B2DE	—	19-28	—	39-27	ᄂ+ᅵ+ᆽ
닠	U+B2E0	—	19-29	—	—	ᄂ+ᅵ+ᆿ
닢	U+B2E2	20-56	—	19-12	39-28	ᄂ+ᅵ+ᇁ
닣	U+B2E3	—	19-30	—	39-29	ᄂ+ᅵ+ᇂ
다	U+B2E4	20-57	—	19-62	18-94	ᄃ+ᅡ+∅
닥	U+B2E5	20-58	—	19-63	19-01	ᄃ+ᅡ+ᆨ
닦	U+B2E6	20-59	—	19-80	19-16	ᄃ+ᅡ+ᆩ
단	U+B2E8	20-60	—	19-64	19-02	ᄃ+ᅡ+ᆫ
닫	U+B2EB	20-61	—	19-65	19-03	ᄃ+ᅡ+ᆮ
달	U+B2EC	20-62	—	19-66	19-04	ᄃ+ᅡ+ᆯ
닭	U+B2ED	20-63	—	19-67	19-05	ᄃ+ᅡ+ᆰ
닮	U+B2EE	20-64	—	19-68	19-06	ᄃ+ᅡ+ᆱ
닯	U+B2EF	20-65	—	19-69	39-74	ᄃ+ᅡ+ᆲ
닰	U+B2F0	—	19-31	—	39-75	ᄃ+ᅡ+ᆳ
닲	U+B2F2	—	19-32	19-70	19-07	ᄃ+ᅡ+ᆵ
닳	U+B2F3	20-66	—	19-71	19-08	ᄃ+ᅡ+ᆶ
담	U+B2F4	20-67	—	19-72	19-09	ᄃ+ᅡ+ᆷ
답	U+B2F5	20-68	—	19-73	19-10	ᄃ+ᅡ+ᆸ
닶	U+B2F6	—	19-33	—	39-76	ᄃ+ᅡ+ᆹ
닷	U+B2F7	20-69	—	19-74	19-11	ᄃ+ᅡ+ᆺ
닸	U+B2F8	20-70	—	19-81	19-17	ᄃ+ᅡ+ᆻ
당	U+B2F9	20-71	—	19-75	19-12	ᄃ+ᅡ+ᆼ
닺	U+B2FA	20-72	—	19-76	19-13	ᄃ+ᅡ+ᆽ
닻	U+B2FB	20-73	—	19-77	19-14	ᄃ+ᅡ+ᆾ
닼	U+B2FC	—	19-34	—	—	ᄃ+ᅡ+ᆿ
닽	U+B2FD	—	19-35	—	—	ᄃ+ᅡ+ᇀ
닾	U+B2FE	—	—	19-78	—	ᄃ+ᅡ+ᇁ
닿	U+B2FF	20-74	—	19-79	19-15	ᄃ+ᅡ+ᇂ
대	U+B300	20-75	—	20-61	19-76	ᄃ+ᅢ+∅
댁	U+B301	20-76	—	20-62	19-77	ᄃ+ᅢ+ᆨ
댄	U+B304	20-77	—	20-63	19-78	ᄃ+ᅢ+ᆫ
댇	U+B307	—	19-36	—	40-21	ᄃ+ᅢ+ᆮ
댈	U+B308	20-78	—	20-64	19-79	ᄃ+ᅢ+ᆯ
댐	U+B310	20-79	—	20-65	19-80	ᄃ+ᅢ+ᆷ
댑	U+B311	20-80	—	20-66	19-81	ᄃ+ᅢ+ᆸ
댓	U+B313	20-81	—	20-67	19-82	ᄃ+ᅢ+ᆺ
댔	U+B314	20-82	—	20-69	19-84	ᄃ+ᅢ+ᆻ
댕	U+B315	20-83	—	20-68	19-83	ᄃ+ᅢ+ᆼ
댙	U+B319	—	19-37	—	—	ᄃ+ᅢ+ᇀ
댜	U+B31C	20-84	—	19-82	19-18	ᄃ+ᅣ+∅
댝	U+B31D	—	19-38	—	39-77	ᄃ+ᅣ+ᆨ
댠	U+B320	—	19-39	—	39-78	ᄃ+ᅣ+ᆫ
댤	U+B324	—	19-40	—	—	ᄃ+ᅣ+ᆯ
댧	U+B327	—	19-41	—	—	ᄃ+ᅣ+ᆲ
댬	U+B32C	—	19-42	—	—	ᄃ+ᅣ+ᆷ
댭	U+B32D	—	19-43	—	—	ᄃ+ᅣ+ᆸ
댯	U+B32F	—	19-44	—	—	ᄃ+ᅣ+ᆺ
댱	U+B331	—	19-45	—	39-79	ᄃ+ᅣ+ᆼ
댸	U+B338	—	19-46	20-70	—	ᄃ+ᅤ+∅
댼	U+B33C	—	19-47	—	—	ᄃ+ᅤ+ᆫ
덍	U+B34D	—	19-48	—	—	ᄃ+ᅤ+ᆼ
더	U+B354	20-85	—	19-83	19-19	ᄃ+ᅥ+∅
덕	U+B355	20-86	—	19-84	19-20	ᄃ+ᅥ+ᆨ
덖	U+B356	20-87	—	20-03	19-31	ᄃ+ᅥ+ᆩ
던	U+B358	20-88	—	19-85	19-21	ᄃ+ᅥ+ᆫ
덙	U+B359	—	19-49	—	—	ᄃ+ᅥ+ᆬ
덛	U+B35B	20-89	—	19-86	39-80	ᄃ+ᅥ+ᆮ
덜	U+B35C	20-90	—	19-87	19-22	ᄃ+ᅥ+ᆯ
덞	U+B35E	20-91	—	19-88	19-23	ᄃ+ᅥ+ᆱ
덟	U+B35F	20-92	—	19-89	19-24	ᄃ+ᅥ+ᆲ
덤	U+B364	20-93	—	19-90	19-25	ᄃ+ᅥ+ᆷ
덥	U+B365	20-94	—	19-91	19-26	ᄃ+ᅥ+ᆸ
덦	U+B366	—	19-50	—	39-81	ᄃ+ᅥ+ᆹ
덧	U+B367	21-01	—	19-92	19-27	ᄃ+ᅥ+ᆺ
덨	U+B368	—	19-51	20-04	19-32	ᄃ+ᅥ+ᆻ
덩	U+B369	21-02	—	19-93	19-28	ᄃ+ᅥ+ᆼ
덪	U+B36A	—	19-52	—	—	ᄃ+ᅥ+ᆽ
덫	U+B36B	21-03	—	19-94	19-29	ᄃ+ᅥ+ᆾ
덭	U+B36D	—	19-53	—	—	ᄃ+ᅥ+ᇀ
덮	U+B36E	21-04	—	20-01	19-30	ᄃ+ᅥ+ᇁ
덯	U+B36F	—	19-54	20-02	—	ᄃ+ᅥ+ᇂ
데	U+B370	21-05	—	20-71	19-85	ᄃ+ᅦ+∅
덱	U+B371	21-06	—	20-72	19-86	ᄃ+ᅦ+ᆨ
덴	U+B374	21-07	—	20-73	19-87	ᄃ+ᅦ+ᆫ
덷	U+B377	—	19-55	20-74	40-22	ᄃ+ᅦ+ᆮ
델	U+B378	21-08	—	20-75	19-88	ᄃ+ᅦ+ᆯ
뎀	U+B380	21-09	—	20-76	19-89	ᄃ+ᅦ+ᆷ
뎁	U+B381	21-10	—	20-77	19-90	ᄃ+ᅦ+ᆸ
뎃	U+B383	21-11	—	20-78	40-23	ᄃ+ᅦ+ᆺ
뎄	U+B384	21-12	—	20-80	19-92	ᄃ+ᅦ+ᆻ
뎅	U+B385	21-13	—	20-79	19-91	ᄃ+ᅦ+ᆼ
뎆	U+B386	—	19-56	—	—	ᄃ+ᅦ+ᆽ
뎊	U+B38A	—	19-57	—	—	ᄃ+ᅦ+ᇁ
뎌	U+B38C	21-14	—	20-05	19-33	ᄃ+ᅧ+∅
뎍	U+B38D	—	19-58	—	39-82	ᄃ+ᅧ+ᆨ
뎏	U+B38F	—	19-59	—	—	ᄃ+ᅧ+ᆪ
뎐	U+B390	21-15	—	20-06	39-83	ᄃ+ᅧ+ᆫ
뎓	U+B393	—	19-60	—	39-84	ᄃ+ᅧ+ᆮ
뎔	U+B394	21-16	—	20-07	39-85	ᄃ+ᅧ+ᆯ
뎘	U+B398	—	19-61	—	39-86	ᄃ+ᅧ+ᆳ
뎜	U+B39C	—	19-62	—	39-87	ᄃ+ᅧ+ᆷ
뎝	U+B39D	—	19-63	—	39-88	ᄃ+ᅧ+ᆸ
뎟	U+B39F	—	19-64	—	39-89	ᄃ+ᅧ+ᆺ
뎠	U+B3A0	21-17	—	20-09	19-34	ᄃ+ᅧ+ᆻ
뎡	U+B3A1	21-18	—	20-08	39-90	ᄃ+ᅧ+ᆼ
뎨	U+B3A8	21-19	—	20-81	19-93	ᄃ+ᅨ+∅
뎩	U+B3A9	—	19-65	—	—	ᄃ+ᅨ+ᆨ
뎬	U+B3AC	21-20	—	20-82	40-24	ᄃ+ᅨ+ᆫ
뎰	U+B3B0	—	19-66	—	—	ᄃ+ᅨ+ᆯ
뎸	U+B3B8	—	19-67	—	—	ᄃ+ᅨ+ᆷ
뎹	U+B3B9	—	19-68	—	—	ᄃ+ᅨ+ᆸ
뎻	U+B3BB	—	19-69	—	40-25	ᄃ+ᅨ+ᆺ
뎽	U+B3BD	—	19-70	—	40-26	ᄃ+ᅨ+ᆼ
도	U+B3C4	21-21	—	20-10	19-35	ᄃ+ᅩ+∅
독	U+B3C5	21-22	—	20-11	19-36	ᄃ+ᅩ+ᆨ
돆	U+B3C6	—	19-71	—	—	ᄃ+ᅩ+ᆩ
돇	U+B3C7	—	19-72	—	39-91	ᄃ+ᅩ+ᆪ
돈	U+B3C8	21-23	—	20-12	19-37	ᄃ+ᅩ+ᆫ
돋	U+B3CB	21-24	—	20-13	19-38	ᄃ+ᅩ+ᆮ
돌	U+B3CC	21-25	—	20-14	19-39	ᄃ+ᅩ+ᆯ
돎	U+B3CE	21-26	—	20-15	19-40	ᄃ+ᅩ+ᆱ
돏	U+B3CF	—	19-73	—	39-92	ᄃ+ᅩ+ᆲ
돐	U+B3D0	21-27	—	20-16	19-41	ᄃ+ᅩ+ᆳ
돓	U+B3D3	—	19-74	—	—	ᄃ+ᅩ+ᆶ
돔	U+B3D4	21-28	—	20-17	19-42	ᄃ+ᅩ+ᆷ
돕	U+B3D5	21-29	—	20-18	19-43	ᄃ+ᅩ+ᆸ
돗	U+B3D7	21-30	—	20-19	19-44	ᄃ+ᅩ+ᆺ
동	U+B3D9	21-31	—	20-20	19-45	ᄃ+ᅩ+ᆼ
돚	U+B3DA	—	19-75	—	—	ᄃ+ᅩ+ᆽ
돛	U+B3DB	21-32	—	20-21	19-46	ᄃ+ᅩ+ᆾ
돜	U+B3DC	—	19-76	—	—	ᄃ+ᅩ+ᆿ
돝	U+B3DD	21-33	—	20-22	39-93	ᄃ+ᅩ+ᇀ
돞	U+B3DE	—	19-77	—	—	ᄃ+ᅩ+ᇁ
돟	U+B3DF	—	19-78	—	—	ᄃ+ᅩ+ᇂ
돠	U+B3E0	21-34	—	21-10	20-11	ᄃ+ᅪ+∅
돡	U+B3E1	—	19-79	—	40-40	ᄃ+ᅪ+ᆨ
돤	U+B3E4	21-35	—	21-11	40-41	ᄃ+ᅪ+ᆫ
돨	U+B3E8	21-36	—	21-12	20-12	ᄃ+ᅪ+ᆯ
돰	U+B3F0	—	19-80	—	—	ᄃ+ᅪ+ᆷ
돱	U+B3F1	—	19-81	—	—	ᄃ+ᅪ+ᆸ
돳	U+B3F3	—	19-82	—	—	ᄃ+ᅪ+ᆺ
돴	U+B3F4	—	19-83	—	—	ᄃ+ᅪ+ᆻ
돵	U+B3F5	—	19-84	—	40-42	ᄃ+ᅪ+ᆼ
돼	U+B3FC	21-37	—	21-19	20-18	ᄃ+ᅫ+∅
됀	U+B400	—	19-85	21-20	40-45	ᄃ+ᅫ+ᆫ
됃	U+B403	—	19-86	—	40-46	ᄃ+ᅫ+ᆮ
됄	U+B404	—	19-87	21-21	40-47	ᄃ+ᅫ+ᆯ
됌	U+B40C	—	19-88	—	40-48	ᄃ+ᅫ+ᆷ
됍	U+B40D	—	19-89	—	40-49	ᄃ+ᅫ+ᆸ
됏	U+B40F	—	19-90	—	40-50	ᄃ+ᅫ+ᆺ
됐	U+B410	21-38	—	21-22	20-19	ᄃ+ᅫ+ᆻ
되	U+B418	21-39	—	20-83	19-94	ᄃ+ᅬ+∅
됙	U+B419	—	19-91	—	—	ᄃ+ᅬ+ᆨ
된	U+B41C	21-40	—	20-84	20-01	ᄃ+ᅬ+ᆫ
됟	U+B41F	—	19-92	—	40-27	ᄃ+ᅬ+ᆮ
될	U+B420	21-41	—	20-85	20-02	ᄃ+ᅬ+ᆯ
됤	U+B424	—	19-93	—	—	ᄃ+ᅬ+ᆳ
됨	U+B428	21-42	—	20-86	20-03	ᄃ+ᅬ+ᆷ
됩	U+B429	21-43	—	20-87	20-04	ᄃ+ᅬ+ᆸ
됫	U+B42B	21-44	—	20-88	40-28	ᄃ+ᅬ+ᆺ
됬	U+B42C	—	19-94	20-90	40-30	ᄃ+ᅬ+ᆻ
됭	U+B42D	—	20-01	20-89	40-29	ᄃ+ᅬ+ᆼ
됴	U+B434	21-45	—	20-23	19-47	ᄃ+ᅭ+∅
됵	U+B435	—	20-02	—	39-94	ᄃ+ᅭ+ᆨ
됸	U+B438	—	20-03	—	40-01	ᄃ+ᅭ+ᆫ
됻	U+B43B	—	20-04	—	40-02	ᄃ+ᅭ+ᆮ
됼	U+B43C	—	20-05	—	—	ᄃ+ᅭ+ᆯ
둄	U+B444	—	20-06	—	—	ᄃ+ᅭ+ᆷ
둅	U+B445	—	20-07	—	—	ᄃ+ᅭ+ᆸ
둇	U+B447	—	20-08	—	40-03	ᄃ+ᅭ+ᆺ
둉	U+B449	—	20-09	—	—	ᄃ+ᅭ+ᆼ
둏	U+B44F	—	20-10	—	40-04	ᄃ+ᅭ+ᇂ
두	U+B450	21-46	—	20-24	19-48	ᄃ+ᅮ+∅
둑	U+B451	21-47	—	20-25	19-49	ᄃ+ᅮ+ᆨ
둔	U+B454	21-48	—	20-26	19-50	ᄃ+ᅮ+ᆫ
둗	U+B457	—	20-11	—	40-05	ᄃ+ᅮ+ᆮ
둘	U+B458	21-49	—	20-27	19-51	ᄃ+ᅮ+ᆯ
둙	U+B459	—	20-12	—	40-06	ᄃ+ᅮ+ᆰ
둚	U+B45A	—	20-13	—	—	ᄃ+ᅮ+ᆱ
둛	U+B45B	—	20-14	—	40-07	ᄃ+ᅮ+ᆲ
둠	U+B460	21-50	—	20-28	19-52	ᄃ+ᅮ+ᆷ
둡	U+B461	21-51	—	20-29	19-53	ᄃ+ᅮ+ᆸ
둣	U+B463	21-52	—	20-30	40-08	ᄃ+ᅮ+ᆺ
둥	U+B465	21-53	—	20-31	19-54	ᄃ+ᅮ+ᆼ
둪	U+B46A	—	20-15	—	40-09	ᄃ+ᅮ+ᇁ
둬	U+B46C	21-54	—	21-13	20-13	ᄃ+ᅯ+∅
둭	U+B46D	—	20-16	—	—	ᄃ+ᅯ+ᆨ
둰	U+B470	—	20-17	21-14	40-43	ᄃ+ᅯ+ᆫ
둳	U+B473	—	20-18	—	40-44	ᄃ+ᅯ+ᆮ
둴	U+B474	—	20-19	21-15	20-14	ᄃ+ᅯ+ᆯ
둼	U+B47C	—	20-20	21-16	20-15	ᄃ+ᅯ+ᆷ
둽	U+B47D	—	20-21	—	—	ᄃ+ᅯ+ᆸ
둿	U+B47F	—	20-22	21-17	20-16	ᄃ+ᅯ+ᆺ
뒀	U+B480	21-55	—	21-18	20-17	ᄃ+ᅯ+ᆻ
뒁	U+B481	—	20-23	—	—	ᄃ+ᅯ+ᆼ
뒈	U+B488	21-56	—	21-23	20-20	ᄃ+ᅰ+∅
뒉	U+B489	—	20-24	—	—	ᄃ+ᅰ+ᆨ
뒌	U+B48C	—	20-25	—	40-51	ᄃ+ᅰ+ᆫ
뒏	U+B48F	—	20-26	—	40-52	ᄃ+ᅰ+ᆮ
뒐	U+B490	—	20-27	—	40-53	ᄃ+ᅰ+ᆯ
뒘	U+B498	—	20-28	—	40-54	ᄃ+ᅰ+ᆷ
뒙	U+B499	—	20-29	—	40-55	ᄃ+ᅰ+ᆸ
뒛	U+B49B	—	20-30	—	40-56	ᄃ+ᅰ+ᆺ
뒜	U+B49C	—	20-31	—	20-22	ᄃ+ᅰ+ᆻ
뒝	U+B49D	21-57	—	21-24	20-21	ᄃ+ᅰ+ᆼ
뒤	U+B4A4	21-58	—	20-91	20-05	ᄃ+ᅱ+∅
뒥	U+B4A5	—	20-32	20-92	—	ᄃ+ᅱ+ᆨ
뒨	U+B4A8	21-59	—	20-93	20-06	ᄃ+ᅱ+ᆫ
뒫	U+B4AB	—	20-33	—	40-31	ᄃ+ᅱ+ᆮ
뒬	U+B4AC	21-60	—	20-94	40-32	ᄃ+ᅱ+ᆯ
뒴	U+B4B4	—	20-34	21-01	20-07	ᄃ+ᅱ+ᆷ
뒵	U+B4B5	21-61	—	21-02	20-08	ᄃ+ᅱ+ᆸ
뒷	U+B4B7	21-62	—	21-03	20-09	ᄃ+ᅱ+ᆺ
뒸	U+B4B8	—	20-35	—	—	ᄃ+ᅱ+ᆻ
뒹	U+B4B9	21-63	—	21-04	20-10	ᄃ+ᅱ+ᆼ
듀	U+B4C0	21-64	—	20-32	19-55	ᄃ+ᅲ+∅
듁	U+B4C1	—	20-36	—	40-10	ᄃ+ᅲ+ᆨ
듄	U+B4C4	21-65	—	20-33	40-11	ᄃ+ᅲ+ᆫ
듈	U+B4C8	21-66	—	20-34	19-56	ᄃ+ᅲ+ᆯ
듐	U+B4D0	21-67	—	20-35	19-57	ᄃ+ᅲ+ᆷ
듑	U+B4D1	—	20-37	—	—	ᄃ+ᅲ+ᆸ
듓	U+B4D3	—	20-38	—	40-12	ᄃ+ᅲ+ᆺ
듕	U+B4D5	21-68	—	20-36	40-13	ᄃ+ᅲ+ᆼ
드	U+B4DC	21-69	—	20-37	19-58	ᄃ+ᅳ+∅
득	U+B4DD	21-70	—	20-38	19-59	ᄃ+ᅳ+ᆨ
든	U+B4E0	21-71	—	20-39	19-60	ᄃ+ᅳ+ᆫ
듣	U+B4E3	21-72	—	20-40	19-61	ᄃ+ᅳ+ᆮ
들	U+B4E4	21-73	—	20-41	19-62	ᄃ+ᅳ+ᆯ
듥	U+B4E5	—	20-39	20-42	40-14	ᄃ+ᅳ+ᆰ
듦	U+B4E6	21-74	—	20-43	19-63	ᄃ+ᅳ+ᆱ
듧	U+B4E7	—	20-40	20-44	40-15	ᄃ+ᅳ+ᆲ
듨	U+B4E8	—	20-41	—	40-16	ᄃ+ᅳ+ᆳ
듬	U+B4EC	21-75	—	20-45	19-64	ᄃ+ᅳ+ᆷ
듭	U+B4ED	21-76	—	20-46	19-65	ᄃ+ᅳ+ᆸ
듯	U+B4EF	21-77	—	20-47	19-66	ᄃ+ᅳ+ᆺ
등	U+B4F1	21-78	—	20-48	19-67	ᄃ+ᅳ+ᆼ
듸	U+B4F8	21-79	—	21-05	40-33	ᄃ+ᅴ+∅
듹	U+B4F9	—	20-42	—	—	ᄃ+ᅴ+ᆨ
듼	U+B4FC	—	20-43	21-06	40-34	ᄃ+ᅴ+ᆫ
듿	U+B4FF	—	20-44	—	40-35	ᄃ+ᅴ+ᆮ
딀	U+B500	—	20-45	21-07	40-36	ᄃ+ᅴ+ᆯ
딈	U+B508	—	20-46	—	—	ᄃ+ᅴ+ᆷ
딉	U+B509	—	20-47	21-08	40-37	ᄃ+ᅴ+ᆸ
딋	U+B50B	—	20-48	—	40-38	ᄃ+ᅴ+ᆺ
딍	U+B50D	—	20-49	21-09	40-39	ᄃ+ᅴ+ᆼ
디	U+B514	21-80	—	20-49	19-68	ᄃ+ᅵ+∅
딕	U+B515	21-81	—	20-50	40-17	ᄃ+ᅵ+ᆨ
딘	U+B518	21-82	—	20-51	19-69	ᄃ+ᅵ+ᆫ
딛	U+B51B	21-83	—	20-52	19-70	ᄃ+ᅵ+ᆮ
딜	U+B51C	21-84	—	20-53	19-71	ᄃ+ᅵ+ᆯ
딤	U+B524	21-85	—	20-54	19-72	ᄃ+ᅵ+ᆷ
딥	U+B525	21-86	—	20-55	19-73	ᄃ+ᅵ+ᆸ
딧	U+B527	21-87	—	20-56	40-18	ᄃ+ᅵ+ᆺ
딨	U+B528	21-88	—	20-60	—	ᄃ+ᅵ+ᆻ
딩	U+B529	21-89	—	20-57	19-74	ᄃ+ᅵ+ᆼ
딪	U+B52A	21-90	—	20-58	19-75	ᄃ+ᅵ+ᆽ
딫	U+B52B	—	20-50	—	—	ᄃ+ᅵ+ᆾ
딭	U+B52D	—	20-51	—	—	ᄃ+ᅵ+ᇀ
딮	U+B52E	—	20-52	20-59	40-19	ᄃ+ᅵ+ᇁ
딯	U+B52F	—	20-53	—	40-20	ᄃ+ᅵ+ᇂ
따	U+B530	21-91	—	37-64	32-44	ᄄ+ᅡ+∅
딱	U+B531	21-92	—	37-65	32-45	ᄄ+ᅡ+ᆨ
딲	U+B532	—	20-54	37-74	49-06	ᄄ+ᅡ+ᆩ
딴	U+B534	21-93	—	37-66	32-46	ᄄ+ᅡ+ᆫ
딷	U+B537	—	20-55	—	49-03	ᄄ+ᅡ+ᆮ
딸	U+B538	21-94	—	37-67	32-47	ᄄ+ᅡ+ᆯ
딹	U+B539	—	20-56	—	—	ᄄ+ᅡ+ᆰ
딺	U+B53A	—	20-57	—	—	ᄄ+ᅡ+ᆱ
딻	U+B53B	—	20-58	—	49-04	ᄄ+ᅡ+ᆲ
딿	U+B53F	—	20-59	37-68	49-05	ᄄ+ᅡ+ᆶ
땀	U+B540	22-01	—	37-69	32-48	ᄄ+ᅡ+ᆷ
땁	U+B541	22-02	—	37-70	32-49	ᄄ+ᅡ+ᆸ
땃	U+B543	22-03	—	37-71	32-50	ᄄ+ᅡ+ᆺ
땄	U+B544	22-04	—	37-75	32-53	ᄄ+ᅡ+ᆻ
땅	U+B545	22-05	—	37-72	32-51	ᄄ+ᅡ+ᆼ
땋	U+B54B	22-06	—	37-73	32-52	ᄄ+ᅡ+ᇂ
때	U+B54C	22-07	—	38-33	32-94	ᄄ+ᅢ+∅
땍	U+B54D	22-08	—	38-34	33-01	ᄄ+ᅢ+ᆨ
땎	U+B54E	—	20-60	—	—	ᄄ+ᅢ+ᆩ
땐	U+B550	22-09	—	38-35	33-02	ᄄ+ᅢ+ᆫ
땓	U+B553	—	20-61	—	49-34	ᄄ+ᅢ+ᆮ
땔	U+B554	22-10	—	38-36	33-03	ᄄ+ᅢ+ᆯ
땜	U+B55C	22-11	—	38-37	33-04	ᄄ+ᅢ+ᆷ
땝	U+B55D	22-12	—	38-38	33-05	ᄄ+ᅢ+ᆸ
땟	U+B55F	22-13	—	38-39	49-35	ᄄ+ᅢ+ᆺ
땠	U+B560	22-14	—	38-41	33-07	ᄄ+ᅢ+ᆻ
땡	U+B561	22-15	—	38-40	33-06	ᄄ+ᅢ+ᆼ
땧	U+B567	—	20-62	—	—	ᄄ+ᅢ+ᇂ
땨	U+B568	—	20-63	37-76	—	ᄄ+ᅣ+∅
땩	U+B569	—	20-64	—	49-07	ᄄ+ᅣ+ᆨ
땬	U+B56C	—	20-65	—	49-08	ᄄ+ᅣ+ᆫ
땰	U+B570	—	—	37-77	—	ᄄ+ᅣ+ᆯ
땽	U+B57D	—	20-66	—	49-09	ᄄ+ᅣ+ᆼ
떄	U+B584	—	20-67	—	—	ᄄ+ᅤ+∅
떈	U+B588	—	20-68	—	—	ᄄ+ᅤ+ᆫ
떠	U+B5A0	22-16	—	37-78	32-54	ᄄ+ᅥ+∅
떡	U+B5A1	22-17	—	37-79	32-55	ᄄ+ᅥ+ᆨ
떤	U+B5A4	22-18	—	37-80	32-56	ᄄ+ᅥ+ᆫ
떧	U+B5A7	—	20-69	—	49-10	ᄄ+ᅥ+ᆮ
떨	U+B5A8	22-19	—	37-81	32-57	ᄄ+ᅥ+ᆯ
떪	U+B5AA	22-20	—	37-82	32-58	ᄄ+ᅥ+ᆱ
떫	U+B5AB	22-21	—	37-83	32-59	ᄄ+ᅥ+ᆲ
떯	U+B5AF	—	20-70	—	—	ᄄ+ᅥ+ᆶ
떰	U+B5B0	22-22	—	37-84	32-60	ᄄ+ᅥ+ᆷ
떱	U+B5B1	22-23	—	37-85	32-61	ᄄ+ᅥ+ᆸ
떳	U+B5B3	22-24	—	37-86	32-62	ᄄ+ᅥ+ᆺ
떴	U+B5B4	22-25	—	37-89	32-65	ᄄ+ᅥ+ᆻ
떵	U+B5B5	22-26	—	37-87	32-63	ᄄ+ᅥ+ᆼ
떻	U+B5BB	22-27	—	37-88	32-64	ᄄ+ᅥ+ᇂ
떼	U+B5BC	22-28	—	38-42	33-08	ᄄ+ᅦ+∅
떽	U+B5BD	22-29	—	38-43	33-09	ᄄ+ᅦ+ᆨ
뗀	U+B5C0	22-30	—	38-44	33-10	ᄄ+ᅦ+ᆫ
뗃	U+B5C3	—	20-71	—	49-36	ᄄ+ᅦ+ᆮ
뗄	U+B5C4	22-31	—	38-45	33-11	ᄄ+ᅦ+ᆯ
뗌	U+B5CC	22-32	—	38-46	33-12	ᄄ+ᅦ+ᆷ
뗍	U+B5CD	22-33	—	38-47	33-13	ᄄ+ᅦ+ᆸ
뗏	U+B5CF	22-34	—	38-48	33-14	ᄄ+ᅦ+ᆺ
뗐	U+B5D0	22-35	—	38-50	33-16	ᄄ+ᅦ+ᆻ
뗑	U+B5D1	22-36	—	38-49	33-15	ᄄ+ᅦ+ᆼ
뗘	U+B5D8	22-37	—	37-90	—	ᄄ+ᅧ+∅
뗙	U+B5D9	—	20-72	—	49-11	ᄄ+ᅧ+ᆨ
뗜	U+B5DC	—	20-73	—	49-12	ᄄ+ᅧ+ᆫ
뗟	U+B5DF	—	20-74	—	—	ᄄ+ᅧ+ᆮ
뗨	U+B5E8	—	20-75	—	49-13	ᄄ+ᅧ+ᆷ
뗩	U+B5E9	—	20-76	—	49-14	ᄄ+ᅧ+ᆸ
뗫	U+B5EB	—	20-77	—	—	ᄄ+ᅧ+ᆺ
뗬	U+B5EC	22-38	—	37-91	—	ᄄ+ᅧ+ᆻ
뗭	U+B5ED	—	20-78	—	49-15	ᄄ+ᅧ+ᆼ
뗴	U+B5F4	—	20-79	—	—	ᄄ+ᅨ+∅
뗸	U+B5F8	—	20-80	—	49-37	ᄄ+ᅨ+ᆫ
똅	U+B605	—	20-81	—	—	ᄄ+ᅨ+ᆸ
똉	U+B609	—	—	—	49-38	ᄄ+ᅨ+ᆼ
또	U+B610	22-39	—	37-92	32-66	ᄄ+ᅩ+∅
똑	U+B611	22-40	—	37-93	32-67	ᄄ+ᅩ+ᆨ
똒	U+B612	—	20-82	—	—	ᄄ+ᅩ+ᆩ
똔	U+B614	22-41	—	37-94	49-16	ᄄ+ᅩ+ᆫ
똗	U+B617	—	20-83	—	49-17	ᄄ+ᅩ+ᆮ
똘	U+B618	22-42	—	38-01	32-68	ᄄ+ᅩ+ᆯ
똙	U+B619	—	20-84	—	—	ᄄ+ᅩ+ᆰ
똚	U+B61A	—	20-85	—	—	ᄄ+ᅩ+ᆱ
똟	U+B61F	—	20-86	—	—	ᄄ+ᅩ+ᆶ
똠	U+B620	—	20-87	38-02	32-69	ᄄ+ᅩ+ᆷ
똡	U+B621	—	20-88	38-03	49-18	ᄄ+ᅩ+ᆸ
똣	U+B623	—	20-89	38-04	49-19	ᄄ+ᅩ+ᆺ
똥	U+B625	22-43	—	38-05	32-70	ᄄ+ᅩ+ᆼ
똬	U+B62C	22-44	—	38-66	33-29	ᄄ+ᅪ+∅
똭	U+B62D	—	20-90	—	49-50	ᄄ+ᅪ+ᆨ
똰	U+B630	—	20-91	38-67	49-51	ᄄ+ᅪ+ᆫ
똴	U+B634	22-45	—	38-68	33-30	ᄄ+ᅪ+ᆯ
뙁	U+B641	—	20-92	—	49-52	ᄄ+ᅪ+ᆼ
뙈	U+B648	22-46	—	38-71	33-31	ᄄ+ᅫ+∅
뙉	U+B649	—	20-93	38-72	49-54	ᄄ+ᅫ+ᆨ
뙌	U+B64C	—	20-94	—	49-55	ᄄ+ᅫ+ᆫ
뙏	U+B64F	—	21-01	—	49-56	ᄄ+ᅫ+ᆮ
뙐	U+B650	—	21-02	—	49-57	ᄄ+ᅫ+ᆯ
뙘	U+B658	—	21-03	—	49-58	ᄄ+ᅫ+ᆷ
뙙	U+B659	—	21-04	—	49-59	ᄄ+ᅫ+ᆸ
뙛	U+B65B	—	21-05	—	—	ᄄ+ᅫ+ᆺ
뙜	U+B65C	—	21-06	—	49-60	ᄄ+ᅫ+ᆻ
뙤	U+B664	22-47	—	38-51	33-17	ᄄ+ᅬ+∅
뙥	U+B665	—	21-07	—	—	ᄄ+ᅬ+ᆨ
뙨	U+B668	22-48	—	38-52	49-39	ᄄ+ᅬ+ᆫ
뙫	U+B66B	—	21-08	—	49-40	ᄄ+ᅬ+ᆮ
뙬	U+B66C	—	21-09	—	49-41	ᄄ+ᅬ+ᆯ
뙴	U+B674	—	21-10	—	49-42	ᄄ+ᅬ+ᆷ
뙵	U+B675	—	21-11	—	49-43	ᄄ+ᅬ+ᆸ
뙷	U+B677	—	21-12	—	49-44	ᄄ+ᅬ+ᆺ
뙸	U+B678	—	21-13	—	49-45	ᄄ+ᅬ+ᆻ
뙹	U+B679	—	21-14	—	33-18	ᄄ+ᅬ+ᆼ
뚀	U+B680	—	21-15	38-06	—	ᄄ+ᅭ+∅
뚁	U+B681	—	21-16	—	49-20	ᄄ+ᅭ+ᆨ
뚜	U+B69C	22-49	—	38-07	32-71	ᄄ+ᅮ+∅
뚝	U+B69D	22-50	—	38-08	32-72	ᄄ+ᅮ+ᆨ
뚠	U+B6A0	22-51	—	38-09	32-73	ᄄ+ᅮ+ᆫ
뚣	U+B6A3	—	21-17	—	49-21	ᄄ+ᅮ+ᆮ
뚤	U+B6A4	22-52	—	38-10	32-74	ᄄ+ᅮ+ᆯ
뚦	U+B6A6	—	21-18	—	49-22	ᄄ+ᅮ+ᆱ
뚧	U+B6A7	—	21-19	—	49-23	ᄄ+ᅮ+ᆲ
뚫	U+B6AB	22-53	—	38-11	32-75	ᄄ+ᅮ+ᆶ
뚬	U+B6AC	22-54	—	38-12	32-76	ᄄ+ᅮ+ᆷ
뚭	U+B6AD	—	21-20	38-13	32-77	ᄄ+ᅮ+ᆸ
뚯	U+B6AF	—	21-21	—	49-24	ᄄ+ᅮ+ᆺ
뚱	U+B6B1	22-55	—	38-14	32-78	ᄄ+ᅮ+ᆼ
뚵	U+B6B5	—	21-22	—	49-25	ᄄ+ᅮ+ᇀ
뚸	U+B6B8	—	21-23	38-69	—	ᄄ+ᅯ+∅
뚼	U+B6BC	—	21-24	—	49-53	ᄄ+ᅯ+ᆫ
뚿	U+B6BF	—	21-25	—	—	ᄄ+ᅯ+ᆮ
뛋	U+B6CB	—	21-26	—	—	ᄄ+ᅯ+ᆺ
뛌	U+B6CC	—	—	38-70	—	ᄄ+ᅯ+ᆻ
뛔	U+B6D4	22-56	—	38-73	49-61	ᄄ+ᅰ+∅
뛘	U+B6D8	—	21-27	—	49-62	ᄄ+ᅰ+ᆫ
뛛	U+B6DB	—	21-28	—	49-63	ᄄ+ᅰ+ᆮ
뛜	U+B6DC	—	21-29	—	49-64	ᄄ+ᅰ+ᆯ
뛤	U+B6E4	—	21-30	—	49-65	ᄄ+ᅰ+ᆷ
뛥	U+B6E5	—	21-31	—	49-66	ᄄ+ᅰ+ᆸ
뛨	U+B6E8	—	21-32	—	49-68	ᄄ+ᅰ+ᆻ
뛩	U+B6E9	—	21-33	—	49-67	ᄄ+ᅰ+ᆼ
뛰	U+B6F0	22-57	—	38-53	33-19	ᄄ+ᅱ+∅
뛴	U+B6F4	22-58	—	38-54	33-20	ᄄ+ᅱ+ᆫ
뛷	U+B6F7	—	21-34	—	49-46	ᄄ+ᅱ+ᆮ
뛸	U+B6F8	22-59	—	38-55	33-21	ᄄ+ᅱ+ᆯ
뜀	U+B700	22-60	—	38-56	33-22	ᄄ+ᅱ+ᆷ
뜁	U+B701	22-61	—	38-57	33-23	ᄄ+ᅱ+ᆸ
뜃	U+B703	—	21-35	—	49-47	ᄄ+ᅱ+ᆺ
뜅	U+B705	22-62	—	38-58	49-48	ᄄ+ᅱ+ᆼ
뜌	U+B70C	—	21-36	38-15	32-79	ᄄ+ᅲ+∅
뜍	U+B70D	—	21-37	—	49-26	ᄄ+ᅲ+ᆨ
뜔	U+B714	—	21-38	—	49-27	ᄄ+ᅲ+ᆯ
뜜	U+B71C	—	21-39	—	—	ᄄ+ᅲ+ᆷ
뜡	U+B721	—	21-40	—	49-28	ᄄ+ᅲ+ᆼ
뜨	U+B728	22-63	—	38-16	32-80	ᄄ+ᅳ+∅
뜩	U+B729	22-64	—	38-17	32-81	ᄄ+ᅳ+ᆨ
뜬	U+B72C	22-65	—	38-18	32-82	ᄄ+ᅳ+ᆫ
뜯	U+B72F	22-66	—	38-19	32-83	ᄄ+ᅳ+ᆮ
뜰	U+B730	22-67	—	38-20	32-84	ᄄ+ᅳ+ᆯ
뜲	U+B732	—	21-41	—	—	ᄄ+ᅳ+ᆱ
뜳	U+B733	—	21-42	—	—	ᄄ+ᅳ+ᆲ
뜷	U+B737	—	21-43	—	—	ᄄ+ᅳ+ᆶ
뜸	U+B738	22-68	—	38-21	32-85	ᄄ+ᅳ+ᆷ
뜹	U+B739	22-69	—	38-22	32-86	ᄄ+ᅳ+ᆸ
뜻	U+B73B	22-70	—	38-23	32-87	ᄄ+ᅳ+ᆺ
뜽	U+B73D	—	21-44	38-24	49-29	ᄄ+ᅳ+ᆼ
띄	U+B744	22-71	—	38-59	33-24	ᄄ+ᅴ+∅
띅	U+B745	—	—	38-60	—	ᄄ+ᅴ+ᆨ
띈	U+B748	22-72	—	38-61	33-25	ᄄ+ᅴ+ᆫ
띌	U+B74C	22-73	—	38-62	33-26	ᄄ+ᅴ+ᆯ
띔	U+B754	22-74	—	38-63	33-27	ᄄ+ᅴ+ᆷ
띕	U+B755	22-75	—	38-64	33-28	ᄄ+ᅴ+ᆸ
띙	U+B759	—	21-45	38-65	49-49	ᄄ+ᅴ+ᆼ
띠	U+B760	22-76	—	38-25	32-88	ᄄ+ᅵ+∅
띡	U+B761	—	21-46	38-26	49-30	ᄄ+ᅵ+ᆨ
띤	U+B764	22-77	—	38-27	32-89	ᄄ+ᅵ+ᆫ
띧	U+B767	—	21-47	—	49-31	ᄄ+ᅵ+ᆮ
띨	U+B768	22-78	—	38-28	32-90	ᄄ+ᅵ+ᆯ
띰	U+B770	22-79	—	38-29	32-91	ᄄ+ᅵ+ᆷ
띱	U+B771	22-80	—	38-30	32-92	ᄄ+ᅵ+ᆸ
띳	U+B773	22-81	—	38-31	49-32	ᄄ+ᅵ+ᆺ
띵	U+B775	22-82	—	38-32	32-93	ᄄ+ᅵ+ᆼ
띻	U+B77B	—	21-48	—	49-33	ᄄ+ᅵ+ᇂ
라	U+B77C	22-83	—	21-25	20-31	ᄅ+ᅡ+∅
락	U+B77D	22-84	—	21-26	20-32	ᄅ+ᅡ+ᆨ
란	U+B780	22-85	—	21-27	20-33	ᄅ+ᅡ+ᆫ
랃	U+B783	—	21-49	—	40-57	ᄅ+ᅡ+ᆮ
랄	U+B784	22-86	—	21-28	20-34	ᄅ+ᅡ+ᆯ
랈	U+B788	—	21-50	—	40-58	ᄅ+ᅡ+ᆳ
람	U+B78C	22-87	—	21-29	20-35	ᄅ+ᅡ+ᆷ
랍	U+B78D	22-88	—	21-30	20-36	ᄅ+ᅡ+ᆸ
랏	U+B78F	22-89	—	21-31	20-37	ᄅ+ᅡ+ᆺ
랐	U+B790	22-90	—	21-36	20-40	ᄅ+ᅡ+ᆻ
랑	U+B791	22-91	—	21-32	20-38	ᄅ+ᅡ+ᆼ
랒	U+B792	22-92	—	21-33	40-59	ᄅ+ᅡ+ᆽ
랓	U+B793	—	21-51	—	40-60	ᄅ+ᅡ+ᆾ
랔	U+B794	—	21-52	—	—	ᄅ+ᅡ+ᆿ
랕	U+B795	—	21-53	—	40-61	ᄅ+ᅡ+ᇀ
랖	U+B796	22-93	—	21-34	40-62	ᄅ+ᅡ+ᇁ
랗	U+B797	22-94	—	21-35	20-39	ᄅ+ᅡ+ᇂ
래	U+B798	23-01	—	22-23	21-11	ᄅ+ᅢ+∅
랙	U+B799	23-02	—	22-24	40-92	ᄅ+ᅢ+ᆨ
랜	U+B79C	23-03	—	22-25	21-12	ᄅ+ᅢ+ᆫ
랟	U+B79F	—	21-54	—	40-93	ᄅ+ᅢ+ᆮ
랠	U+B7A0	23-04	—	22-26	21-13	ᄅ+ᅢ+ᆯ
램	U+B7A8	23-05	—	22-27	21-14	ᄅ+ᅢ+ᆷ
랩	U+B7A9	23-06	—	22-28	21-15	ᄅ+ᅢ+ᆸ
랫	U+B7AB	23-07	—	22-29	21-16	ᄅ+ᅢ+ᆺ
랬	U+B7AC	23-08	—	22-31	21-18	ᄅ+ᅢ+ᆻ
랭	U+B7AD	23-09	—	22-30	21-17	ᄅ+ᅢ+ᆼ
랰	U+B7B0	—	21-55	—	—	ᄅ+ᅢ+ᆿ
랱	U+B7B1	—	21-56	—	—	ᄅ+ᅢ+ᇀ
랲	U+B7B2	—	21-57	—	—	ᄅ+ᅢ+ᇁ
랴	U+B7B4	23-10	—	21-37	20-41	ᄅ+ᅣ+∅
략	U+B7B5	23-11	—	21-38	20-42	ᄅ+ᅣ+ᆨ
랸	U+B7B8	23-12	—	21-39	40-63	ᄅ+ᅣ+ᆫ
랻	U+B7BB	—	21-58	—	—	ᄅ+ᅣ+ᆮ
랼	U+B7BC	—	21-59	21-40	40-64	ᄅ+ᅣ+ᆯ
럄	U+B7C4	—	21-60	21-41	40-65	ᄅ+ᅣ+ᆷ
럅	U+B7C5	—	21-61	21-42	40-66	ᄅ+ᅣ+ᆸ
럇	U+B7C7	23-13	—	21-43	—	ᄅ+ᅣ+ᆺ
량	U+B7C9	23-14	—	21-44	20-43	ᄅ+ᅣ+ᆼ
럐	U+B7D0	—	21-62	22-32	—	ᄅ+ᅤ+∅
럣	U+B7E3	—	21-63	—	—	ᄅ+ᅤ+ᆺ
러	U+B7EC	23-15	—	21-45	20-44	ᄅ+ᅥ+∅
럭	U+B7ED	23-16	—	21-46	20-45	ᄅ+ᅥ+ᆨ
런	U+B7F0	23-17	—	21-47	20-46	ᄅ+ᅥ+ᆫ
럲	U+B7F2	—	21-64	—	—	ᄅ+ᅥ+ᆭ
럳	U+B7F3	—	21-65	—	40-67	ᄅ+ᅥ+ᆮ
럴	U+B7F4	23-18	—	21-48	20-47	ᄅ+ᅥ+ᆯ
럼	U+B7FC	23-19	—	21-49	20-48	ᄅ+ᅥ+ᆷ
럽	U+B7FD	23-20	—	21-50	20-49	ᄅ+ᅥ+ᆸ
럾	U+B7FE	—	21-66	—	—	ᄅ+ᅥ+ᆹ
럿	U+B7FF	23-21	—	21-51	20-50	ᄅ+ᅥ+ᆺ
렀	U+B800	23-22	—	21-55	20-53	ᄅ+ᅥ+ᆻ
렁	U+B801	23-23	—	21-52	20-51	ᄅ+ᅥ+ᆼ
렂	U+B802	—	21-67	—	40-68	ᄅ+ᅥ+ᆽ
렄	U+B804	—	21-68	—	—	ᄅ+ᅥ+ᆿ
렆	U+B806	—	21-69	21-53	40-69	ᄅ+ᅥ+ᇁ
렇	U+B807	23-24	—	21-54	20-52	ᄅ+ᅥ+ᇂ
레	U+B808	23-25	—	22-33	21-19	ᄅ+ᅦ+∅
렉	U+B809	23-26	—	22-34	21-20	ᄅ+ᅦ+ᆨ
렌	U+B80C	23-27	—	22-35	21-21	ᄅ+ᅦ+ᆫ
렏	U+B80F	—	21-70	—	40-94	ᄅ+ᅦ+ᆮ
렐	U+B810	23-28	—	22-36	41-01	ᄅ+ᅦ+ᆯ
렘	U+B818	23-29	—	22-37	21-22	ᄅ+ᅦ+ᆷ
렙	U+B819	23-30	—	22-38	21-23	ᄅ+ᅦ+ᆸ
렛	U+B81B	23-31	—	22-39	21-24	ᄅ+ᅦ+ᆺ
렜	U+B81C	—	21-71	22-41	—	ᄅ+ᅦ+ᆻ
렝	U+B81D	23-32	—	22-40	21-25	ᄅ+ᅦ+ᆼ
렡	U+B821	—	21-72	—	41-02	ᄅ+ᅦ+ᇀ
렢	U+B822	—	21-73	—	—	ᄅ+ᅦ+ᇁ
렣	U+B823	—	21-74	—	—	ᄅ+ᅦ+ᇂ
려	U+B824	23-33	—	21-56	20-54	ᄅ+ᅧ+∅
력	U+B825	23-34	—	21-57	20-55	ᄅ+ᅧ+ᆨ
련	U+B828	23-35	—	21-58	20-56	ᄅ+ᅧ+ᆫ
렫	U+B82B	—	21-75	—	40-70	ᄅ+ᅧ+ᆮ
렬	U+B82C	23-36	—	21-59	20-57	ᄅ+ᅧ+ᆯ
렰	U+B830	—	21-76	—	40-71	ᄅ+ᅧ+ᆳ
렴	U+B834	23-37	—	21-60	20-58	ᄅ+ᅧ+ᆷ
렵	U+B835	23-38	—	21-61	20-59	ᄅ+ᅧ+ᆸ
렷	U+B837	23-39	—	21-62	20-60	ᄅ+ᅧ+ᆺ
렸	U+B838	23-40	—	21-64	20-62	ᄅ+ᅧ+ᆻ
령	U+B839	23-41	—	21-63	20-61	ᄅ+ᅧ+ᆼ
렼	U+B83C	—	21-77	—	40-72	ᄅ+ᅧ+ᆿ
렾	U+B83E	—	21-78	—	40-73	ᄅ+ᅧ+ᇁ
례	U+B840	23-42	—	22-42	21-26	ᄅ+ᅨ+∅
롁	U+B841	—	21-79	—	—	ᄅ+ᅨ+ᆨ
롄	U+B844	23-43	—	22-43	41-03	ᄅ+ᅨ+ᆫ
롇	U+B847	—	21-80	—	—	ᄅ+ᅨ+ᆮ
롈	U+B848	—	21-81	22-44	41-04	ᄅ+ᅨ+ᆯ
롐	U+B850	—	21-82	—	41-05	ᄅ+ᅨ+ᆷ
롑	U+B851	23-44	—	22-45	41-06	ᄅ+ᅨ+ᆸ
롓	U+B853	23-45	—	22-46	41-07	ᄅ+ᅨ+ᆺ
롕	U+B855	—	21-83	—	41-08	ᄅ+ᅨ+ᆼ
로	U+B85C	23-46	—	21-65	20-63	ᄅ+ᅩ+∅
록	U+B85D	23-47	—	21-66	20-64	ᄅ+ᅩ+ᆨ
론	U+B860	23-48	—	21-67	20-65	ᄅ+ᅩ+ᆫ
롣	U+B863	—	21-84	—	40-74	ᄅ+ᅩ+ᆮ
롤	U+B864	23-49	—	21-68	20-66	ᄅ+ᅩ+ᆯ
롨	U+B868	—	21-85	—	40-75	ᄅ+ᅩ+ᆳ
롫	U+B86B	—	21-86	—	—	ᄅ+ᅩ+ᆶ
롬	U+B86C	23-50	—	21-69	20-67	ᄅ+ᅩ+ᆷ
롭	U+B86D	23-51	—	21-70	20-68	ᄅ+ᅩ+ᆸ
롯	U+B86F	23-52	—	21-71	20-69	ᄅ+ᅩ+ᆺ
롱	U+B871	23-53	—	21-72	20-70	ᄅ+ᅩ+ᆼ
롴	U+B874	—	21-87	—	—	ᄅ+ᅩ+ᆿ
롶	U+B876	—	21-88	21-73	40-76	ᄅ+ᅩ+ᇁ
롷	U+B877	—	21-89	—	—	ᄅ+ᅩ+ᇂ
롸	U+B878	23-54	—	22-66	21-33	ᄅ+ᅪ+∅
롹	U+B879	—	21-90	—	41-23	ᄅ+ᅪ+ᆨ
롼	U+B87C	23-55	—	22-67	41-24	ᄅ+ᅪ+ᆫ
뢀	U+B880	—	21-91	—	41-25	ᄅ+ᅪ+ᆯ
뢈	U+B888	—	21-92	—	—	ᄅ+ᅪ+ᆷ
뢉	U+B889	—	21-93	22-68	—	ᄅ+ᅪ+ᆸ
뢋	U+B88B	—	21-94	—	—	ᄅ+ᅪ+ᆺ
뢌	U+B88C	—	22-01	—	—	ᄅ+ᅪ+ᆻ
뢍	U+B88D	23-56	—	22-69	41-26	ᄅ+ᅪ+ᆼ
뢔	U+B894	—	22-02	22-72	41-30	ᄅ+ᅫ+∅
뢘	U+B898	—	22-03	—	—	ᄅ+ᅫ+ᆫ
뢛	U+B89B	—	22-04	—	—	ᄅ+ᅫ+ᆮ
뢜	U+B89C	—	22-05	—	—	ᄅ+ᅫ+ᆯ
뢧	U+B8A7	—	22-06	—	—	ᄅ+ᅫ+ᆺ
뢨	U+B8A8	23-57	—	22-73	—	ᄅ+ᅫ+ᆻ
뢰	U+B8B0	23-58	—	22-47	21-27	ᄅ+ᅬ+∅
뢱	U+B8B1	—	22-07	—	41-09	ᄅ+ᅬ+ᆨ
뢴	U+B8B4	23-59	—	22-48	21-28	ᄅ+ᅬ+ᆫ
뢵	U+B8B5	—	22-08	—	—	ᄅ+ᅬ+ᆬ
뢷	U+B8B7	—	22-09	—	41-10	ᄅ+ᅬ+ᆮ
뢸	U+B8B8	23-60	—	22-49	21-29	ᄅ+ᅬ+ᆯ
룀	U+B8C0	23-61	—	22-50	41-11	ᄅ+ᅬ+ᆷ
룁	U+B8C1	23-62	—	22-51	21-30	ᄅ+ᅬ+ᆸ
룃	U+B8C3	23-63	—	22-52	41-12	ᄅ+ᅬ+ᆺ
룄	U+B8C4	—	22-10	22-54	41-14	ᄅ+ᅬ+ᆻ
룅	U+B8C5	23-64	—	22-53	41-13	ᄅ+ᅬ+ᆼ
료	U+B8CC	23-65	—	21-74	20-71	ᄅ+ᅭ+∅
룍	U+B8CD	—	22-11	—	40-77	ᄅ+ᅭ+ᆨ
룐	U+B8D0	23-66	—	21-75	40-78	ᄅ+ᅭ+ᆫ
룓	U+B8D3	—	22-12	—	—	ᄅ+ᅭ+ᆮ
룔	U+B8D4	23-67	—	21-76	40-79	ᄅ+ᅭ+ᆯ
룜	U+B8DC	—	22-13	21-77	40-80	ᄅ+ᅭ+ᆷ
룝	U+B8DD	23-68	—	21-78	40-81	ᄅ+ᅭ+ᆸ
룟	U+B8DF	23-69	—	21-79	—	ᄅ+ᅭ+ᆺ
룡	U+B8E1	23-70	—	21-80	20-72	ᄅ+ᅭ+ᆼ
루	U+B8E8	23-71	—	21-81	20-73	ᄅ+ᅮ+∅
룩	U+B8E9	23-72	—	21-82	20-74	ᄅ+ᅮ+ᆨ
룬	U+B8EC	23-73	—	21-83	20-75	ᄅ+ᅮ+ᆫ
룯	U+B8EF	—	22-14	—	40-82	ᄅ+ᅮ+ᆮ
룰	U+B8F0	23-74	—	21-84	20-76	ᄅ+ᅮ+ᆯ
룳	U+B8F3	—	22-15	—	—	ᄅ+ᅮ+ᆲ
룸	U+B8F8	23-75	—	21-85	20-77	ᄅ+ᅮ+ᆷ
룹	U+B8F9	23-76	—	21-86	20-78	ᄅ+ᅮ+ᆸ
룻	U+B8FB	23-77	—	21-87	20-79	ᄅ+ᅮ+ᆺ
룽	U+B8FD	23-78	—	21-88	20-80	ᄅ+ᅮ+ᆼ
뤀	U+B900	—	22-16	—	—	ᄅ+ᅮ+ᆿ
뤂	U+B902	—	22-17	—	—	ᄅ+ᅮ+ᇁ
뤄	U+B904	23-79	—	22-70	21-34	ᄅ+ᅯ+∅
뤅	U+B905	—	22-18	—	—	ᄅ+ᅯ+ᆨ
뤈	U+B908	—	22-19	—	41-27	ᄅ+ᅯ+ᆫ
뤋	U+B90B	—	22-20	—	41-28	ᄅ+ᅯ+ᆮ
뤌	U+B90C	—	22-21	—	41-29	ᄅ+ᅯ+ᆯ
뤔	U+B914	—	22-22	—	—	ᄅ+ᅯ+ᆷ
뤕	U+B915	—	22-23	—	—	ᄅ+ᅯ+ᆸ
뤗	U+B917	—	22-24	—	—	ᄅ+ᅯ+ᆺ
뤘	U+B918	23-80	—	22-71	21-35	ᄅ+ᅯ+ᆻ
뤙	U+B919	—	22-25	—	—	ᄅ+ᅯ+ᆼ
뤠	U+B920	23-81	—	22-74	41-31	ᄅ+ᅰ+∅
뤡	U+B921	—	22-26	—	—	ᄅ+ᅰ+ᆨ
뤤	U+B924	—	22-27	—	41-32	ᄅ+ᅰ+ᆫ
뤨	U+B928	—	22-28	—	41-33	ᄅ+ᅰ+ᆯ
뤰	U+B930	—	22-29	—	41-34	ᄅ+ᅰ+ᆷ
뤱	U+B931	—	22-30	—	41-35	ᄅ+ᅰ+ᆸ
뤳	U+B933	—	22-31	—	41-36	ᄅ+ᅰ+ᆺ
뤴	U+B934	—	22-32	—	41-37	ᄅ+ᅰ+ᆻ
뤵	U+B935	—	22-33	—	—	ᄅ+ᅰ+ᆼ
뤼	U+B93C	23-82	—	22-55	21-31	ᄅ+ᅱ+∅
뤽	U+B93D	23-83	—	22-56	41-15	ᄅ+ᅱ+ᆨ
륀	U+B940	23-84	—	22-57	41-16	ᄅ+ᅱ+ᆫ
륃	U+B943	—	22-34	—	—	ᄅ+ᅱ+ᆮ
륄	U+B944	23-85	—	22-58	41-17	ᄅ+ᅱ+ᆯ
륌	U+B94C	23-86	—	22-59	41-18	ᄅ+ᅱ+ᆷ
륍	U+B94D	—	22-35	—	—	ᄅ+ᅱ+ᆸ
륏	U+B94F	23-87	—	22-60	—	ᄅ+ᅱ+ᆺ
륐	U+B950	—	22-36	—	—	ᄅ+ᅱ+ᆻ
륑	U+B951	23-88	—	22-61	41-19	ᄅ+ᅱ+ᆼ
류	U+B958	23-89	—	21-89	20-81	ᄅ+ᅲ+∅
륙	U+B959	23-90	—	21-90	20-82	ᄅ+ᅲ+ᆨ
륜	U+B95C	23-91	—	21-91	20-83	ᄅ+ᅲ+ᆫ
륟	U+B95F	—	22-37	—	40-83	ᄅ+ᅲ+ᆮ
률	U+B960	23-92	—	21-92	20-84	ᄅ+ᅲ+ᆯ
륨	U+B968	23-93	—	21-93	20-85	ᄅ+ᅲ+ᆷ
륩	U+B969	23-94	—	21-94	40-84	ᄅ+ᅲ+ᆸ
륫	U+B96B	24-01	—	22-01	40-85	ᄅ+ᅲ+ᆺ
륭	U+B96D	24-02	—	22-02	20-86	ᄅ+ᅲ+ᆼ
르	U+B974	24-03	—	22-03	20-87	ᄅ+ᅳ+∅
륵	U+B975	24-04	—	22-04	20-88	ᄅ+ᅳ+ᆨ
른	U+B978	24-05	—	22-05	20-89	ᄅ+ᅳ+ᆫ
륻	U+B97B	—	22-38	—	40-86	ᄅ+ᅳ+ᆮ
를	U+B97C	24-06	—	22-06	20-90	ᄅ+ᅳ+ᆯ
륽	U+B97D	—	22-39	—	—	ᄅ+ᅳ+ᆰ
릀	U+B980	—	22-40	—	40-87	ᄅ+ᅳ+ᆳ
름	U+B984	24-07	—	22-07	20-91	ᄅ+ᅳ+ᆷ
릅	U+B985	24-08	—	22-08	20-92	ᄅ+ᅳ+ᆸ
릇	U+B987	24-09	—	22-09	20-93	ᄅ+ᅳ+ᆺ
릉	U+B989	24-10	—	22-10	20-94	ᄅ+ᅳ+ᆼ
릊	U+B98A	24-11	—	22-11	21-01	ᄅ+ᅳ+ᆽ
릋	U+B98B	—	22-41	—	40-88	ᄅ+ᅳ+ᆾ
릍	U+B98D	24-12	—	22-12	40-89	ᄅ+ᅳ+ᇀ
릎	U+B98E	24-13	—	22-13	21-02	ᄅ+ᅳ+ᇁ
릏	U+B98F	—	22-42	—	—	ᄅ+ᅳ+ᇂ
릐	U+B990	—	22-43	22-62	21-32	ᄅ+ᅴ+∅
릑	U+B991	—	22-44	—	—	ᄅ+ᅴ+ᆨ
릔	U+B994	—	22-45	22-63	41-20	ᄅ+ᅴ+ᆫ
릘	U+B998	—	22-46	22-64	—	ᄅ+ᅴ+ᆯ
릞	U+B99E	—	22-47	—	—	ᄅ+ᅴ+ᆵ
릠	U+B9A0	—	22-48	22-65	41-21	ᄅ+ᅴ+ᆷ
릡	U+B9A1	—	22-49	—	—	ᄅ+ᅴ+ᆸ
릣	U+B9A3	—	22-50	—	41-22	ᄅ+ᅴ+ᆺ
릥	U+B9A5	—	22-51	—	—	ᄅ+ᅴ+ᆼ
리	U+B9AC	24-14	—	22-14	21-03	ᄅ+ᅵ+∅
릭	U+B9AD	24-15	—	22-15	21-04	ᄅ+ᅵ+ᆨ
린	U+B9B0	24-16	—	22-16	21-05	ᄅ+ᅵ+ᆫ
릳	U+B9B3	—	22-52	—	40-90	ᄅ+ᅵ+ᆮ
릴	U+B9B4	24-17	—	22-17	21-06	ᄅ+ᅵ+ᆯ
림	U+B9BC	24-18	—	22-18	21-07	ᄅ+ᅵ+ᆷ
립	U+B9BD	24-19	—	22-19	21-08	ᄅ+ᅵ+ᆸ
릾	U+B9BE	—	22-53	—	—	ᄅ+ᅵ+ᆹ
릿	U+B9BF	24-20	—	22-20	21-09	ᄅ+ᅵ+ᆺ
맀	U+B9C0	—	22-54	—	—	ᄅ+ᅵ+ᆻ
링	U+B9C1	24-21	—	22-21	21-10	ᄅ+ᅵ+ᆼ
맄	U+B9C4	—	22-55	—	—	ᄅ+ᅵ+ᆿ
맆	U+B9C6	—	22-56	22-22	40-91	ᄅ+ᅵ+ᇁ
마	U+B9C8	24-22	—	22-75	21-37	ᄆ+ᅡ+∅
막	U+B9C9	24-23	—	22-76	21-38	ᄆ+ᅡ+ᆨ
맊	U+B9CA	—	22-57	—	—	ᄆ+ᅡ+ᆩ
만	U+B9CC	24-24	—	22-77	21-39	ᄆ+ᅡ+ᆫ
많	U+B9CE	24-25	—	22-78	21-40	ᄆ+ᅡ+ᆭ
맏	U+B9CF	24-26	—	22-79	21-41	ᄆ+ᅡ+ᆮ
말	U+B9D0	24-27	—	22-80	21-42	ᄆ+ᅡ+ᆯ
맑	U+B9D1	24-28	—	22-81	21-43	ᄆ+ᅡ+ᆰ
맒	U+B9D2	24-29	—	22-82	21-44	ᄆ+ᅡ+ᆱ
맔	U+B9D4	—	22-58	—	41-38	ᄆ+ᅡ+ᆳ
맘	U+B9D8	24-30	—	22-83	21-45	ᄆ+ᅡ+ᆷ
맙	U+B9D9	24-31	—	22-84	21-46	ᄆ+ᅡ+ᆸ
맛	U+B9DB	24-32	—	22-85	21-47	ᄆ+ᅡ+ᆺ
맜	U+B9DC	—	22-59	—	—	ᄆ+ᅡ+ᆻ
망	U+B9DD	24-33	—	22-86	21-48	ᄆ+ᅡ+ᆼ
맞	U+B9DE	24-34	—	22-87	21-49	ᄆ+ᅡ+ᆽ
맟	U+B9DF	—	22-60	22-88	41-39	ᄆ+ᅡ+ᆾ
맠	U+B9E0	—	22-61	—	—	ᄆ+ᅡ+ᆿ
맡	U+B9E1	24-35	—	22-89	21-50	ᄆ+ᅡ+ᇀ
맢	U+B9E2	—	22-62	—	—	ᄆ+ᅡ+ᇁ
맣	U+B9E3	24-36	—	22-90	21-51	ᄆ+ᅡ+ᇂ
매	U+B9E4	24-37	—	23-84	22-22	ᄆ+ᅢ+∅
맥	U+B9E5	24-38	—	23-85	22-23	ᄆ+ᅢ+ᆨ
맧	U+B9E7	—	—	—	41-73	ᄆ+ᅢ+ᆪ
맨	U+B9E8	24-39	—	23-86	22-24	ᄆ+ᅢ+ᆫ
맫	U+B9EB	—	22-63	—	41-74	ᄆ+ᅢ+ᆮ
맬	U+B9EC	24-40	—	23-87	22-25	ᄆ+ᅢ+ᆯ
맭	U+B9ED	—	22-64	—	—	ᄆ+ᅢ+ᆰ
맴	U+B9F4	24-41	—	23-88	22-26	ᄆ+ᅢ+ᆷ
맵	U+B9F5	24-42	—	23-89	22-27	ᄆ+ᅢ+ᆸ
맷	U+B9F7	24-43	—	23-90	22-28	ᄆ+ᅢ+ᆺ
맸	U+B9F8	24-44	—	23-93	22-31	ᄆ+ᅢ+ᆻ
맹	U+B9F9	24-45	—	23-91	22-29	ᄆ+ᅢ+ᆼ
맺	U+B9FA	24-46	—	23-92	22-30	ᄆ+ᅢ+ᆽ
맻	U+B9FB	—	22-65	—	—	ᄆ+ᅢ+ᆾ
맽	U+B9FD	—	22-66	—	—	ᄆ+ᅢ+ᇀ
맾	U+B9FE	—	22-67	—	—	ᄆ+ᅢ+ᇁ
먀	U+BA00	24-47	—	22-91	21-52	ᄆ+ᅣ+∅
먁	U+BA01	24-48	—	22-92	41-40	ᄆ+ᅣ+ᆨ
먄	U+BA04	—	22-68	22-93	41-41	ᄆ+ᅣ+ᆫ
먈	U+BA08	24-49	—	22-94	21-53	ᄆ+ᅣ+ᆯ
먐	U+BA10	—	22-69	23-01	41-42	ᄆ+ᅣ+ᆷ
먑	U+BA11	—	22-70	—	—	ᄆ+ᅣ+ᆸ
먓	U+BA13	—	22-71	—	—	ᄆ+ᅣ+ᆺ
먕	U+BA15	24-50	—	23-02	41-43	ᄆ+ᅣ+ᆼ
먘	U+BA18	—	22-72	—	—	ᄆ+ᅣ+ᆿ
먜	U+BA1C	—	22-73	23-94	41-75	ᄆ+ᅤ+∅
머	U+BA38	24-51	—	23-03	21-54	ᄆ+ᅥ+∅
먹	U+BA39	24-52	—	23-04	21-55	ᄆ+ᅥ+ᆨ
먻	U+BA3B	—	22-74	—	—	ᄆ+ᅥ+ᆪ
먼	U+BA3C	24-53	—	23-05	21-56	ᄆ+ᅥ+ᆫ
먿	U+BA3F	—	22-75	—	41-44	ᄆ+ᅥ+ᆮ
멀	U+BA40	24-54	—	23-06	21-57	ᄆ+ᅥ+ᆯ
멁	U+BA41	—	22-76	23-07	—	ᄆ+ᅥ+ᆰ
멂	U+BA42	24-55	—	23-08	21-58	ᄆ+ᅥ+ᆱ
멈	U+BA48	24-56	—	23-09	21-59	ᄆ+ᅥ+ᆷ
멉	U+BA49	24-57	—	23-10	21-60	ᄆ+ᅥ+ᆸ
멋	U+BA4B	24-58	—	23-11	21-61	ᄆ+ᅥ+ᆺ
멌	U+BA4C	—	22-77	23-15	—	ᄆ+ᅥ+ᆻ
멍	U+BA4D	24-59	—	23-12	21-62	ᄆ+ᅥ+ᆼ
멎	U+BA4E	24-60	—	23-13	21-63	ᄆ+ᅥ+ᆽ
멏	U+BA4F	—	22-78	—	—	ᄆ+ᅥ+ᆾ
멓	U+BA53	24-61	—	23-14	21-64	ᄆ+ᅥ+ᇂ
메	U+BA54	24-62	—	24-01	22-32	ᄆ+ᅦ+∅
멕	U+BA55	24-63	—	24-02	22-33	ᄆ+ᅦ+ᆨ
멘	U+BA58	24-64	—	24-03	22-34	ᄆ+ᅦ+ᆫ
멛	U+BA5B	—	22-79	—	41-76	ᄆ+ᅦ+ᆮ
멜	U+BA5C	24-65	—	24-04	22-35	ᄆ+ᅦ+ᆯ
멠	U+BA60	—	22-80	—	—	ᄆ+ᅦ+ᆳ
멤	U+BA64	24-66	—	24-05	22-36	ᄆ+ᅦ+ᆷ
멥	U+BA65	24-67	—	24-06	22-37	ᄆ+ᅦ+ᆸ
멧	U+BA67	24-68	—	24-07	22-38	ᄆ+ᅦ+ᆺ
멨	U+BA68	24-69	—	24-09	22-39	ᄆ+ᅦ+ᆻ
멩	U+BA69	24-70	—	24-08	41-77	ᄆ+ᅦ+ᆼ
멪	U+BA6A	—	22-81	—	—	ᄆ+ᅦ+ᆽ
멫	U+BA6B	—	22-82	—	41-78	ᄆ+ᅦ+ᆾ
멭	U+BA6D	—	22-83	—	—	ᄆ+ᅦ+ᇀ
며	U+BA70	24-71	—	23-16	21-65	ᄆ+ᅧ+∅
멱	U+BA71	24-72	—	23-17	21-66	ᄆ+ᅧ+ᆨ
면	U+BA74	24-73	—	23-18	21-67	ᄆ+ᅧ+ᆫ
멷	U+BA77	—	22-84	—	41-45	ᄆ+ᅧ+ᆮ
멸	U+BA78	24-74	—	23-19	21-68	ᄆ+ᅧ+ᆯ
멺	U+BA7A	—	22-85	—	—	ᄆ+ᅧ+ᆱ
몀	U+BA80	—	22-86	23-20	41-46	ᄆ+ᅧ+ᆷ
몁	U+BA81	—	22-87	23-21	41-47	ᄆ+ᅧ+ᆸ
몃	U+BA83	24-75	—	23-22	21-69	ᄆ+ᅧ+ᆺ
몄	U+BA84	24-76	—	23-25	21-72	ᄆ+ᅧ+ᆻ
명	U+BA85	24-77	—	23-23	21-70	ᄆ+ᅧ+ᆼ
몇	U+BA87	24-78	—	23-24	21-71	ᄆ+ᅧ+ᆾ
몉	U+BA89	—	22-88	—	—	ᄆ+ᅧ+ᇀ
몌	U+BA8C	24-79	—	24-10	41-79	ᄆ+ᅨ+∅
몍	U+BA8D	—	22-89	—	—	ᄆ+ᅨ+ᆨ
몐	U+BA90	—	22-90	24-11	41-80	ᄆ+ᅨ+ᆫ
몓	U+BA93	—	22-91	—	41-81	ᄆ+ᅨ+ᆮ
몔	U+BA94	—	22-92	—	41-82	ᄆ+ᅨ+ᆯ
몜	U+BA9C	—	22-93	—	—	ᄆ+ᅨ+ᆷ
몝	U+BA9D	—	22-94	—	—	ᄆ+ᅨ+ᆸ
몟	U+BA9F	—	23-01	—	41-83	ᄆ+ᅨ+ᆺ
몡	U+BAA1	—	23-02	—	41-84	ᄆ+ᅨ+ᆼ
몣	U+BAA3	—	23-03	—	—	ᄆ+ᅨ+ᆾ
몥	U+BAA5	—	23-04	—	—	ᄆ+ᅨ+ᇀ
몦	U+BAA6	—	23-05	—	—	ᄆ+ᅨ+ᇁ
모	U+BAA8	24-80	—	23-26	21-73	ᄆ+ᅩ+∅
목	U+BAA9	24-81	—	23-27	21-74	ᄆ+ᅩ+ᆨ
몫	U+BAAB	24-82	—	23-28	21-75	ᄆ+ᅩ+ᆪ
몬	U+BAAC	24-83	—	23-29	21-76	ᄆ+ᅩ+ᆫ
몯	U+BAAF	—	23-06	23-30	41-48	ᄆ+ᅩ+ᆮ
몰	U+BAB0	24-84	—	23-31	21-77	ᄆ+ᅩ+ᆯ
몱	U+BAB1	—	23-07	—	41-49	ᄆ+ᅩ+ᆰ
몲	U+BAB2	24-85	—	23-32	21-78	ᄆ+ᅩ+ᆱ
몴	U+BAB4	—	23-08	—	41-50	ᄆ+ᅩ+ᆳ
몸	U+BAB8	24-86	—	23-33	21-79	ᄆ+ᅩ+ᆷ
몹	U+BAB9	24-87	—	23-34	21-80	ᄆ+ᅩ+ᆸ
못	U+BABB	24-88	—	23-35	21-81	ᄆ+ᅩ+ᆺ
몽	U+BABD	24-89	—	23-36	21-82	ᄆ+ᅩ+ᆼ
몿	U+BABF	—	23-09	—	—	ᄆ+ᅩ+ᆾ
뫃	U+BAC3	—	23-10	23-37	—	ᄆ+ᅩ+ᇂ
뫄	U+BAC4	24-90	—	24-25	22-44	ᄆ+ᅪ+∅
뫅	U+BAC5	—	23-11	—	—	ᄆ+ᅪ+ᆨ
뫈	U+BAC8	24-91	—	24-26	42-08	ᄆ+ᅪ+ᆫ
뫋	U+BACB	—	23-12	—	—	ᄆ+ᅪ+ᆮ
뫌	U+BACC	—	23-13	—	—	ᄆ+ᅪ+ᆯ
뫔	U+BAD4	—	23-14	—	—	ᄆ+ᅪ+ᆷ
뫕	U+BAD5	—	23-15	—	—	ᄆ+ᅪ+ᆸ
뫗	U+BAD7	—	23-16	—	—	ᄆ+ᅪ+ᆺ
뫘	U+BAD8	24-92	—	24-28	—	ᄆ+ᅪ+ᆻ
뫙	U+BAD9	24-93	—	24-27	42-09	ᄆ+ᅪ+ᆼ
뫠	U+BAE0	—	23-17	24-36	42-12	ᄆ+ᅫ+∅
뫤	U+BAE4	—	23-18	—	—	ᄆ+ᅫ+ᆫ
뫨	U+BAE8	—	23-19	—	—	ᄆ+ᅫ+ᆯ
뫱	U+BAF1	—	23-20	—	—	ᄆ+ᅫ+ᆸ
뫴	U+BAF4	—	23-21	—	—	ᄆ+ᅫ+ᆻ
뫼	U+BAFC	24-94	—	24-12	22-40	ᄆ+ᅬ+∅
뫽	U+BAFD	—	23-22	—	—	ᄆ+ᅬ+ᆨ
묀	U+BB00	25-01	—	24-13	41-85	ᄆ+ᅬ+ᆫ
묃	U+BB03	—	23-23	—	41-86	ᄆ+ᅬ+ᆮ
묄	U+BB04	25-02	—	24-14	41-87	ᄆ+ᅬ+ᆯ
묌	U+BB0C	—	23-24	24-15	41-88	ᄆ+ᅬ+ᆷ
묍	U+BB0D	25-03	—	24-16	41-89	ᄆ+ᅬ+ᆸ
묏	U+BB0F	25-04	—	24-17	22-41	ᄆ+ᅬ+ᆺ
묑	U+BB11	25-05	—	24-18	41-90	ᄆ+ᅬ+ᆼ
묘	U+BB18	25-06	—	23-38	21-83	ᄆ+ᅭ+∅
묙	U+BB19	—	23-25	—	41-51	ᄆ+ᅭ+ᆨ
묜	U+BB1C	25-07	—	23-39	41-52	ᄆ+ᅭ+ᆫ
묟	U+BB1F	—	23-26	—	—	ᄆ+ᅭ+ᆮ
묠	U+BB20	25-08	—	23-40	41-53	ᄆ+ᅭ+ᆯ
묨	U+BB28	—	23-27	—	41-54	ᄆ+ᅭ+ᆷ
묩	U+BB29	25-09	—	23-41	41-55	ᄆ+ᅭ+ᆸ
묫	U+BB2B	25-10	—	23-42	41-56	ᄆ+ᅭ+ᆺ
묭	U+BB2D	—	23-28	—	41-57	ᄆ+ᅭ+ᆼ
무	U+BB34	25-11	—	23-43	21-84	ᄆ+ᅮ+∅
묵	U+BB35	25-12	—	23-44	21-85	ᄆ+ᅮ+ᆨ
묶	U+BB36	25-13	—	23-56	22-03	ᄆ+ᅮ+ᆩ
문	U+BB38	25-14	—	23-45	21-86	ᄆ+ᅮ+ᆫ
묺	U+BB3A	—	23-29	—	—	ᄆ+ᅮ+ᆭ
묻	U+BB3B	25-15	—	23-46	21-87	ᄆ+ᅮ+ᆮ
물	U+BB3C	25-16	—	23-47	21-88	ᄆ+ᅮ+ᆯ
묽	U+BB3D	25-17	—	23-48	21-89	ᄆ+ᅮ+ᆰ
묾	U+BB3E	25-18	—	23-49	21-90	ᄆ+ᅮ+ᆱ
뭀	U+BB40	—	23-30	—	41-58	ᄆ+ᅮ+ᆳ
뭄	U+BB44	25-19	—	23-50	21-91	ᄆ+ᅮ+ᆷ
뭅	U+BB45	25-20	—	23-51	21-92	ᄆ+ᅮ+ᆸ
뭇	U+BB47	25-21	—	23-52	21-93	ᄆ+ᅮ+ᆺ
뭉	U+BB49	25-22	—	23-53	21-94	ᄆ+ᅮ+ᆼ
뭋	U+BB4B	—	23-31	—	41-59	ᄆ+ᅮ+ᆾ
뭍	U+BB4D	25-23	—	23-54	22-01	ᄆ+ᅮ+ᇀ
뭏	U+BB4F	25-24	—	23-55	22-02	ᄆ+ᅮ+ᇂ
뭐	U+BB50	25-25	—	24-29	22-45	ᄆ+ᅯ+∅
뭑	U+BB51	—	23-32	—	—	ᄆ+ᅯ+ᆨ
뭔	U+BB54	25-26	—	24-30	22-46	ᄆ+ᅯ+ᆫ
뭗	U+BB57	—	23-33	—	42-10	ᄆ+ᅯ+ᆮ
뭘	U+BB58	25-27	—	24-31	22-47	ᄆ+ᅯ+ᆯ
뭠	U+BB60	—	23-34	24-32	42-11	ᄆ+ᅯ+ᆷ
뭡	U+BB61	25-28	—	24-33	22-48	ᄆ+ᅯ+ᆸ
뭣	U+BB63	25-29	—	24-34	22-49	ᄆ+ᅯ+ᆺ
뭤	U+BB64	—	23-35	24-35	—	ᄆ+ᅯ+ᆻ
뭥	U+BB65	—	23-36	—	—	ᄆ+ᅯ+ᆼ
뭬	U+BB6C	25-30	—	24-37	22-50	ᄆ+ᅰ+∅
뭭	U+BB6D	—	23-37	—	—	ᄆ+ᅰ+ᆨ
뭰	U+BB70	—	23-38	—	22-51	ᄆ+ᅰ+ᆫ
뭴	U+BB74	—	23-39	—	22-52	ᄆ+ᅰ+ᆯ
뭼	U+BB7C	—	23-40	—	42-13	ᄆ+ᅰ+ᆷ
뭽	U+BB7D	—	23-41	—	22-53	ᄆ+ᅰ+ᆸ
뭿	U+BB7F	—	23-42	—	42-14	ᄆ+ᅰ+ᆺ
뮀	U+BB80	—	23-43	—	—	ᄆ+ᅰ+ᆻ
뮁	U+BB81	—	23-44	—	—	ᄆ+ᅰ+ᆼ
뮈	U+BB88	25-31	—	24-19	22-42	ᄆ+ᅱ+∅
뮉	U+BB89	—	23-45	—	41-91	ᄆ+ᅱ+ᆨ
뮊	U+BB8A	—	23-46	—	—	ᄆ+ᅱ+ᆩ
뮌	U+BB8C	25-32	—	24-20	41-92	ᄆ+ᅱ+ᆫ
뮐	U+BB90	25-33	—	24-21	41-93	ᄆ+ᅱ+ᆯ
뮘	U+BB98	—	23-47	—	—	ᄆ+ᅱ+ᆷ
뮙	U+BB99	—	23-48	—	41-94	ᄆ+ᅱ+ᆸ
뮛	U+BB9B	—	23-49	—	—	ᄆ+ᅱ+ᆺ
뮜	U+BB9C	—	23-50	—	—	ᄆ+ᅱ+ᆻ
뮝	U+BB9D	—	23-51	—	—	ᄆ+ᅱ+ᆼ
뮤	U+BBA4	25-34	—	23-57	22-04	ᄆ+ᅲ+∅
뮥	U+BBA5	—	23-52	23-58	41-60	ᄆ+ᅲ+ᆨ
뮨	U+BBA8	25-35	—	23-59	22-05	ᄆ+ᅲ+ᆫ
뮫	U+BBAB	—	23-53	—	—	ᄆ+ᅲ+ᆮ
뮬	U+BBAC	25-36	—	23-60	22-06	ᄆ+ᅲ+ᆯ
뮴	U+BBB4	25-37	—	23-61	22-07	ᄆ+ᅲ+ᆷ
뮵	U+BBB5	—	23-54	—	41-61	ᄆ+ᅲ+ᆸ
뮷	U+BBB7	25-38	—	23-62	—	ᄆ+ᅲ+ᆺ
뮹	U+BBB9	—	23-55	23-63	41-62	ᄆ+ᅲ+ᆼ
므	U+BBC0	25-39	—	23-64	22-08	ᄆ+ᅳ+∅
믁	U+BBC1	—	23-56	—	41-63	ᄆ+ᅳ+ᆨ
믃	U+BBC3	—	—	—	41-64	ᄆ+ᅳ+ᆪ
믄	U+BBC4	25-40	—	23-65	41-65	ᄆ+ᅳ+ᆫ
믇	U+BBC7	—	23-57	—	41-66	ᄆ+ᅳ+ᆮ
믈	U+BBC8	25-41	—	23-66	41-67	ᄆ+ᅳ+ᆯ
믉	U+BBC9	—	23-58	—	—	ᄆ+ᅳ+ᆰ
믌	U+BBCC	—	23-59	—	41-68	ᄆ+ᅳ+ᆳ
믏	U+BBCF	—	23-60	—	—	ᄆ+ᅳ+ᆶ
믐	U+BBD0	25-42	—	23-67	22-09	ᄆ+ᅳ+ᆷ
믑	U+BBD1	—	23-61	23-68	41-69	ᄆ+ᅳ+ᆸ
믓	U+BBD3	25-43	—	23-69	41-70	ᄆ+ᅳ+ᆺ
믕	U+BBD5	—	23-62	23-70	41-71	ᄆ+ᅳ+ᆼ
믙	U+BBD9	—	23-63	—	—	ᄆ+ᅳ+ᇀ
믜	U+BBDC	—	23-64	24-22	22-43	ᄆ+ᅴ+∅
믝	U+BBDD	—	23-65	—	42-01	ᄆ+ᅴ+ᆨ
믠	U+BBE0	—	23-66	24-23	42-02	ᄆ+ᅴ+ᆫ
믤	U+BBE4	—	23-67	—	42-03	ᄆ+ᅴ+ᆯ
믬	U+BBEC	—	23-68	24-24	—	ᄆ+ᅴ+ᆷ
믭	U+BBED	—	23-69	—	42-04	ᄆ+ᅴ+ᆸ
믯	U+BBEF	—	23-70	—	42-05	ᄆ+ᅴ+ᆺ
믱	U+BBF1	—	23-71	—	42-06	ᄆ+ᅴ+ᆼ
믲	U+BBF2	—	23-72	—	42-07	ᄆ+ᅴ+ᆽ
미	U+BBF8	25-44	—	23-71	22-10	ᄆ+ᅵ+∅
믹	U+BBF9	25-45	—	23-72	22-11	ᄆ+ᅵ+ᆨ
민	U+BBFC	25-46	—	23-73	22-12	ᄆ+ᅵ+ᆫ
믿	U+BBFF	25-47	—	23-74	22-13	ᄆ+ᅵ+ᆮ
밀	U+BC00	25-48	—	23-75	22-14	ᄆ+ᅵ+ᆯ
밁	U+BC01	—	23-73	—	—	ᄆ+ᅵ+ᆰ
밂	U+BC02	25-49	—	23-76	22-15	ᄆ+ᅵ+ᆱ
밄	U+BC04	—	23-74	—	41-72	ᄆ+ᅵ+ᆳ
밈	U+BC08	25-50	—	23-77	22-16	ᄆ+ᅵ+ᆷ
밉	U+BC09	25-51	—	23-78	22-17	ᄆ+ᅵ+ᆸ
밋	U+BC0B	25-52	—	23-79	22-18	ᄆ+ᅵ+ᆺ
밌	U+BC0C	25-53	—	23-83	—	ᄆ+ᅵ+ᆻ
밍	U+BC0D	25-54	—	23-80	22-19	ᄆ+ᅵ+ᆼ
밎	U+BC0E	—	23-75	—	—	ᄆ+ᅵ+ᆽ
및	U+BC0F	25-55	—	23-81	22-20	ᄆ+ᅵ+ᆾ
밐	U+BC10	—	23-76	—	—	ᄆ+ᅵ+ᆿ
밑	U+BC11	25-56	—	23-82	22-21	ᄆ+ᅵ+ᇀ
바	U+BC14	25-57	—	24-38	22-56	ᄇ+ᅡ+∅
박	U+BC15	25-58	—	24-39	22-57	ᄇ+ᅡ+ᆨ
밖	U+BC16	25-59	—	24-52	22-69	ᄇ+ᅡ+ᆩ
밗	U+BC17	25-60	—	24-40	42-15	ᄇ+ᅡ+ᆪ
반	U+BC18	25-61	—	24-41	22-58	ᄇ+ᅡ+ᆫ
받	U+BC1B	25-62	—	24-42	22-59	ᄇ+ᅡ+ᆮ
발	U+BC1C	25-63	—	24-43	22-60	ᄇ+ᅡ+ᆯ
밝	U+BC1D	25-64	—	24-44	22-61	ᄇ+ᅡ+ᆰ
밞	U+BC1E	25-65	—	24-45	22-62	ᄇ+ᅡ+ᆱ
밟	U+BC1F	25-66	—	24-46	22-63	ᄇ+ᅡ+ᆲ
밠	U+BC20	—	23-77	—	42-16	ᄇ+ᅡ+ᆳ
밣	U+BC23	—	23-78	—	—	ᄇ+ᅡ+ᆶ
밤	U+BC24	25-67	—	24-47	22-64	ᄇ+ᅡ+ᆷ
밥	U+BC25	25-68	—	24-48	22-65	ᄇ+ᅡ+ᆸ
밧	U+BC27	25-69	—	24-49	22-66	ᄇ+ᅡ+ᆺ
밨	U+BC28	—	23-79	—	—	ᄇ+ᅡ+ᆻ
방	U+BC29	25-70	—	24-50	22-67	ᄇ+ᅡ+ᆼ
밫	U+BC2B	—	23-80	—	42-17	ᄇ+ᅡ+ᆾ
밬	U+BC2C	—	23-81	—	—	ᄇ+ᅡ+ᆿ
밭	U+BC2D	25-71	—	24-51	22-68	ᄇ+ᅡ+ᇀ
밯	U+BC2F	—	23-82	—	42-18	ᄇ+ᅡ+ᇂ
배	U+BC30	25-72	—	25-41	23-41	ᄇ+ᅢ+∅
백	U+BC31	25-73	—	25-42	23-42	ᄇ+ᅢ+ᆨ
밴	U+BC34	25-74	—	25-43	23-43	ᄇ+ᅢ+ᆫ
밷	U+BC37	—	23-83	25-44	42-52	ᄇ+ᅢ+ᆮ
밸	U+BC38	25-75	—	25-45	23-44	ᄇ+ᅢ+ᆯ
뱀	U+BC40	25-76	—	25-46	23-45	ᄇ+ᅢ+ᆷ
뱁	U+BC41	25-77	—	25-47	23-46	ᄇ+ᅢ+ᆸ
뱃	U+BC43	25-78	—	25-48	23-47	ᄇ+ᅢ+ᆺ
뱄	U+BC44	25-79	—	25-51	23-50	ᄇ+ᅢ+ᆻ
뱅	U+BC45	25-80	—	25-49	23-48	ᄇ+ᅢ+ᆼ
뱆	U+BC46	—	23-84	—	42-53	ᄇ+ᅢ+ᆽ
뱉	U+BC49	25-81	—	25-50	23-49	ᄇ+ᅢ+ᇀ
뱌	U+BC4C	25-82	—	24-53	22-70	ᄇ+ᅣ+∅
뱍	U+BC4D	25-83	—	24-54	22-71	ᄇ+ᅣ+ᆨ
뱐	U+BC50	25-84	—	24-55	22-72	ᄇ+ᅣ+ᆫ
뱔	U+BC54	—	23-85	—	42-19	ᄇ+ᅣ+ᆯ
뱜	U+BC5C	—	23-86	24-56	42-20	ᄇ+ᅣ+ᆷ
뱝	U+BC5D	25-85	—	24-57	22-73	ᄇ+ᅣ+ᆸ
뱟	U+BC5F	—	23-87	—	—	ᄇ+ᅣ+ᆺ
뱡	U+BC61	—	23-88	—	42-21	ᄇ+ᅣ+ᆼ
뱧	U+BC67	—	23-89	—	—	ᄇ+ᅣ+ᇂ
뱨	U+BC68	—	23-90	25-52	—	ᄇ+ᅤ+∅
뱰	U+BC70	—	23-91	—	—	ᄇ+ᅤ+ᆯ
뱷	U+BC77	—	23-92	—	—	ᄇ+ᅤ+ᆶ
뱽	U+BC7D	—	23-93	—	—	ᄇ+ᅤ+ᆼ
버	U+BC84	25-86	—	24-58	22-74	ᄇ+ᅥ+∅
벅	U+BC85	25-87	—	24-59	22-75	ᄇ+ᅥ+ᆨ
벆	U+BC86	—	23-94	—	—	ᄇ+ᅥ+ᆩ
번	U+BC88	25-88	—	24-60	22-76	ᄇ+ᅥ+ᆫ
벋	U+BC8B	25-89	—	24-61	22-77	ᄇ+ᅥ+ᆮ
벌	U+BC8C	25-90	—	24-62	22-78	ᄇ+ᅥ+ᆯ
벍	U+BC8D	—	24-01	24-63	—	ᄇ+ᅥ+ᆰ
벎	U+BC8E	25-91	—	24-64	22-79	ᄇ+ᅥ+ᆱ
벐	U+BC90	—	24-02	—	—	ᄇ+ᅥ+ᆳ
범	U+BC94	25-92	—	24-65	22-80	ᄇ+ᅥ+ᆷ
법	U+BC95	25-93	—	24-66	22-81	ᄇ+ᅥ+ᆸ
벗	U+BC97	25-94	—	24-67	22-82	ᄇ+ᅥ+ᆺ
벘	U+BC98	—	24-03	24-71	—	ᄇ+ᅥ+ᆻ
벙	U+BC99	26-01	—	24-68	22-83	ᄇ+ᅥ+ᆼ
벚	U+BC9A	26-02	—	24-69	42-22	ᄇ+ᅥ+ᆽ
벜	U+BC9C	—	24-04	24-70	42-23	ᄇ+ᅥ+ᆿ
벝	U+BC9D	—	24-05	—	—	ᄇ+ᅥ+ᇀ
베	U+BCA0	26-03	—	25-53	23-51	ᄇ+ᅦ+∅
벡	U+BCA1	26-04	—	25-54	23-52	ᄇ+ᅦ+ᆨ
벢	U+BCA2	—	24-06	—	—	ᄇ+ᅦ+ᆩ
벤	U+BCA4	26-05	—	25-55	23-53	ᄇ+ᅦ+ᆫ
벧	U+BCA7	26-06	—	25-56	42-54	ᄇ+ᅦ+ᆮ
벨	U+BCA8	26-07	—	25-57	23-54	ᄇ+ᅦ+ᆯ
벰	U+BCB0	26-08	—	25-58	23-55	ᄇ+ᅦ+ᆷ
벱	U+BCB1	26-09	—	25-59	23-56	ᄇ+ᅦ+ᆸ
벳	U+BCB3	26-10	—	25-60	42-55	ᄇ+ᅦ+ᆺ
벴	U+BCB4	26-11	—	25-62	23-58	ᄇ+ᅦ+ᆻ
벵	U+BCB5	26-12	—	25-61	23-57	ᄇ+ᅦ+ᆼ
벸	U+BCB8	—	24-07	—	42-56	ᄇ+ᅦ+ᆿ
벹	U+BCB9	—	24-08	—	42-57	ᄇ+ᅦ+ᇀ
벼	U+BCBC	26-13	—	24-72	22-84	ᄇ+ᅧ+∅
벽	U+BCBD	26-14	—	24-73	22-85	ᄇ+ᅧ+ᆨ
변	U+BCC0	26-15	—	24-74	22-86	ᄇ+ᅧ+ᆫ
볃	U+BCC3	—	24-09	—	42-24	ᄇ+ᅧ+ᆮ
별	U+BCC4	26-16	—	24-75	22-87	ᄇ+ᅧ+ᆯ
볈	U+BCC8	—	24-10	—	42-25	ᄇ+ᅧ+ᆳ
볌	U+BCCC	—	24-11	24-76	22-88	ᄇ+ᅧ+ᆷ
볍	U+BCCD	26-17	—	24-77	22-89	ᄇ+ᅧ+ᆸ
볏	U+BCCF	26-18	—	24-78	22-90	ᄇ+ᅧ+ᆺ
볐	U+BCD0	26-19	—	24-82	22-93	ᄇ+ᅧ+ᆻ
병	U+BCD1	26-20	—	24-79	22-91	ᄇ+ᅧ+ᆼ
볒	U+BCD2	—	24-12	—	—	ᄇ+ᅧ+ᆽ
볓	U+BCD3	—	24-13	24-80	42-26	ᄇ+ᅧ+ᆾ
볔	U+BCD4	—	24-14	—	42-27	ᄇ+ᅧ+ᆿ
볕	U+BCD5	26-21	—	24-81	22-92	ᄇ+ᅧ+ᇀ
볘	U+BCD8	26-22	—	25-63	23-59	ᄇ+ᅨ+∅
볙	U+BCD9	—	24-15	—	—	ᄇ+ᅨ+ᆨ
볜	U+BCDC	26-23	—	25-64	42-58	ᄇ+ᅨ+ᆫ
볠	U+BCE0	—	24-16	—	—	ᄇ+ᅨ+ᆯ
볨	U+BCE8	—	24-17	—	—	ᄇ+ᅨ+ᆷ
볩	U+BCE9	—	24-18	—	—	ᄇ+ᅨ+ᆸ
볫	U+BCEB	—	24-19	—	—	ᄇ+ᅨ+ᆺ
볭	U+BCED	—	24-20	—	42-59	ᄇ+ᅨ+ᆼ
보	U+BCF4	26-24	—	24-83	22-94	ᄇ+ᅩ+∅
복	U+BCF5	26-25	—	24-84	23-01	ᄇ+ᅩ+ᆨ
볶	U+BCF6	26-26	—	24-92	23-09	ᄇ+ᅩ+ᆩ
볷	U+BCF7	—	24-21	—	42-28	ᄇ+ᅩ+ᆪ
본	U+BCF8	26-27	—	24-85	23-02	ᄇ+ᅩ+ᆫ
볻	U+BCFB	—	24-22	—	42-29	ᄇ+ᅩ+ᆮ
볼	U+BCFC	26-28	—	24-86	23-03	ᄇ+ᅩ+ᆯ
볽	U+BCFD	—	24-23	—	—	ᄇ+ᅩ+ᆰ
볿	U+BCFF	—	24-24	—	42-30	ᄇ+ᅩ+ᆲ
봄	U+BD04	26-29	—	24-87	23-04	ᄇ+ᅩ+ᆷ
봅	U+BD05	26-30	—	24-88	23-05	ᄇ+ᅩ+ᆸ
봇	U+BD07	26-31	—	24-89	23-06	ᄇ+ᅩ+ᆺ
봉	U+BD09	26-32	—	24-90	23-07	ᄇ+ᅩ+ᆼ
봊	U+BD0A	—	24-25	—	42-31	ᄇ+ᅩ+ᆽ
봋	U+BD0B	—	24-26	—	42-32	ᄇ+ᅩ+ᆾ
봍	U+BD0D	—	24-27	—	—	ᄇ+ᅩ+ᇀ
봏	U+BD0F	—	24-28	24-91	23-08	ᄇ+ᅩ+ᇂ
봐	U+BD10	26-33	—	25-81	23-68	ᄇ+ᅪ+∅
봑	U+BD11	—	24-29	—	—	ᄇ+ᅪ+ᆨ
봔	U+BD14	26-34	—	25-82	42-73	ᄇ+ᅪ+ᆫ
봗	U+BD17	—	24-30	—	42-74	ᄇ+ᅪ+ᆮ
봘	U+BD18	—	24-31	—	—	ᄇ+ᅪ+ᆯ
봠	U+BD20	—	24-32	—	—	ᄇ+ᅪ+ᆷ
봡	U+BD21	—	24-33	25-83	—	ᄇ+ᅪ+ᆸ
봣	U+BD23	—	24-34	25-84	23-69	ᄇ+ᅪ+ᆺ
봤	U+BD24	26-35	—	25-85	23-70	ᄇ+ᅪ+ᆻ
봥	U+BD25	—	24-35	—	42-75	ᄇ+ᅪ+ᆼ
봬	U+BD2C	26-36	—	25-91	42-82	ᄇ+ᅫ+∅
봰	U+BD30	—	24-36	25-92	—	ᄇ+ᅫ+ᆫ
봳	U+BD33	—	24-37	—	42-83	ᄇ+ᅫ+ᆮ
봴	U+BD34	—	24-38	—	—	ᄇ+ᅫ+ᆯ
뵀	U+BD40	26-37	—	25-93	42-84	ᄇ+ᅫ+ᆻ
뵈	U+BD48	26-38	—	25-65	23-60	ᄇ+ᅬ+∅
뵉	U+BD49	26-39	—	25-66	—	ᄇ+ᅬ+ᆨ
뵊	U+BD4A	—	24-39	—	—	ᄇ+ᅬ+ᆩ
뵌	U+BD4C	26-40	—	25-67	23-61	ᄇ+ᅬ+ᆫ
뵏	U+BD4F	—	24-40	—	42-60	ᄇ+ᅬ+ᆮ
뵐	U+BD50	26-41	—	25-68	23-62	ᄇ+ᅬ+ᆯ
뵘	U+BD58	26-42	—	25-69	23-63	ᄇ+ᅬ+ᆷ
뵙	U+BD59	26-43	—	25-70	23-64	ᄇ+ᅬ+ᆸ
뵛	U+BD5B	—	24-41	—	42-61	ᄇ+ᅬ+ᆺ
뵜	U+BD5C	—	24-42	25-71	23-65	ᄇ+ᅬ+ᆻ
뵝	U+BD5D	—	24-43	—	—	ᄇ+ᅬ+ᆼ
뵤	U+BD64	26-44	—	24-93	23-10	ᄇ+ᅭ+∅
뵥	U+BD65	—	24-44	—	—	ᄇ+ᅭ+ᆨ
뵨	U+BD68	26-45	—	24-94	—	ᄇ+ᅭ+ᆫ
뵬	U+BD6C	—	24-45	25-01	42-33	ᄇ+ᅭ+ᆯ
뵴	U+BD74	—	24-46	—	42-34	ᄇ+ᅭ+ᆷ
뵵	U+BD75	—	24-47	—	—	ᄇ+ᅭ+ᆸ
뵷	U+BD77	—	24-48	—	—	ᄇ+ᅭ+ᆺ
뵹	U+BD79	—	24-49	—	42-35	ᄇ+ᅭ+ᆼ
부	U+BD80	26-46	—	25-02	23-11	ᄇ+ᅮ+∅
북	U+BD81	26-47	—	25-03	23-12	ᄇ+ᅮ+ᆨ
붂	U+BD82	—	24-50	—	—	ᄇ+ᅮ+ᆩ
분	U+BD84	26-48	—	25-04	23-13	ᄇ+ᅮ+ᆫ
붇	U+BD87	26-49	—	25-05	23-14	ᄇ+ᅮ+ᆮ
불	U+BD88	26-50	—	25-06	23-15	ᄇ+ᅮ+ᆯ
붉	U+BD89	26-51	—	25-07	23-16	ᄇ+ᅮ+ᆰ
붊	U+BD8A	26-52	—	25-08	23-17	ᄇ+ᅮ+ᆱ
붋	U+BD8B	—	24-51	—	42-36	ᄇ+ᅮ+ᆲ
붎	U+BD8E	—	24-52	—	—	ᄇ+ᅮ+ᆵ
붐	U+BD90	26-53	—	25-09	23-18	ᄇ+ᅮ+ᆷ
붑	U+BD91	26-54	—	25-10	23-19	ᄇ+ᅮ+ᆸ
붓	U+BD93	26-55	—	25-11	23-20	ᄇ+ᅮ+ᆺ
붕	U+BD95	26-56	—	25-12	23-21	ᄇ+ᅮ+ᆼ
붖	U+BD96	—	24-53	—	—	ᄇ+ᅮ+ᆽ
붗	U+BD97	—	24-54	—	42-37	ᄇ+ᅮ+ᆾ
붘	U+BD98	—	24-55	—	—	ᄇ+ᅮ+ᆿ
붙	U+BD99	26-57	—	25-13	23-22	ᄇ+ᅮ+ᇀ
붚	U+BD9A	26-58	—	25-14	23-23	ᄇ+ᅮ+ᇁ
붛	U+BD9B	—	24-56	—	—	ᄇ+ᅮ+ᇂ
붜	U+BD9C	26-59	—	25-86	23-71	ᄇ+ᅯ+∅
붝	U+BD9D	—	24-57	—	42-76	ᄇ+ᅯ+ᆨ
붠	U+BDA0	—	24-58	—	42-77	ᄇ+ᅯ+ᆫ
붣	U+BDA3	—	24-59	—	42-78	ᄇ+ᅯ+ᆮ
붤	U+BDA4	26-60	—	25-87	42-79	ᄇ+ᅯ+ᆯ
붬	U+BDAC	—	24-60	—	42-80	ᄇ+ᅯ+ᆷ
붭	U+BDAD	—	24-61	—	—	ᄇ+ᅯ+ᆸ
붯	U+BDAF	—	24-62	25-88	42-81	ᄇ+ᅯ+ᆺ
붰	U+BDB0	26-61	—	25-90	23-73	ᄇ+ᅯ+ᆻ
붱	U+BDB1	—	24-63	—	—	ᄇ+ᅯ+ᆼ
붴	U+BDB4	—	24-64	25-89	23-72	ᄇ+ᅯ+ᆿ
붸	U+BDB8	26-62	—	25-94	42-85	ᄇ+ᅰ+∅
붹	U+BDB9	—	24-65	—	—	ᄇ+ᅰ+ᆨ
붼	U+BDBC	—	24-66	—	42-86	ᄇ+ᅰ+ᆫ
붿	U+BDBF	—	24-67	—	42-87	ᄇ+ᅰ+ᆮ
뷀	U+BDC0	—	24-68	—	42-88	ᄇ+ᅰ+ᆯ
뷈	U+BDC8	—	24-69	—	42-89	ᄇ+ᅰ+ᆷ
뷉	U+BDC9	—	24-70	—	42-90	ᄇ+ᅰ+ᆸ
뷋	U+BDCB	—	24-71	—	—	ᄇ+ᅰ+ᆺ
뷌	U+BDCC	—	24-72	—	42-91	ᄇ+ᅰ+ᆻ
뷍	U+BDCD	—	24-73	—	—	ᄇ+ᅰ+ᆼ
뷔	U+BDD4	26-63	—	25-72	23-66	ᄇ+ᅱ+∅
뷕	U+BDD5	26-64	—	25-73	42-62	ᄇ+ᅱ+ᆨ
뷘	U+BDD8	26-65	—	25-74	42-63	ᄇ+ᅱ+ᆫ
뷛	U+BDDB	—	24-74	—	42-64	ᄇ+ᅱ+ᆮ
뷜	U+BDDC	26-66	—	25-75	42-65	ᄇ+ᅱ+ᆯ
뷤	U+BDE4	—	24-75	—	42-66	ᄇ+ᅱ+ᆷ
뷥	U+BDE5	—	24-76	—	—	ᄇ+ᅱ+ᆸ
뷧	U+BDE7	—	24-77	—	42-67	ᄇ+ᅱ+ᆺ
뷩	U+BDE9	26-67	—	25-76	42-68	ᄇ+ᅱ+ᆼ
뷰	U+BDF0	26-68	—	25-15	23-24	ᄇ+ᅲ+∅
뷱	U+BDF1	—	24-78	—	—	ᄇ+ᅲ+ᆨ
뷴	U+BDF4	26-69	—	25-16	42-38	ᄇ+ᅲ+ᆫ
뷷	U+BDF7	—	24-79	—	—	ᄇ+ᅲ+ᆮ
뷸	U+BDF8	26-70	—	25-17	23-25	ᄇ+ᅲ+ᆯ
븀	U+BE00	26-71	—	25-18	23-26	ᄇ+ᅲ+ᆷ
븁	U+BE01	—	24-80	25-19	—	ᄇ+ᅲ+ᆸ
븃	U+BE03	26-72	—	25-20	—	ᄇ+ᅲ+ᆺ
븅	U+BE05	26-73	—	25-21	—	ᄇ+ᅲ+ᆼ
브	U+BE0C	26-74	—	25-22	23-27	ᄇ+ᅳ+∅
븍	U+BE0D	26-75	—	25-23	42-39	ᄇ+ᅳ+ᆨ
븐	U+BE10	26-76	—	25-24	23-28	ᄇ+ᅳ+ᆫ
븓	U+BE13	—	24-81	—	42-40	ᄇ+ᅳ+ᆮ
블	U+BE14	26-77	—	25-25	23-29	ᄇ+ᅳ+ᆯ
븕	U+BE15	—	24-82	—	42-41	ᄇ+ᅳ+ᆰ
븗	U+BE17	—	24-83	—	42-42	ᄇ+ᅳ+ᆲ
븘	U+BE18	—	24-84	—	42-43	ᄇ+ᅳ+ᆳ
븛	U+BE1B	—	24-85	—	—	ᄇ+ᅳ+ᆶ
븜	U+BE1C	26-78	—	25-26	42-44	ᄇ+ᅳ+ᆷ
븝	U+BE1D	26-79	—	25-27	42-45	ᄇ+ᅳ+ᆸ
븟	U+BE1F	26-80	—	25-28	42-46	ᄇ+ᅳ+ᆺ
븡	U+BE21	—	24-86	25-29	—	ᄇ+ᅳ+ᆼ
븣	U+BE23	—	24-87	—	—	ᄇ+ᅳ+ᆾ
븥	U+BE25	—	24-88	—	42-47	ᄇ+ᅳ+ᇀ
븧	U+BE27	—	24-89	—	—	ᄇ+ᅳ+ᇂ
븨	U+BE28	—	24-90	25-77	23-67	ᄇ+ᅴ+∅
븩	U+BE29	—	24-91	—	42-69	ᄇ+ᅴ+ᆨ
븬	U+BE2C	—	24-92	25-78	42-70	ᄇ+ᅴ+ᆫ
븰	U+BE30	—	24-93	25-79	42-71	ᄇ+ᅴ+ᆯ
븸	U+BE38	—	24-94	—	—	ᄇ+ᅴ+ᆷ
븹	U+BE39	—	25-01	—	—	ᄇ+ᅴ+ᆸ
븻	U+BE3B	—	25-02	—	42-72	ᄇ+ᅴ+ᆺ
븽	U+BE3D	—	25-03	25-80	—	ᄇ+ᅴ+ᆼ
비	U+BE44	26-81	—	25-30	23-30	ᄇ+ᅵ+∅
빅	U+BE45	26-82	—	25-31	23-31	ᄇ+ᅵ+ᆨ
빈	U+BE48	26-83	—	25-32	23-32	ᄇ+ᅵ+ᆫ
빋	U+BE4B	—	25-04	—	42-48	ᄇ+ᅵ+ᆮ
빌	U+BE4C	26-84	—	25-33	23-33	ᄇ+ᅵ+ᆯ
빎	U+BE4E	26-85	—	25-34	23-34	ᄇ+ᅵ+ᆱ
빔	U+BE54	26-86	—	25-35	23-35	ᄇ+ᅵ+ᆷ
빕	U+BE55	26-87	—	25-36	23-36	ᄇ+ᅵ+ᆸ
빗	U+BE57	26-88	—	25-37	23-37	ᄇ+ᅵ+ᆺ
빘	U+BE58	—	25-05	—	42-51	ᄇ+ᅵ+ᆻ
빙	U+BE59	26-89	—	25-38	23-38	ᄇ+ᅵ+ᆼ
빚	U+BE5A	26-90	—	25-39	23-39	ᄇ+ᅵ+ᆽ
빛	U+BE5B	26-91	—	25-40	23-40	ᄇ+ᅵ+ᆾ
빜	U+BE5C	—	25-06	—	—	ᄇ+ᅵ+ᆿ
빝	U+BE5D	—	25-07	—	42-49	ᄇ+ᅵ+ᇀ
빟	U+BE5F	—	25-08	—	42-50	ᄇ+ᅵ+ᇂ
빠	U+BE60	26-92	—	38-74	33-33	ᄈ+ᅡ+∅
빡	U+BE61	26-93	—	38-75	33-34	ᄈ+ᅡ+ᆨ
빢	U+BE62	—	25-09	—	—	ᄈ+ᅡ+ᆩ
빤	U+BE64	26-94	—	38-76	33-35	ᄈ+ᅡ+ᆫ
빧	U+BE67	—	25-10	—	49-69	ᄈ+ᅡ+ᆮ
빨	U+BE68	27-01	—	38-77	33-36	ᄈ+ᅡ+ᆯ
빩	U+BE69	—	25-11	—	—	ᄈ+ᅡ+ᆰ
빪	U+BE6A	27-02	—	38-78	33-37	ᄈ+ᅡ+ᆱ
빰	U+BE70	27-03	—	38-79	49-70	ᄈ+ᅡ+ᆷ
빱	U+BE71	27-04	—	38-80	33-38	ᄈ+ᅡ+ᆸ
빳	U+BE73	27-05	—	38-81	33-39	ᄈ+ᅡ+ᆺ
빴	U+BE74	27-06	—	38-84	33-42	ᄈ+ᅡ+ᆻ
빵	U+BE75	27-07	—	38-82	33-40	ᄈ+ᅡ+ᆼ
빶	U+BE76	—	25-12	—	—	ᄈ+ᅡ+ᆽ
빹	U+BE79	—	25-13	—	49-71	ᄈ+ᅡ+ᇀ
빻	U+BE7B	27-08	—	38-83	33-41	ᄈ+ᅡ+ᇂ
빼	U+BE7C	27-09	—	39-44	33-87	ᄈ+ᅢ+∅
빽	U+BE7D	27-10	—	39-45	33-88	ᄈ+ᅢ+ᆨ
빾	U+BE7E	—	25-14	—	—	ᄈ+ᅢ+ᆩ
뺀	U+BE80	27-11	—	39-46	33-89	ᄈ+ᅢ+ᆫ
뺃	U+BE83	—	25-15	—	50-05	ᄈ+ᅢ+ᆮ
뺄	U+BE84	27-12	—	39-47	33-90	ᄈ+ᅢ+ᆯ
뺌	U+BE8C	27-13	—	39-48	33-91	ᄈ+ᅢ+ᆷ
뺍	U+BE8D	27-14	—	39-49	33-92	ᄈ+ᅢ+ᆸ
뺏	U+BE8F	27-15	—	39-50	33-93	ᄈ+ᅢ+ᆺ
뺐	U+BE90	27-16	—	39-52	34-01	ᄈ+ᅢ+ᆻ
뺑	U+BE91	27-17	—	39-51	33-94	ᄈ+ᅢ+ᆼ
뺘	U+BE98	27-18	—	38-85	33-43	ᄈ+ᅣ+∅
뺙	U+BE99	27-19	—	38-86	33-44	ᄈ+ᅣ+ᆨ
뺜	U+BE9C	—	25-16	38-87	33-45	ᄈ+ᅣ+ᆫ
뺨	U+BEA8	27-20	—	38-88	33-46	ᄈ+ᅣ+ᆷ
뺴	U+BEB4	—	25-17	39-53	—	ᄈ+ᅤ+∅
뺸	U+BEB8	—	25-18	—	—	ᄈ+ᅤ+ᆫ
뻐	U+BED0	27-21	—	38-89	33-47	ᄈ+ᅥ+∅
뻑	U+BED1	27-22	—	38-90	33-48	ᄈ+ᅥ+ᆨ
뻔	U+BED4	27-23	—	38-91	33-49	ᄈ+ᅥ+ᆫ
뻗	U+BED7	27-24	—	38-92	33-50	ᄈ+ᅥ+ᆮ
뻘	U+BED8	27-25	—	38-93	33-51	ᄈ+ᅥ+ᆯ
뻠	U+BEE0	27-26	—	38-94	49-72	ᄈ+ᅥ+ᆷ
뻡	U+BEE1	—	25-19	—	49-73	ᄈ+ᅥ+ᆸ
뻣	U+BEE3	27-27	—	39-01	33-52	ᄈ+ᅥ+ᆺ
뻤	U+BEE4	27-28	—	39-03	33-54	ᄈ+ᅥ+ᆻ
뻥	U+BEE5	27-29	—	39-02	33-53	ᄈ+ᅥ+ᆼ
뻦	U+BEE6	—	25-20	—	—	ᄈ+ᅥ+ᆽ
뻬	U+BEEC	27-30	—	39-54	34-02	ᄈ+ᅦ+∅
뻭	U+BEED	—	25-21	39-55	50-06	ᄈ+ᅦ+ᆨ
뻰	U+BEF0	—	25-22	39-56	34-03	ᄈ+ᅦ+ᆫ
뻳	U+BEF3	—	25-23	—	50-07	ᄈ+ᅦ+ᆮ
뻴	U+BEF4	—	25-24	39-57	50-08	ᄈ+ᅦ+ᆯ
뻼	U+BEFC	—	25-25	39-58	50-09	ᄈ+ᅦ+ᆷ
뻽	U+BEFD	—	25-26	—	50-10	ᄈ+ᅦ+ᆸ
뻿	U+BEFF	—	25-27	—	50-11	ᄈ+ᅦ+ᆺ
뼁	U+BF01	27-31	—	39-59	34-04	ᄈ+ᅦ+ᆼ
뼈	U+BF08	27-32	—	39-04	33-55	ᄈ+ᅧ+∅
뼉	U+BF09	27-33	—	39-05	33-56	ᄈ+ᅧ+ᆨ
뼌	U+BF0C	—	25-28	—	49-74	ᄈ+ᅧ+ᆫ
뼏	U+BF0F	—	25-29	—	49-75	ᄈ+ᅧ+ᆮ
뼐	U+BF10	—	25-30	—	49-76	ᄈ+ᅧ+ᆯ
뼘	U+BF18	27-34	—	39-06	33-57	ᄈ+ᅧ+ᆷ
뼙	U+BF19	27-35	—	39-07	49-77	ᄈ+ᅧ+ᆸ
뼛	U+BF1B	27-36	—	39-08	33-58	ᄈ+ᅧ+ᆺ
뼜	U+BF1C	27-37	—	39-10	49-81	ᄈ+ᅧ+ᆻ
뼝	U+BF1D	27-38	—	39-09	49-78	ᄈ+ᅧ+ᆼ
뼟	U+BF1F	—	25-31	—	49-79	ᄈ+ᅧ+ᆾ
뼡	U+BF21	—	25-32	—	49-80	ᄈ+ᅧ+ᇀ
뼤	U+BF24	—	25-33	—	—	ᄈ+ᅨ+∅
뼷	U+BF37	—	25-34	—	—	ᄈ+ᅨ+ᆺ
뼸	U+BF38	—	25-35	—	—	ᄈ+ᅨ+ᆻ
뼹	U+BF39	—	25-36	—	50-12	ᄈ+ᅨ+ᆼ
뽀	U+BF40	27-39	—	39-11	33-59	ᄈ+ᅩ+∅
뽁	U+BF41	27-40	—	39-12	49-82	ᄈ+ᅩ+ᆨ
뽄	U+BF44	27-41	—	39-13	33-60	ᄈ+ᅩ+ᆫ
뽇	U+BF47	—	25-37	—	—	ᄈ+ᅩ+ᆮ
뽈	U+BF48	27-42	—	39-14	33-61	ᄈ+ᅩ+ᆯ
뽐	U+BF50	27-43	—	39-15	33-62	ᄈ+ᅩ+ᆷ
뽑	U+BF51	27-44	—	39-16	33-63	ᄈ+ᅩ+ᆸ
뽓	U+BF53	—	25-38	39-17	—	ᄈ+ᅩ+ᆺ
뽕	U+BF55	27-45	—	39-18	33-64	ᄈ+ᅩ+ᆼ
뽙	U+BF59	—	—	—	49-83	ᄈ+ᅩ+ᇀ
뽛	U+BF5B	—	25-39	—	33-65	ᄈ+ᅩ+ᇂ
뽜	U+BF5C	—	25-40	39-63	50-16	ᄈ+ᅪ+∅
뽠	U+BF60	—	25-41	—	50-17	ᄈ+ᅪ+ᆫ
뽣	U+BF63	—	25-42	—	—	ᄈ+ᅪ+ᆮ
뽸	U+BF78	—	25-43	—	—	ᄈ+ᅫ+∅
뽿	U+BF7F	—	25-44	—	—	ᄈ+ᅫ+ᆮ
뾔	U+BF94	27-46	—	39-60	50-13	ᄈ+ᅬ+∅
뾤	U+BFA4	—	25-45	—	—	ᄈ+ᅬ+ᆷ
뾥	U+BFA5	—	25-46	—	—	ᄈ+ᅬ+ᆸ
뾬	U+BFAC	—	25-47	—	—	ᄈ+ᅬ+ᆿ
뾰	U+BFB0	27-47	—	39-19	33-66	ᄈ+ᅭ+∅
뿀	U+BFC0	—	25-48	—	49-84	ᄈ+ᅭ+ᆷ
뿁	U+BFC1	—	25-49	—	49-85	ᄈ+ᅭ+ᆸ
뿅	U+BFC5	27-48	—	39-20	33-67	ᄈ+ᅭ+ᆼ
뿌	U+BFCC	27-49	—	39-21	33-68	ᄈ+ᅮ+∅
뿍	U+BFCD	27-50	—	39-22	33-69	ᄈ+ᅮ+ᆨ
뿐	U+BFD0	27-51	—	39-23	33-70	ᄈ+ᅮ+ᆫ
뿓	U+BFD3	—	25-50	—	49-86	ᄈ+ᅮ+ᆮ
뿔	U+BFD4	27-52	—	39-24	33-71	ᄈ+ᅮ+ᆯ
뿕	U+BFD5	—	25-51	—	49-87	ᄈ+ᅮ+ᆰ
뿜	U+BFDC	27-53	—	39-25	33-72	ᄈ+ᅮ+ᆷ
뿝	U+BFDD	—	25-52	39-26	49-88	ᄈ+ᅮ+ᆸ
뿟	U+BFDF	27-54	—	39-27	49-89	ᄈ+ᅮ+ᆺ
뿡	U+BFE1	27-55	—	39-28	33-73	ᄈ+ᅮ+ᆼ
뿥	U+BFE5	—	—	—	49-90	ᄈ+ᅮ+ᇀ
뿨	U+BFE8	—	25-53	39-64	—	ᄈ+ᅯ+∅
뿯	U+BFEF	—	25-54	—	—	ᄈ+ᅯ+ᆮ
쀄	U+C004	—	25-55	—	50-18	ᄈ+ᅰ+∅
쀠	U+C020	—	25-56	39-61	50-14	ᄈ+ᅱ+∅
쀡	U+C021	—	25-57	—	—	ᄈ+ᅱ+ᆨ
쀼	U+C03C	27-56	—	39-29	33-74	ᄈ+ᅲ+∅
쁃	U+C043	—	25-58	—	—	ᄈ+ᅲ+ᆮ
쁄	U+C044	—	25-59	—	49-91	ᄈ+ᅲ+ᆯ
쁑	U+C051	27-57	—	39-30	—	ᄈ+ᅲ+ᆼ
쁘	U+C058	27-58	—	39-31	33-75	ᄈ+ᅳ+∅
쁙	U+C059	—	25-60	—	—	ᄈ+ᅳ+ᆨ
쁜	U+C05C	27-59	—	39-32	33-76	ᄈ+ᅳ+ᆫ
쁟	U+C05F	—	25-61	—	49-92	ᄈ+ᅳ+ᆮ
쁠	U+C060	27-60	—	39-33	33-77	ᄈ+ᅳ+ᆯ
쁨	U+C068	27-61	—	39-34	33-78	ᄈ+ᅳ+ᆷ
쁩	U+C069	27-62	—	39-35	33-79	ᄈ+ᅳ+ᆸ
쁫	U+C06B	—	25-62	—	49-93	ᄈ+ᅳ+ᆺ
쁴	U+C074	—	25-63	39-62	50-15	ᄈ+ᅴ+∅
삐	U+C090	27-63	—	39-36	33-80	ᄈ+ᅵ+∅
삑	U+C091	27-64	—	39-37	33-81	ᄈ+ᅵ+ᆨ
삔	U+C094	27-65	—	39-38	33-82	ᄈ+ᅵ+ᆫ
삗	U+C097	—	25-64	—	49-94	ᄈ+ᅵ+ᆮ
삘	U+C098	27-66	—	39-39	33-83	ᄈ+ᅵ+ᆯ
삠	U+C0A0	27-67	—	39-40	33-84	ᄈ+ᅵ+ᆷ
삡	U+C0A1	27-68	—	39-41	33-85	ᄈ+ᅵ+ᆸ
삣	U+C0A3	27-69	—	39-42	50-01	ᄈ+ᅵ+ᆺ
삤	U+C0A4	—	25-65	—	—	ᄈ+ᅵ+ᆻ
삥	U+C0A5	27-70	—	39-43	33-86	ᄈ+ᅵ+ᆼ
삦	U+C0A6	—	25-66	—	50-02	ᄈ+ᅵ+ᆽ
삧	U+C0A7	—	25-67	—	50-03	ᄈ+ᅵ+ᆾ
삫	U+C0AB	—	25-68	—	50-04	ᄈ+ᅵ+ᇂ
사	U+C0AC	27-71	—	26-01	23-75	ᄉ+ᅡ+∅
삭	U+C0AD	27-72	—	26-02	23-76	ᄉ+ᅡ+ᆨ
삮	U+C0AE	—	25-69	—	—	ᄉ+ᅡ+ᆩ
삯	U+C0AF	27-73	—	26-03	23-77	ᄉ+ᅡ+ᆪ
산	U+C0B0	27-74	—	26-04	23-78	ᄉ+ᅡ+ᆫ
삳	U+C0B3	27-75	—	26-05	42-92	ᄉ+ᅡ+ᆮ
살	U+C0B4	27-76	—	26-06	23-79	ᄉ+ᅡ+ᆯ
삵	U+C0B5	27-77	—	26-07	23-80	ᄉ+ᅡ+ᆰ
삶	U+C0B6	27-78	—	26-08	23-81	ᄉ+ᅡ+ᆱ
삷	U+C0B7	—	25-70	—	42-93	ᄉ+ᅡ+ᆲ
삸	U+C0B8	—	25-71	—	42-94	ᄉ+ᅡ+ᆳ
삺	U+C0BA	—	25-72	—	—	ᄉ+ᅡ+ᆵ
삻	U+C0BB	—	25-73	—	—	ᄉ+ᅡ+ᆶ
삼	U+C0BC	27-79	—	26-09	23-82	ᄉ+ᅡ+ᆷ
삽	U+C0BD	27-80	—	26-10	23-83	ᄉ+ᅡ+ᆸ
삿	U+C0BF	27-81	—	26-11	23-84	ᄉ+ᅡ+ᆺ
샀	U+C0C0	27-82	—	26-14	23-87	ᄉ+ᅡ+ᆻ
상	U+C0C1	27-83	—	26-12	23-85	ᄉ+ᅡ+ᆼ
샂	U+C0C2	—	25-74	—	43-01	ᄉ+ᅡ+ᆽ
샃	U+C0C3	—	25-75	—	—	ᄉ+ᅡ+ᆾ
샄	U+C0C4	—	25-76	—	43-02	ᄉ+ᅡ+ᆿ
샅	U+C0C5	27-84	—	26-13	23-86	ᄉ+ᅡ+ᇀ
샆	U+C0C6	—	25-77	—	—	ᄉ+ᅡ+ᇁ
샇	U+C0C7	—	25-78	—	43-03	ᄉ+ᅡ+ᇂ
새	U+C0C8	27-85	—	27-15	24-73	ᄉ+ᅢ+∅
색	U+C0C9	27-86	—	27-16	24-74	ᄉ+ᅢ+ᆨ
샋	U+C0CB	—	25-79	—	43-40	ᄉ+ᅢ+ᆪ
샌	U+C0CC	27-87	—	27-17	24-75	ᄉ+ᅢ+ᆫ
샏	U+C0CF	—	25-80	—	43-41	ᄉ+ᅢ+ᆮ
샐	U+C0D0	27-88	—	27-18	24-76	ᄉ+ᅢ+ᆯ
샘	U+C0D8	27-89	—	27-19	24-77	ᄉ+ᅢ+ᆷ
샙	U+C0D9	27-90	—	27-20	24-78	ᄉ+ᅢ+ᆸ
샛	U+C0DB	27-91	—	27-21	24-79	ᄉ+ᅢ+ᆺ
샜	U+C0DC	27-92	—	27-23	24-81	ᄉ+ᅢ+ᆻ
생	U+C0DD	27-93	—	27-22	24-80	ᄉ+ᅢ+ᆼ
샣	U+C0E3	—	25-81	—	—	ᄉ+ᅢ+ᇂ
샤	U+C0E4	27-94	—	26-15	23-88	ᄉ+ᅣ+∅
샥	U+C0E5	28-01	—	26-16	43-04	ᄉ+ᅣ+ᆨ
샨	U+C0E8	28-02	—	26-17	23-89	ᄉ+ᅣ+ᆫ
샫	U+C0EB	—	25-82	—	43-05	ᄉ+ᅣ+ᆮ
샬	U+C0EC	28-03	—	26-18	23-90	ᄉ+ᅣ+ᆯ
샴	U+C0F4	28-04	—	26-19	23-91	ᄉ+ᅣ+ᆷ
샵	U+C0F5	28-05	—	26-20	43-06	ᄉ+ᅣ+ᆸ
샷	U+C0F7	28-06	—	26-21	23-92	ᄉ+ᅣ+ᆺ
샸	U+C0F8	—	25-83	—	—	ᄉ+ᅣ+ᆻ
샹	U+C0F9	28-07	—	26-22	23-93	ᄉ+ᅣ+ᆼ
샻	U+C0FB	—	25-84	—	—	ᄉ+ᅣ+ᆾ
샾	U+C0FE	—	25-85	—	—	ᄉ+ᅣ+ᇁ
샿	U+C0FF	—	25-86	—	—	ᄉ+ᅣ+ᇂ
섀	U+C100	28-08	—	27-24	43-42	ᄉ+ᅤ+∅
섄	U+C104	28-09	—	27-25	—	ᄉ+ᅤ+ᆫ
섈	U+C108	28-10	—	27-26	—	ᄉ+ᅤ+ᆯ
섐	U+C110	28-11	—	27-27	43-43	ᄉ+ᅤ+ᆷ
섕	U+C115	28-12	—	27-28	43-44	ᄉ+ᅤ+ᆼ
서	U+C11C	28-13	—	26-23	23-94	ᄉ+ᅥ+∅
석	U+C11D	28-14	—	26-24	24-01	ᄉ+ᅥ+ᆨ
섞	U+C11E	28-15	—	26-36	24-13	ᄉ+ᅥ+ᆩ
섟	U+C11F	28-16	—	26-25	24-02	ᄉ+ᅥ+ᆪ
선	U+C120	28-17	—	26-26	24-03	ᄉ+ᅥ+ᆫ
섣	U+C123	28-18	—	26-27	24-04	ᄉ+ᅥ+ᆮ
설	U+C124	28-19	—	26-28	24-05	ᄉ+ᅥ+ᆯ
섥	U+C125	—	25-87	—	43-07	ᄉ+ᅥ+ᆰ
섦	U+C126	28-20	—	26-29	24-06	ᄉ+ᅥ+ᆱ
섧	U+C127	28-21	—	26-30	24-07	ᄉ+ᅥ+ᆲ
섨	U+C128	—	25-88	—	43-08	ᄉ+ᅥ+ᆳ
섪	U+C12A	—	25-89	—	—	ᄉ+ᅥ+ᆵ
섬	U+C12C	28-22	—	26-31	24-08	ᄉ+ᅥ+ᆷ
섭	U+C12D	28-23	—	26-32	24-09	ᄉ+ᅥ+ᆸ
섯	U+C12F	28-24	—	26-33	24-10	ᄉ+ᅥ+ᆺ
섰	U+C130	28-25	—	26-37	24-14	ᄉ+ᅥ+ᆻ
성	U+C131	28-26	—	26-34	24-11	ᄉ+ᅥ+ᆼ
섴	U+C134	—	25-90	—	—	ᄉ+ᅥ+ᆿ
섶	U+C136	28-27	—	26-35	24-12	ᄉ+ᅥ+ᇁ
세	U+C138	28-28	—	27-29	24-82	ᄉ+ᅦ+∅
섹	U+C139	28-29	—	27-30	24-83	ᄉ+ᅦ+ᆨ
센	U+C13C	28-30	—	27-31	24-84	ᄉ+ᅦ+ᆫ
섿	U+C13F	—	25-91	—	43-45	ᄉ+ᅦ+ᆮ
셀	U+C140	28-31	—	27-32	24-85	ᄉ+ᅦ+ᆯ
셈	U+C148	28-32	—	27-33	24-86	ᄉ+ᅦ+ᆷ
셉	U+C149	28-33	—	27-34	24-87	ᄉ+ᅦ+ᆸ
셋	U+C14B	28-34	—	27-35	24-88	ᄉ+ᅦ+ᆺ
셌	U+C14C	28-35	—	27-39	24-90	ᄉ+ᅦ+ᆻ
셍	U+C14D	28-36	—	27-36	24-89	ᄉ+ᅦ+ᆼ
셎	U+C14E	—	25-92	—	43-46	ᄉ+ᅦ+ᆽ
셑	U+C151	—	25-93	27-37	—	ᄉ+ᅦ+ᇀ
셒	U+C152	—	25-94	27-38	—	ᄉ+ᅦ+ᇁ
셔	U+C154	28-37	—	26-38	24-15	ᄉ+ᅧ+∅
셕	U+C155	28-38	—	26-39	43-09	ᄉ+ᅧ+ᆨ
셗	U+C157	—	26-01	—	43-10	ᄉ+ᅧ+ᆪ
션	U+C158	28-39	—	26-40	24-16	ᄉ+ᅧ+ᆫ
셛	U+C15B	—	26-02	—	43-11	ᄉ+ᅧ+ᆮ
셜	U+C15C	28-40	—	26-41	43-12	ᄉ+ᅧ+ᆯ
셟	U+C15F	—	26-03	—	43-13	ᄉ+ᅧ+ᆲ
셠	U+C160	—	26-04	—	—	ᄉ+ᅧ+ᆳ
셤	U+C164	28-41	—	26-42	43-14	ᄉ+ᅧ+ᆷ
셥	U+C165	28-42	—	26-43	43-15	ᄉ+ᅧ+ᆸ
셧	U+C167	28-43	—	26-44	43-16	ᄉ+ᅧ+ᆺ
셨	U+C168	28-44	—	26-46	24-17	ᄉ+ᅧ+ᆻ
셩	U+C169	28-45	—	26-45	43-17	ᄉ+ᅧ+ᆼ
셰	U+C170	28-46	—	27-40	43-47	ᄉ+ᅨ+∅
셱	U+C171	—	26-05	—	—	ᄉ+ᅨ+ᆨ
셳	U+C173	—	26-06	—	—	ᄉ+ᅨ+ᆪ
셴	U+C174	28-47	—	27-41	43-48	ᄉ+ᅨ+ᆫ
셸	U+C178	28-48	—	27-42	43-49	ᄉ+ᅨ+ᆯ
솀	U+C180	—	26-07	—	43-50	ᄉ+ᅨ+ᆷ
솁	U+C181	—	26-08	—	—	ᄉ+ᅨ+ᆸ
솃	U+C183	—	26-09	—	43-51	ᄉ+ᅨ+ᆺ
솄	U+C184	—	26-10	—	—	ᄉ+ᅨ+ᆻ
솅	U+C185	28-49	—	27-43	43-52	ᄉ+ᅨ+ᆼ
소	U+C18C	28-50	—	26-47	24-18	ᄉ+ᅩ+∅
속	U+C18D	28-51	—	26-48	24-19	ᄉ+ᅩ+ᆨ
솎	U+C18E	28-52	—	26-58	24-28	ᄉ+ᅩ+ᆩ
손	U+C190	28-53	—	26-49	24-20	ᄉ+ᅩ+ᆫ
솓	U+C193	—	26-11	26-50	43-18	ᄉ+ᅩ+ᆮ
솔	U+C194	28-54	—	26-51	24-21	ᄉ+ᅩ+ᆯ
솕	U+C195	—	26-12	—	43-19	ᄉ+ᅩ+ᆰ
솖	U+C196	28-55	—	26-52	24-22	ᄉ+ᅩ+ᆱ
솗	U+C197	—	26-13	—	43-20	ᄉ+ᅩ+ᆲ
솘	U+C198	—	26-14	—	43-21	ᄉ+ᅩ+ᆳ
솜	U+C19C	28-56	—	26-53	24-23	ᄉ+ᅩ+ᆷ
솝	U+C19D	28-57	—	26-54	24-24	ᄉ+ᅩ+ᆸ
솟	U+C19F	28-58	—	26-55	24-25	ᄉ+ᅩ+ᆺ
송	U+C1A1	28-59	—	26-56	24-26	ᄉ+ᅩ+ᆼ
솣	U+C1A3	—	26-15	—	—	ᄉ+ᅩ+ᆾ
솥	U+C1A5	28-60	—	26-57	24-27	ᄉ+ᅩ+ᇀ
솦	U+C1A6	—	26-16	—	—	ᄉ+ᅩ+ᇁ
솨	U+C1A8	28-61	—	27-63	25-11	ᄉ+ᅪ+∅
솩	U+C1A9	28-62	—	27-64	43-63	ᄉ+ᅪ+ᆨ
솬	U+C1AC	28-63	—	27-65	43-64	ᄉ+ᅪ+ᆫ
솰	U+C1B0	28-64	—	27-66	25-12	ᄉ+ᅪ+ᆯ
솸	U+C1B8	—	26-17	—	—	ᄉ+ᅪ+ᆷ
솹	U+C1B9	—	26-18	—	—	ᄉ+ᅪ+ᆸ
솻	U+C1BB	—	26-19	27-67	—	ᄉ+ᅪ+ᆺ
솼	U+C1BC	—	26-20	—	—	ᄉ+ᅪ+ᆻ
솽	U+C1BD	28-65	—	27-68	43-65	ᄉ+ᅪ+ᆼ
쇄	U+C1C4	28-66	—	27-71	25-15	ᄉ+ᅫ+∅
쇅	U+C1C5	—	26-21	—	43-68	ᄉ+ᅫ+ᆨ
쇈	U+C1C8	28-67	—	27-72	—	ᄉ+ᅫ+ᆫ
쇋	U+C1CB	—	26-22	—	43-69	ᄉ+ᅫ+ᆮ
쇌	U+C1CC	28-68	—	27-73	—	ᄉ+ᅫ+ᆯ
쇔	U+C1D4	28-69	—	27-74	—	ᄉ+ᅫ+ᆷ
쇕	U+C1D5	—	26-23	—	—	ᄉ+ᅫ+ᆸ
쇗	U+C1D7	28-70	—	27-75	43-70	ᄉ+ᅫ+ᆺ
쇘	U+C1D8	28-71	—	27-76	25-16	ᄉ+ᅫ+ᆻ
쇙	U+C1D9	—	26-24	—	43-71	ᄉ+ᅫ+ᆼ
쇠	U+C1E0	28-72	—	27-44	24-91	ᄉ+ᅬ+∅
쇡	U+C1E1	—	26-25	27-45	43-53	ᄉ+ᅬ+ᆨ
쇤	U+C1E4	28-73	—	27-46	24-92	ᄉ+ᅬ+ᆫ
쇧	U+C1E7	—	26-26	—	43-54	ᄉ+ᅬ+ᆮ
쇨	U+C1E8	28-74	—	27-47	24-93	ᄉ+ᅬ+ᆯ
쇰	U+C1F0	28-75	—	27-48	24-94	ᄉ+ᅬ+ᆷ
쇱	U+C1F1	28-76	—	27-49	25-01	ᄉ+ᅬ+ᆸ
쇳	U+C1F3	28-77	—	27-50	25-02	ᄉ+ᅬ+ᆺ
쇴	U+C1F4	—	26-27	27-52	25-03	ᄉ+ᅬ+ᆻ
쇵	U+C1F5	—	26-28	27-51	43-55	ᄉ+ᅬ+ᆼ
쇼	U+C1FC	28-78	—	26-59	24-29	ᄉ+ᅭ+∅
쇽	U+C1FD	28-79	—	26-60	24-30	ᄉ+ᅭ+ᆨ
숀	U+C200	28-80	—	26-61	24-31	ᄉ+ᅭ+ᆫ
숃	U+C203	—	26-29	—	43-22	ᄉ+ᅭ+ᆮ
숄	U+C204	28-81	—	26-62	24-32	ᄉ+ᅭ+ᆯ
숌	U+C20C	28-82	—	26-63	43-23	ᄉ+ᅭ+ᆷ
숍	U+C20D	28-83	—	26-64	24-33	ᄉ+ᅭ+ᆸ
숏	U+C20F	28-84	—	26-65	43-24	ᄉ+ᅭ+ᆺ
숑	U+C211	28-85	—	26-66	43-25	ᄉ+ᅭ+ᆼ
숖	U+C216	—	26-30	—	—	ᄉ+ᅭ+ᇁ
수	U+C218	28-86	—	26-67	24-34	ᄉ+ᅮ+∅
숙	U+C219	28-87	—	26-68	24-35	ᄉ+ᅮ+ᆨ
순	U+C21C	28-88	—	26-69	24-36	ᄉ+ᅮ+ᆫ
숟	U+C21F	28-89	—	26-70	24-37	ᄉ+ᅮ+ᆮ
술	U+C220	28-90	—	26-71	24-38	ᄉ+ᅮ+ᆯ
숡	U+C221	—	26-31	—	—	ᄉ+ᅮ+ᆰ
숤	U+C224	—	26-32	—	43-26	ᄉ+ᅮ+ᆳ
숧	U+C227	—	26-33	—	—	ᄉ+ᅮ+ᆶ
숨	U+C228	28-91	—	26-72	24-39	ᄉ+ᅮ+ᆷ
숩	U+C229	28-92	—	26-73	24-40	ᄉ+ᅮ+ᆸ
숫	U+C22B	28-93	—	26-74	24-41	ᄉ+ᅮ+ᆺ
숭	U+C22D	28-94	—	26-75	24-42	ᄉ+ᅮ+ᆼ
숮	U+C22E	—	26-34	—	—	ᄉ+ᅮ+ᆽ
숯	U+C22F	29-01	—	26-76	24-43	ᄉ+ᅮ+ᆾ
숱	U+C231	29-02	—	26-77	24-44	ᄉ+ᅮ+ᇀ
숲	U+C232	29-03	—	26-78	24-45	ᄉ+ᅮ+ᇁ
숳	U+C233	—	26-35	—	—	ᄉ+ᅮ+ᇂ
숴	U+C234	29-04	—	27-69	25-13	ᄉ+ᅯ+∅
숵	U+C235	—	26-36	—	—	ᄉ+ᅯ+ᆨ
숸	U+C238	—	26-37	—	43-66	ᄉ+ᅯ+ᆫ
숻	U+C23B	—	26-38	—	43-67	ᄉ+ᅯ+ᆮ
숼	U+C23C	—	26-39	—	—	ᄉ+ᅯ+ᆯ
쉄	U+C244	—	26-40	—	—	ᄉ+ᅯ+ᆷ
쉅	U+C245	—	26-41	—	—	ᄉ+ᅯ+ᆸ
쉇	U+C247	—	26-42	—	—	ᄉ+ᅯ+ᆺ
쉈	U+C248	29-05	—	27-70	25-14	ᄉ+ᅯ+ᆻ
쉉	U+C249	—	26-43	—	—	ᄉ+ᅯ+ᆼ
쉐	U+C250	29-06	—	27-77	25-17	ᄉ+ᅰ+∅
쉑	U+C251	29-07	—	27-78	25-18	ᄉ+ᅰ+ᆨ
쉔	U+C254	29-08	—	27-79	43-72	ᄉ+ᅰ+ᆫ
쉗	U+C257	—	26-44	—	43-73	ᄉ+ᅰ+ᆮ
쉘	U+C258	29-09	—	27-80	25-19	ᄉ+ᅰ+ᆯ
쉠	U+C260	29-10	—	27-81	43-74	ᄉ+ᅰ+ᆷ
쉡	U+C261	—	26-45	27-82	43-75	ᄉ+ᅰ+ᆸ
쉣	U+C263	—	26-46	—	43-76	ᄉ+ᅰ+ᆺ
쉤	U+C264	—	26-47	—	43-78	ᄉ+ᅰ+ᆻ
쉥	U+C265	29-11	—	27-83	43-77	ᄉ+ᅰ+ᆼ
쉬	U+C26C	29-12	—	27-53	25-04	ᄉ+ᅱ+∅
쉭	U+C26D	29-13	—	27-54	43-56	ᄉ+ᅱ+ᆨ
쉰	U+C270	29-14	—	27-55	25-05	ᄉ+ᅱ+ᆫ
쉳	U+C273	—	26-48	—	43-57	ᄉ+ᅱ+ᆮ
쉴	U+C274	29-15	—	27-56	25-06	ᄉ+ᅱ+ᆯ
쉼	U+C27C	29-16	—	27-57	25-07	ᄉ+ᅱ+ᆷ
쉽	U+C27D	29-17	—	27-58	25-08	ᄉ+ᅱ+ᆸ
쉿	U+C27F	29-18	—	27-59	25-09	ᄉ+ᅱ+ᆺ
슁	U+C281	29-19	—	27-60	43-58	ᄉ+ᅱ+ᆼ
슆	U+C286	—	26-49	—	—	ᄉ+ᅱ+ᇁ
슈	U+C288	29-20	—	26-79	24-46	ᄉ+ᅲ+∅
슉	U+C289	29-21	—	26-80	24-47	ᄉ+ᅲ+ᆨ
슌	U+C28C	—	26-50	26-81	24-48	ᄉ+ᅲ+ᆫ
슏	U+C28F	—	26-51	—	43-27	ᄉ+ᅲ+ᆮ
슐	U+C290	29-22	—	26-82	24-49	ᄉ+ᅲ+ᆯ
슘	U+C298	29-23	—	26-83	24-50	ᄉ+ᅲ+ᆷ
슙	U+C299	—	26-52	26-84	—	ᄉ+ᅲ+ᆸ
슛	U+C29B	29-24	—	26-85	24-51	ᄉ+ᅲ+ᆺ
슝	U+C29D	29-25	—	26-86	43-28	ᄉ+ᅲ+ᆼ
스	U+C2A4	29-26	—	26-87	24-52	ᄉ+ᅳ+∅
슥	U+C2A5	29-27	—	26-88	24-53	ᄉ+ᅳ+ᆨ
슨	U+C2A8	29-28	—	26-89	24-54	ᄉ+ᅳ+ᆫ
슫	U+C2AB	—	26-53	—	43-29	ᄉ+ᅳ+ᆮ
슬	U+C2AC	29-29	—	26-90	24-55	ᄉ+ᅳ+ᆯ
슭	U+C2AD	29-30	—	26-91	24-56	ᄉ+ᅳ+ᆰ
슮	U+C2AE	—	26-54	—	—	ᄉ+ᅳ+ᆱ
슯	U+C2AF	—	26-55	—	43-30	ᄉ+ᅳ+ᆲ
슰	U+C2B0	—	26-56	—	43-31	ᄉ+ᅳ+ᆳ
슲	U+C2B2	—	26-57	26-92	43-32	ᄉ+ᅳ+ᆵ
슳	U+C2B3	—	26-58	26-93	43-33	ᄉ+ᅳ+ᆶ
슴	U+C2B4	29-31	—	26-94	24-57	ᄉ+ᅳ+ᆷ
습	U+C2B5	29-32	—	27-01	24-58	ᄉ+ᅳ+ᆸ
슷	U+C2B7	29-33	—	27-02	24-59	ᄉ+ᅳ+ᆺ
승	U+C2B9	29-34	—	27-03	24-60	ᄉ+ᅳ+ᆼ
슺	U+C2BA	—	26-59	—	43-34	ᄉ+ᅳ+ᆽ
슻	U+C2BB	—	26-60	—	43-35	ᄉ+ᅳ+ᆾ
슾	U+C2BE	—	26-61	—	43-36	ᄉ+ᅳ+ᇁ
싀	U+C2C0	—	26-62	27-61	25-10	ᄉ+ᅴ+∅
싁	U+C2C1	—	26-63	—	43-59	ᄉ+ᅴ+ᆨ
싄	U+C2C4	—	26-64	27-62	43-60	ᄉ+ᅴ+ᆫ
싈	U+C2C8	—	26-65	—	43-61	ᄉ+ᅴ+ᆯ
싐	U+C2D0	—	26-66	—	—	ᄉ+ᅴ+ᆷ
싑	U+C2D1	—	26-67	—	—	ᄉ+ᅴ+ᆸ
싓	U+C2D3	—	26-68	—	43-62	ᄉ+ᅴ+ᆺ
싕	U+C2D5	—	26-69	—	—	ᄉ+ᅴ+ᆼ
시	U+C2DC	29-35	—	27-04	24-61	ᄉ+ᅵ+∅
식	U+C2DD	29-36	—	27-05	24-62	ᄉ+ᅵ+ᆨ
싞	U+C2DE	—	26-70	—	43-39	ᄉ+ᅵ+ᆩ
신	U+C2E0	29-37	—	27-06	24-63	ᄉ+ᅵ+ᆫ
싢	U+C2E2	—	26-71	—	—	ᄉ+ᅵ+ᆭ
싣	U+C2E3	29-38	—	27-07	24-64	ᄉ+ᅵ+ᆮ
실	U+C2E4	29-39	—	27-08	24-65	ᄉ+ᅵ+ᆯ
싥	U+C2E5	—	26-72	—	43-37	ᄉ+ᅵ+ᆰ
싦	U+C2E6	—	26-73	—	—	ᄉ+ᅵ+ᆱ
싨	U+C2E8	—	26-74	—	43-38	ᄉ+ᅵ+ᆳ
싫	U+C2EB	29-40	—	27-09	24-66	ᄉ+ᅵ+ᆶ
심	U+C2EC	29-41	—	27-10	24-67	ᄉ+ᅵ+ᆷ
십	U+C2ED	29-42	—	27-11	24-68	ᄉ+ᅵ+ᆸ
싯	U+C2EF	29-43	—	27-12	24-69	ᄉ+ᅵ+ᆺ
싰	U+C2F0	—	26-75	—	—	ᄉ+ᅵ+ᆻ
싱	U+C2F1	29-44	—	27-13	24-70	ᄉ+ᅵ+ᆼ
싳	U+C2F3	—	26-76	—	24-71	ᄉ+ᅵ+ᆾ
싴	U+C2F4	—	26-77	—	—	ᄉ+ᅵ+ᆿ
싶	U+C2F6	29-45	—	27-14	24-72	ᄉ+ᅵ+ᇁ
싸	U+C2F8	29-46	—	39-65	34-06	ᄊ+ᅡ+∅
싹	U+C2F9	29-47	—	39-66	34-07	ᄊ+ᅡ+ᆨ
싻	U+C2FB	29-48	—	39-67	50-19	ᄊ+ᅡ+ᆪ
싼	U+C2FC	29-49	—	39-68	34-08	ᄊ+ᅡ+ᆫ
싿	U+C2FF	—	26-78	—	50-20	ᄊ+ᅡ+ᆮ
쌀	U+C300	29-50	—	39-69	34-09	ᄊ+ᅡ+ᆯ
쌁	U+C301	—	26-79	—	—	ᄊ+ᅡ+ᆰ
쌂	U+C302	—	26-80	—	50-21	ᄊ+ᅡ+ᆱ
쌈	U+C308	29-51	—	39-70	34-10	ᄊ+ᅡ+ᆷ
쌉	U+C309	29-52	—	39-71	34-11	ᄊ+ᅡ+ᆸ
쌋	U+C30B	—	26-81	39-72	50-22	ᄊ+ᅡ+ᆺ
쌌	U+C30C	29-53	—	39-75	34-14	ᄊ+ᅡ+ᆻ
쌍	U+C30D	29-54	—	39-73	34-12	ᄊ+ᅡ+ᆼ
쌎	U+C30E	—	26-82	—	—	ᄊ+ᅡ+ᆽ
쌑	U+C311	—	26-83	—	50-23	ᄊ+ᅡ+ᇀ
쌓	U+C313	29-55	—	39-74	34-13	ᄊ+ᅡ+ᇂ
쌔	U+C314	29-56	—	40-43	34-62	ᄊ+ᅢ+∅
쌕	U+C315	29-57	—	40-44	34-63	ᄊ+ᅢ+ᆨ
쌘	U+C318	29-58	—	40-45	34-64	ᄊ+ᅢ+ᆫ
쌛	U+C31B	—	26-84	—	50-52	ᄊ+ᅢ+ᆮ
쌜	U+C31C	29-59	—	40-46	34-65	ᄊ+ᅢ+ᆯ
쌤	U+C324	29-60	—	40-47	34-66	ᄊ+ᅢ+ᆷ
쌥	U+C325	29-61	—	40-48	34-67	ᄊ+ᅢ+ᆸ
쌧	U+C327	—	26-85	40-49	50-53	ᄊ+ᅢ+ᆺ
쌨	U+C328	29-62	—	40-51	50-54	ᄊ+ᅢ+ᆻ
쌩	U+C329	29-63	—	40-50	34-68	ᄊ+ᅢ+ᆼ
쌯	U+C32F	—	26-86	—	—	ᄊ+ᅢ+ᇂ
쌰	U+C330	—	26-87	39-76	34-15	ᄊ+ᅣ+∅
쌱	U+C331	—	26-88	—	50-24	ᄊ+ᅣ+ᆨ
쌴	U+C334	—	26-89	39-77	50-25	ᄊ+ᅣ+ᆫ
쌷	U+C337	—	26-90	—	—	ᄊ+ᅣ+ᆮ
쌸	U+C338	—	26-91	39-78	—	ᄊ+ᅣ+ᆯ
썀	U+C340	—	26-92	—	50-26	ᄊ+ᅣ+ᆷ
썁	U+C341	—	26-93	—	—	ᄊ+ᅣ+ᆸ
썃	U+C343	—	26-94	—	—	ᄊ+ᅣ+ᆺ
썅	U+C345	29-64	—	39-79	50-27	ᄊ+ᅣ+ᆼ
썌	U+C34C	—	27-01	40-52	—	ᄊ+ᅤ+∅
썐	U+C350	—	27-02	—	—	ᄊ+ᅤ+ᆫ
썔	U+C354	—	27-03	—	—	ᄊ+ᅤ+ᆯ
썜	U+C35C	—	27-04	—	—	ᄊ+ᅤ+ᆷ
썡	U+C361	—	27-05	—	—	ᄊ+ᅤ+ᆼ
써	U+C368	29-65	—	39-80	34-16	ᄊ+ᅥ+∅
썩	U+C369	29-66	—	39-81	34-17	ᄊ+ᅥ+ᆨ
썪	U+C36A	—	27-06	39-89	50-30	ᄊ+ᅥ+ᆩ
썬	U+C36C	29-67	—	39-82	34-18	ᄊ+ᅥ+ᆫ
썯	U+C36F	—	27-07	—	50-28	ᄊ+ᅥ+ᆮ
썰	U+C370	29-68	—	39-83	34-19	ᄊ+ᅥ+ᆯ
썲	U+C372	29-69	—	39-84	34-20	ᄊ+ᅥ+ᆱ
썸	U+C378	29-70	—	39-85	34-21	ᄊ+ᅥ+ᆷ
썹	U+C379	29-71	—	39-86	34-22	ᄊ+ᅥ+ᆸ
썻	U+C37B	—	27-08	39-87	34-23	ᄊ+ᅥ+ᆺ
썼	U+C37C	29-72	—	39-90	34-25	ᄊ+ᅥ+ᆻ
썽	U+C37D	29-73	—	39-88	34-24	ᄊ+ᅥ+ᆼ
쎂	U+C382	—	27-09	—	50-29	ᄊ+ᅥ+ᇁ
쎄	U+C384	29-74	—	40-53	34-69	ᄊ+ᅦ+∅
쎅	U+C385	—	27-10	40-54	34-70	ᄊ+ᅦ+ᆨ
쎈	U+C388	29-75	—	40-55	34-71	ᄊ+ᅦ+ᆫ
쎋	U+C38B	—	27-11	—	50-55	ᄊ+ᅦ+ᆮ
쎌	U+C38C	29-76	—	40-56	34-72	ᄊ+ᅦ+ᆯ
쎔	U+C394	—	27-12	40-57	50-56	ᄊ+ᅦ+ᆷ
쎕	U+C395	—	27-13	40-58	50-57	ᄊ+ᅦ+ᆸ
쎗	U+C397	—	27-14	—	50-58	ᄊ+ᅦ+ᆺ
쎘	U+C398	—	27-15	—	50-59	ᄊ+ᅦ+ᆻ
쎙	U+C399	—	27-16	40-59	—	ᄊ+ᅦ+ᆼ
쎝	U+C39D	—	27-17	—	—	ᄊ+ᅦ+ᇀ
쎠	U+C3A0	—	27-18	39-91	34-26	ᄊ+ᅧ+∅
쎡	U+C3A1	—	27-19	—	50-31	ᄊ+ᅧ+ᆨ
쎤	U+C3A4	—	27-20	—	50-32	ᄊ+ᅧ+ᆫ
쎧	U+C3A7	—	27-21	—	—	ᄊ+ᅧ+ᆮ
쎨	U+C3A8	—	27-22	—	—	ᄊ+ᅧ+ᆯ
쎰	U+C3B0	—	27-23	—	50-33	ᄊ+ᅧ+ᆷ
쎱	U+C3B1	—	27-24	—	50-34	ᄊ+ᅧ+ᆸ
쎳	U+C3B3	—	27-25	—	—	ᄊ+ᅧ+ᆺ
쎴	U+C3B4	—	27-26	—	—	ᄊ+ᅧ+ᆻ
쎵	U+C3B5	—	27-27	—	50-35	ᄊ+ᅧ+ᆼ
쎼	U+C3BC	—	27-28	40-60	50-60	ᄊ+ᅨ+∅
쎽	U+C3BD	—	27-29	—	—	ᄊ+ᅨ+ᆨ
쏀	U+C3C0	29-77	—	40-61	—	ᄊ+ᅨ+ᆫ
쏌	U+C3CC	—	27-30	—	—	ᄊ+ᅨ+ᆷ
쏍	U+C3CD	—	27-31	—	—	ᄊ+ᅨ+ᆸ
쏏	U+C3CF	—	27-32	—	—	ᄊ+ᅨ+ᆺ
쏐	U+C3D0	—	27-33	—	—	ᄊ+ᅨ+ᆻ
쏑	U+C3D1	—	27-34	—	50-61	ᄊ+ᅨ+ᆼ
쏘	U+C3D8	29-78	—	39-92	34-27	ᄊ+ᅩ+∅
쏙	U+C3D9	29-79	—	39-93	34-28	ᄊ+ᅩ+ᆨ
쏜	U+C3DC	29-80	—	39-94	34-29	ᄊ+ᅩ+ᆫ
쏟	U+C3DF	29-81	—	40-01	34-30	ᄊ+ᅩ+ᆮ
쏠	U+C3E0	29-82	—	40-02	34-31	ᄊ+ᅩ+ᆯ
쏢	U+C3E2	29-83	—	40-03	34-32	ᄊ+ᅩ+ᆱ
쏨	U+C3E8	29-84	—	40-04	34-33	ᄊ+ᅩ+ᆷ
쏩	U+C3E9	29-85	—	40-05	34-34	ᄊ+ᅩ+ᆸ
쏫	U+C3EB	—	27-35	40-06	50-36	ᄊ+ᅩ+ᆺ
쏭	U+C3ED	29-86	—	40-07	34-35	ᄊ+ᅩ+ᆼ
쏱	U+C3F1	—	27-36	—	—	ᄊ+ᅩ+ᇀ
쏴	U+C3F4	29-87	—	40-75	34-81	ᄊ+ᅪ+∅
쏵	U+C3F5	29-88	—	40-76	50-73	ᄊ+ᅪ+ᆨ
쏸	U+C3F8	29-89	—	40-77	50-74	ᄊ+ᅪ+ᆫ
쏻	U+C3FB	—	27-37	—	50-75	ᄊ+ᅪ+ᆮ
쏼	U+C3FC	—	27-38	40-78	34-82	ᄊ+ᅪ+ᆯ
쐄	U+C404	—	27-39	—	—	ᄊ+ᅪ+ᆷ
쐅	U+C405	—	27-40	—	—	ᄊ+ᅪ+ᆸ
쐇	U+C407	—	27-41	40-79	34-83	ᄊ+ᅪ+ᆺ
쐈	U+C408	29-90	—	40-81	34-84	ᄊ+ᅪ+ᆻ
쐉	U+C409	—	27-42	40-80	50-76	ᄊ+ᅪ+ᆼ
쐐	U+C410	29-91	—	40-84	34-87	ᄊ+ᅫ+∅
쐑	U+C411	—	27-43	40-85	34-88	ᄊ+ᅫ+ᆨ
쐔	U+C414	—	27-44	—	—	ᄊ+ᅫ+ᆫ
쐗	U+C417	—	27-45	—	50-79	ᄊ+ᅫ+ᆮ
쐘	U+C418	—	27-46	—	—	ᄊ+ᅫ+ᆯ
쐣	U+C423	—	27-47	—	50-80	ᄊ+ᅫ+ᆺ
쐤	U+C424	29-92	—	40-86	50-81	ᄊ+ᅫ+ᆻ
쐬	U+C42C	29-93	—	40-62	34-73	ᄊ+ᅬ+∅
쐭	U+C42D	—	27-48	40-63	34-74	ᄊ+ᅬ+ᆨ
쐰	U+C430	29-94	—	40-64	34-75	ᄊ+ᅬ+ᆫ
쐳	U+C433	—	27-49	—	50-62	ᄊ+ᅬ+ᆮ
쐴	U+C434	30-01	—	40-65	34-76	ᄊ+ᅬ+ᆯ
쐼	U+C43C	30-02	—	40-66	34-77	ᄊ+ᅬ+ᆷ
쐽	U+C43D	30-03	—	40-67	34-78	ᄊ+ᅬ+ᆸ
쐿	U+C43F	—	27-50	—	50-63	ᄊ+ᅬ+ᆺ
쑀	U+C440	—	27-51	40-68	50-65	ᄊ+ᅬ+ᆻ
쑁	U+C441	—	27-52	—	50-64	ᄊ+ᅬ+ᆼ
쑈	U+C448	30-04	—	40-08	34-36	ᄊ+ᅭ+∅
쑉	U+C449	—	27-53	—	50-37	ᄊ+ᅭ+ᆨ
쑌	U+C44C	—	27-54	40-09	50-38	ᄊ+ᅭ+ᆫ
쑏	U+C44F	—	27-55	—	—	ᄊ+ᅭ+ᆮ
쑐	U+C450	—	27-56	40-10	34-37	ᄊ+ᅭ+ᆯ
쑘	U+C458	—	27-57	40-11	—	ᄊ+ᅭ+ᆷ
쑙	U+C459	—	27-58	—	—	ᄊ+ᅭ+ᆸ
쑛	U+C45B	—	27-59	—	—	ᄊ+ᅭ+ᆺ
쑝	U+C45D	—	27-60	40-12	—	ᄊ+ᅭ+ᆼ
쑤	U+C464	30-05	—	40-13	34-38	ᄊ+ᅮ+∅
쑥	U+C465	30-06	—	40-14	34-39	ᄊ+ᅮ+ᆨ
쑨	U+C468	30-07	—	40-15	34-40	ᄊ+ᅮ+ᆫ
쑫	U+C46B	—	27-61	—	50-39	ᄊ+ᅮ+ᆮ
쑬	U+C46C	30-08	—	40-16	34-41	ᄊ+ᅮ+ᆯ
쑴	U+C474	30-09	—	40-17	34-42	ᄊ+ᅮ+ᆷ
쑵	U+C475	30-10	—	40-18	34-43	ᄊ+ᅮ+ᆸ
쑷	U+C477	—	27-62	—	50-40	ᄊ+ᅮ+ᆺ
쑹	U+C479	30-11	—	40-19	34-44	ᄊ+ᅮ+ᆼ
쑾	U+C47E	—	27-63	—	50-41	ᄊ+ᅮ+ᇁ
쒀	U+C480	30-12	—	40-82	34-85	ᄊ+ᅯ+∅
쒁	U+C481	—	27-64	—	—	ᄊ+ᅯ+ᆨ
쒄	U+C484	—	27-65	—	—	ᄊ+ᅯ+ᆫ
쒇	U+C487	—	27-66	—	50-77	ᄊ+ᅯ+ᆮ
쒈	U+C488	—	27-67	—	—	ᄊ+ᅯ+ᆯ
쒐	U+C490	—	27-68	—	—	ᄊ+ᅯ+ᆷ
쒑	U+C491	—	27-69	—	—	ᄊ+ᅯ+ᆸ
쒓	U+C493	—	27-70	—	50-78	ᄊ+ᅯ+ᆺ
쒔	U+C494	30-13	—	40-83	34-86	ᄊ+ᅯ+ᆻ
쒕	U+C495	—	27-71	—	—	ᄊ+ᅯ+ᆼ
쒜	U+C49C	30-14	—	40-87	34-89	ᄊ+ᅰ+∅
쒝	U+C49D	—	27-72	—	—	ᄊ+ᅰ+ᆨ
쒠	U+C4A0	—	27-73	40-88	50-82	ᄊ+ᅰ+ᆫ
쒣	U+C4A3	—	27-74	—	50-83	ᄊ+ᅰ+ᆮ
쒤	U+C4A4	—	27-75	—	50-84	ᄊ+ᅰ+ᆯ
쒬	U+C4AC	—	27-76	—	50-85	ᄊ+ᅰ+ᆷ
쒭	U+C4AD	—	27-77	40-89	50-86	ᄊ+ᅰ+ᆸ
쒯	U+C4AF	—	27-78	—	—	ᄊ+ᅰ+ᆺ
쒰	U+C4B0	—	27-79	—	50-87	ᄊ+ᅰ+ᆻ
쒱	U+C4B1	—	27-80	—	—	ᄊ+ᅰ+ᆼ
쒸	U+C4B8	30-15	—	40-69	34-79	ᄊ+ᅱ+∅
쒹	U+C4B9	—	27-81	—	—	ᄊ+ᅱ+ᆨ
쒼	U+C4BC	30-16	—	40-70	50-66	ᄊ+ᅱ+ᆫ
쒿	U+C4BF	—	27-82	—	—	ᄊ+ᅱ+ᆮ
쓀	U+C4C0	—	27-83	—	—	ᄊ+ᅱ+ᆯ
쓈	U+C4C8	—	27-84	—	50-67	ᄊ+ᅱ+ᆷ
쓉	U+C4C9	—	27-85	—	—	ᄊ+ᅱ+ᆸ
쓋	U+C4CB	—	27-86	—	—	ᄊ+ᅱ+ᆺ
쓍	U+C4CD	—	27-87	—	—	ᄊ+ᅱ+ᆼ
쓓	U+C4D3	—	27-88	—	—	ᄊ+ᅱ+ᇂ
쓔	U+C4D4	—	27-89	40-20	34-45	ᄊ+ᅲ+∅
쓕	U+C4D5	—	27-90	—	50-42	ᄊ+ᅲ+ᆨ
쓘	U+C4D8	—	27-91	40-21	50-43	ᄊ+ᅲ+ᆫ
쓛	U+C4DB	—	27-92	—	—	ᄊ+ᅲ+ᆮ
쓜	U+C4DC	—	27-93	—	50-44	ᄊ+ᅲ+ᆯ
쓤	U+C4E4	—	27-94	—	—	ᄊ+ᅲ+ᆷ
쓥	U+C4E5	—	28-01	—	—	ᄊ+ᅲ+ᆸ
쓧	U+C4E7	—	28-02	40-22	—	ᄊ+ᅲ+ᆺ
쓩	U+C4E9	30-17	—	40-23	50-45	ᄊ+ᅲ+ᆼ
쓰	U+C4F0	30-18	—	40-24	34-46	ᄊ+ᅳ+∅
쓱	U+C4F1	30-19	—	40-25	34-47	ᄊ+ᅳ+ᆨ
쓴	U+C4F4	30-20	—	40-26	34-48	ᄊ+ᅳ+ᆫ
쓷	U+C4F7	—	28-03	—	50-46	ᄊ+ᅳ+ᆮ
쓸	U+C4F8	30-21	—	40-27	34-49	ᄊ+ᅳ+ᆯ
쓺	U+C4FA	30-22	—	40-28	34-50	ᄊ+ᅳ+ᆱ
쓿	U+C4FF	30-23	—	40-29	34-51	ᄊ+ᅳ+ᆶ
씀	U+C500	30-24	—	40-30	34-52	ᄊ+ᅳ+ᆷ
씁	U+C501	30-25	—	40-31	34-53	ᄊ+ᅳ+ᆸ
씃	U+C503	—	28-04	—	50-47	ᄊ+ᅳ+ᆺ
씅	U+C505	—	28-05	40-32	50-48	ᄊ+ᅳ+ᆼ
씌	U+C50C	30-26	—	40-71	34-80	ᄊ+ᅴ+∅
씍	U+C50D	—	28-06	—	—	ᄊ+ᅴ+ᆨ
씐	U+C510	30-27	—	40-72	50-68	ᄊ+ᅴ+ᆫ
씔	U+C514	30-28	—	40-73	50-69	ᄊ+ᅴ+ᆯ
씜	U+C51C	30-29	—	40-74	50-70	ᄊ+ᅴ+ᆷ
씝	U+C51D	—	28-07	—	50-71	ᄊ+ᅴ+ᆸ
씟	U+C51F	—	28-08	—	—	ᄊ+ᅴ+ᆺ
씡	U+C521	—	28-09	—	50-72	ᄊ+ᅴ+ᆼ
씨	U+C528	30-30	—	40-33	34-54	ᄊ+ᅵ+∅
씩	U+C529	30-31	—	40-34	34-55	ᄊ+ᅵ+ᆨ
씬	U+C52C	30-32	—	40-35	34-56	ᄊ+ᅵ+ᆫ
씯	U+C52F	—	28-10	40-36	50-49	ᄊ+ᅵ+ᆮ
씰	U+C530	30-33	—	40-37	34-57	ᄊ+ᅵ+ᆯ
씱	U+C531	—	28-11	—	50-50	ᄊ+ᅵ+ᆰ
씸	U+C538	30-34	—	40-38	34-58	ᄊ+ᅵ+ᆷ
씹	U+C539	30-35	—	40-39	34-59	ᄊ+ᅵ+ᆸ
씻	U+C53B	30-36	—	40-40	34-60	ᄊ+ᅵ+ᆺ
씼	U+C53C	—	28-12	40-42	—	ᄊ+ᅵ+ᆻ
씽	U+C53D	30-37	—	40-41	34-61	ᄊ+ᅵ+ᆼ
씿	U+C53F	—	28-13	—	50-51	ᄊ+ᅵ+ᆾ
앀	U+C540	—	28-14	—	—	ᄊ+ᅵ+ᆿ
앃	U+C543	—	28-15	—	—	ᄊ+ᅵ+ᇂ
아	U+C544	30-38	—	42-13	35-81	ᄋ+ᅡ+∅
악	U+C545	30-39	—	42-14	35-82	ᄋ+ᅡ+ᆨ
안	U+C548	30-40	—	42-15	35-83	ᄋ+ᅡ+ᆫ
앉	U+C549	30-41	—	42-16	35-84	ᄋ+ᅡ+ᆬ
않	U+C54A	30-42	—	42-17	35-85	ᄋ+ᅡ+ᆭ
앋	U+C54B	—	28-16	—	51-54	ᄋ+ᅡ+ᆮ
알	U+C54C	30-43	—	42-18	35-86	ᄋ+ᅡ+ᆯ
앍	U+C54D	30-44	—	42-19	35-87	ᄋ+ᅡ+ᆰ
앎	U+C54E	30-45	—	42-20	35-88	ᄋ+ᅡ+ᆱ
앏	U+C54F	—	28-17	—	51-55	ᄋ+ᅡ+ᆲ
앒	U+C552	—	28-18	42-21	51-56	ᄋ+ᅡ+ᆵ
앓	U+C553	30-46	—	42-22	35-89	ᄋ+ᅡ+ᆶ
암	U+C554	30-47	—	42-23	35-90	ᄋ+ᅡ+ᆷ
압	U+C555	30-48	—	42-24	35-91	ᄋ+ᅡ+ᆸ
앖	U+C556	—	28-19	—	—	ᄋ+ᅡ+ᆹ
앗	U+C557	30-49	—	42-25	35-92	ᄋ+ᅡ+ᆺ
았	U+C558	30-50	—	42-30	36-01	ᄋ+ᅡ+ᆻ
앙	U+C559	30-51	—	42-26	35-93	ᄋ+ᅡ+ᆼ
앚	U+C55A	—	28-20	—	—	ᄋ+ᅡ+ᆽ
앛	U+C55B	—	28-21	—	51-57	ᄋ+ᅡ+ᆾ
앝	U+C55D	30-52	—	42-27	51-58	ᄋ+ᅡ+ᇀ
앞	U+C55E	30-53	—	42-28	35-94	ᄋ+ᅡ+ᇁ
앟	U+C55F	—	28-22	42-29	51-59	ᄋ+ᅡ+ᇂ
애	U+C560	30-54	—	43-57	37-25	ᄋ+ᅢ+∅
액	U+C561	30-55	—	43-58	37-26	ᄋ+ᅢ+ᆨ
앤	U+C564	30-56	—	43-59	37-27	ᄋ+ᅢ+ᆫ
앧	U+C567	—	28-23	—	51-92	ᄋ+ᅢ+ᆮ
앨	U+C568	30-57	—	43-60	37-28	ᄋ+ᅢ+ᆯ
앰	U+C570	30-58	—	43-61	37-29	ᄋ+ᅢ+ᆷ
앱	U+C571	30-59	—	43-62	51-93	ᄋ+ᅢ+ᆸ
앳	U+C573	30-60	—	43-63	51-94	ᄋ+ᅢ+ᆺ
앴	U+C574	30-61	—	43-65	—	ᄋ+ᅢ+ᆻ
앵	U+C575	30-62	—	43-64	37-30	ᄋ+ᅢ+ᆼ
앹	U+C579	—	28-24	—	—	ᄋ+ᅢ+ᇀ
앺	U+C57A	—	28-25	—	—	ᄋ+ᅢ+ᇁ
야	U+C57C	30-63	—	42-31	36-03	ᄋ+ᅣ+∅
약	U+C57D	30-64	—	42-32	36-04	ᄋ+ᅣ+ᆨ
앾	U+C57E	—	28-26	—	—	ᄋ+ᅣ+ᆩ
얀	U+C580	30-65	—	42-33	36-05	ᄋ+ᅣ+ᆫ
얃	U+C583	—	28-27	42-34	51-60	ᄋ+ᅣ+ᆮ
얄	U+C584	30-66	—	42-35	36-06	ᄋ+ᅣ+ᆯ
얇	U+C587	30-67	—	42-36	36-07	ᄋ+ᅣ+ᆲ
얌	U+C58C	30-68	—	42-37	36-08	ᄋ+ᅣ+ᆷ
얍	U+C58D	30-69	—	42-38	36-09	ᄋ+ᅣ+ᆸ
얏	U+C58F	30-70	—	42-39	36-10	ᄋ+ᅣ+ᆺ
얐	U+C590	—	28-28	42-43	—	ᄋ+ᅣ+ᆻ
양	U+C591	30-71	—	42-40	36-11	ᄋ+ᅣ+ᆼ
얒	U+C592	—	28-29	—	51-61	ᄋ+ᅣ+ᆽ
얔	U+C594	—	28-30	—	—	ᄋ+ᅣ+ᆿ
얕	U+C595	30-72	—	42-41	36-12	ᄋ+ᅣ+ᇀ
얗	U+C597	30-73	—	42-42	36-13	ᄋ+ᅣ+ᇂ
얘	U+C598	30-74	—	43-66	37-32	ᄋ+ᅤ+∅
얙	U+C599	—	28-31	—	—	ᄋ+ᅤ+ᆨ
얜	U+C59C	30-75	—	43-67	37-33	ᄋ+ᅤ+ᆫ
얟	U+C59F	—	28-32	—	52-01	ᄋ+ᅤ+ᆮ
얠	U+C5A0	30-76	—	43-68	37-34	ᄋ+ᅤ+ᆯ
얨	U+C5A8	—	28-33	—	52-02	ᄋ+ᅤ+ᆷ
얩	U+C5A9	30-77	—	43-69	52-03	ᄋ+ᅤ+ᆸ
얫	U+C5AB	—	28-34	—	52-04	ᄋ+ᅤ+ᆺ
얬	U+C5AC	—	28-35	—	—	ᄋ+ᅤ+ᆻ
얭	U+C5AD	—	28-36	—	52-05	ᄋ+ᅤ+ᆼ
어	U+C5B4	30-78	—	42-44	36-15	ᄋ+ᅥ+∅
억	U+C5B5	30-79	—	42-45	36-16	ᄋ+ᅥ+ᆨ
얶	U+C5B6	—	28-37	—	51-62	ᄋ+ᅥ+ᆩ
언	U+C5B8	30-80	—	42-46	36-17	ᄋ+ᅥ+ᆫ
얹	U+C5B9	30-81	—	42-47	36-18	ᄋ+ᅥ+ᆬ
얺	U+C5BA	—	28-38	—	—	ᄋ+ᅥ+ᆭ
얻	U+C5BB	30-82	—	42-48	36-19	ᄋ+ᅥ+ᆮ
얼	U+C5BC	30-83	—	42-49	36-20	ᄋ+ᅥ+ᆯ
얽	U+C5BD	30-84	—	42-50	36-21	ᄋ+ᅥ+ᆰ
얾	U+C5BE	30-85	—	42-51	36-22	ᄋ+ᅥ+ᆱ
얿	U+C5BF	—	28-39	—	—	ᄋ+ᅥ+ᆲ
엄	U+C5C4	30-86	—	42-52	36-23	ᄋ+ᅥ+ᆷ
업	U+C5C5	30-87	—	42-53	36-24	ᄋ+ᅥ+ᆸ
없	U+C5C6	30-88	—	42-54	36-25	ᄋ+ᅥ+ᆹ
엇	U+C5C7	30-89	—	42-55	36-26	ᄋ+ᅥ+ᆺ
었	U+C5C8	30-90	—	42-61	36-32	ᄋ+ᅥ+ᆻ
엉	U+C5C9	30-91	—	42-56	36-27	ᄋ+ᅥ+ᆼ
엊	U+C5CA	30-92	—	42-57	36-28	ᄋ+ᅥ+ᆽ
엌	U+C5CC	30-93	—	42-58	36-29	ᄋ+ᅥ+ᆿ
엎	U+C5CE	30-94	—	42-59	36-30	ᄋ+ᅥ+ᇁ
엏	U+C5CF	—	28-40	42-60	36-31	ᄋ+ᅥ+ᇂ
에	U+C5D0	31-01	—	43-70	37-36	ᄋ+ᅦ+∅
엑	U+C5D1	31-02	—	43-71	37-37	ᄋ+ᅦ+ᆨ
엔	U+C5D4	31-03	—	43-72	37-38	ᄋ+ᅦ+ᆫ
엗	U+C5D7	—	28-41	—	52-06	ᄋ+ᅦ+ᆮ
엘	U+C5D8	31-04	—	43-73	37-39	ᄋ+ᅦ+ᆯ
엠	U+C5E0	31-05	—	43-74	37-40	ᄋ+ᅦ+ᆷ
엡	U+C5E1	31-06	—	43-75	52-07	ᄋ+ᅦ+ᆸ
엣	U+C5E3	31-07	—	43-76	37-41	ᄋ+ᅦ+ᆺ
엤	U+C5E4	—	28-42	43-78	52-08	ᄋ+ᅦ+ᆻ
엥	U+C5E5	31-08	—	43-77	37-42	ᄋ+ᅦ+ᆼ
엩	U+C5E9	—	28-43	—	—	ᄋ+ᅦ+ᇀ
엪	U+C5EA	—	28-44	—	—	ᄋ+ᅦ+ᇁ
여	U+C5EC	31-09	—	42-62	36-34	ᄋ+ᅧ+∅
역	U+C5ED	31-10	—	42-63	36-35	ᄋ+ᅧ+ᆨ
엮	U+C5EE	31-11	—	42-77	36-49	ᄋ+ᅧ+ᆩ
연	U+C5F0	31-12	—	42-64	36-36	ᄋ+ᅧ+ᆫ
엱	U+C5F1	—	28-45	—	51-63	ᄋ+ᅧ+ᆬ
엳	U+C5F3	—	28-46	42-65	36-37	ᄋ+ᅧ+ᆮ
열	U+C5F4	31-13	—	42-66	36-38	ᄋ+ᅧ+ᆯ
엶	U+C5F6	31-14	—	42-67	36-39	ᄋ+ᅧ+ᆱ
엷	U+C5F7	31-15	—	42-68	36-40	ᄋ+ᅧ+ᆲ
엸	U+C5F8	—	28-47	—	51-64	ᄋ+ᅧ+ᆳ
염	U+C5FC	31-16	—	42-69	36-41	ᄋ+ᅧ+ᆷ
엽	U+C5FD	31-17	—	42-70	36-42	ᄋ+ᅧ+ᆸ
엾	U+C5FE	31-18	—	42-71	36-43	ᄋ+ᅧ+ᆹ
엿	U+C5FF	31-19	—	42-72	36-44	ᄋ+ᅧ+ᆺ
였	U+C600	31-20	—	42-78	36-50	ᄋ+ᅧ+ᆻ
영	U+C601	31-21	—	42-73	36-45	ᄋ+ᅧ+ᆼ
옄	U+C604	—	28-48	—	—	ᄋ+ᅧ+ᆿ
옅	U+C605	31-22	—	42-74	36-46	ᄋ+ᅧ+ᇀ
옆	U+C606	31-23	—	42-75	36-47	ᄋ+ᅧ+ᇁ
옇	U+C607	31-24	—	42-76	36-48	ᄋ+ᅧ+ᇂ
예	U+C608	31-25	—	43-79	37-44	ᄋ+ᅨ+∅
옉	U+C609	—	28-49	—	52-09	ᄋ+ᅨ+ᆨ
옌	U+C60C	31-26	—	43-80	37-45	ᄋ+ᅨ+ᆫ
옏	U+C60F	—	28-50	—	52-10	ᄋ+ᅨ+ᆮ
옐	U+C610	31-27	—	43-81	52-11	ᄋ+ᅨ+ᆯ
옘	U+C618	31-28	—	43-82	37-46	ᄋ+ᅨ+ᆷ
옙	U+C619	31-29	—	43-83	37-47	ᄋ+ᅨ+ᆸ
옛	U+C61B	31-30	—	43-84	37-48	ᄋ+ᅨ+ᆺ
옜	U+C61C	31-31	—	43-86	37-49	ᄋ+ᅨ+ᆻ
옝	U+C61D	—	28-51	43-85	52-12	ᄋ+ᅨ+ᆼ
옠	U+C620	—	28-52	—	—	ᄋ+ᅨ+ᆿ
오	U+C624	31-32	—	42-79	36-52	ᄋ+ᅩ+∅
옥	U+C625	31-33	—	42-80	36-53	ᄋ+ᅩ+ᆨ
옦	U+C626	—	28-53	—	—	ᄋ+ᅩ+ᆩ
온	U+C628	31-34	—	42-81	36-54	ᄋ+ᅩ+ᆫ
옪	U+C62A	—	28-54	—	—	ᄋ+ᅩ+ᆭ
옫	U+C62B	—	28-55	—	51-65	ᄋ+ᅩ+ᆮ
올	U+C62C	31-35	—	42-82	36-55	ᄋ+ᅩ+ᆯ
옭	U+C62D	31-36	—	42-83	36-56	ᄋ+ᅩ+ᆰ
옮	U+C62E	31-37	—	42-84	36-57	ᄋ+ᅩ+ᆱ
옯	U+C62F	—	28-56	—	—	ᄋ+ᅩ+ᆲ
옰	U+C630	31-38	—	42-85	36-58	ᄋ+ᅩ+ᆳ
옲	U+C632	—	28-57	—	—	ᄋ+ᅩ+ᆵ
옳	U+C633	31-39	—	42-86	36-59	ᄋ+ᅩ+ᆶ
옴	U+C634	31-40	—	42-87	36-60	ᄋ+ᅩ+ᆷ
옵	U+C635	31-41	—	42-88	36-61	ᄋ+ᅩ+ᆸ
옷	U+C637	31-42	—	42-89	36-62	ᄋ+ᅩ+ᆺ
옹	U+C639	31-43	—	42-90	36-63	ᄋ+ᅩ+ᆼ
옺	U+C63A	—	28-58	—	51-66	ᄋ+ᅩ+ᆽ
옻	U+C63B	31-44	—	42-91	36-64	ᄋ+ᅩ+ᆾ
옽	U+C63D	—	28-59	—	—	ᄋ+ᅩ+ᇀ
옾	U+C63E	—	28-60	42-92	—	ᄋ+ᅩ+ᇁ
와	U+C640	31-45	—	44-14	37-68	ᄋ+ᅪ+∅
왁	U+C641	31-46	—	44-15	37-69	ᄋ+ᅪ+ᆨ
완	U+C644	31-47	—	44-16	37-70	ᄋ+ᅪ+ᆫ
왇	U+C647	—	28-61	44-17	52-24	ᄋ+ᅪ+ᆮ
왈	U+C648	31-48	—	44-18	37-71	ᄋ+ᅪ+ᆯ
왐	U+C650	31-49	—	44-19	52-25	ᄋ+ᅪ+ᆷ
왑	U+C651	31-50	—	44-20	52-26	ᄋ+ᅪ+ᆸ
왓	U+C653	31-51	—	44-21	37-72	ᄋ+ᅪ+ᆺ
왔	U+C654	31-52	—	44-23	37-74	ᄋ+ᅪ+ᆻ
왕	U+C655	31-53	—	44-22	37-73	ᄋ+ᅪ+ᆼ
왘	U+C658	—	28-62	—	—	ᄋ+ᅪ+ᆿ
왙	U+C659	—	28-63	—	52-27	ᄋ+ᅪ+ᇀ
왜	U+C65C	31-54	—	44-33	37-84	ᄋ+ᅫ+∅
왝	U+C65D	31-55	—	44-34	37-85	ᄋ+ᅫ+ᆨ
왠	U+C660	31-56	—	44-35	52-32	ᄋ+ᅫ+ᆫ
왣	U+C663	—	28-64	—	52-33	ᄋ+ᅫ+ᆮ
왤	U+C664	—	28-65	—	52-34	ᄋ+ᅫ+ᆯ
왬	U+C66C	31-57	—	44-36	—	ᄋ+ᅫ+ᆷ
왭	U+C66D	—	28-66	—	—	ᄋ+ᅫ+ᆸ
왯	U+C66F	31-58	—	44-37	52-35	ᄋ+ᅫ+ᆺ
왰	U+C670	—	28-67	—	37-87	ᄋ+ᅫ+ᆻ
왱	U+C671	31-59	—	44-38	37-86	ᄋ+ᅫ+ᆼ
외	U+C678	31-60	—	43-87	37-51	ᄋ+ᅬ+∅
왹	U+C679	31-61	—	43-88	52-13	ᄋ+ᅬ+ᆨ
왼	U+C67C	31-62	—	43-89	37-52	ᄋ+ᅬ+ᆫ
왿	U+C67F	—	28-68	—	52-14	ᄋ+ᅬ+ᆮ
욀	U+C680	31-63	—	43-90	37-53	ᄋ+ᅬ+ᆯ
욂	U+C682	—	28-69	—	—	ᄋ+ᅬ+ᆱ
욈	U+C688	31-64	—	43-91	37-54	ᄋ+ᅬ+ᆷ
욉	U+C689	31-65	—	43-92	37-55	ᄋ+ᅬ+ᆸ
욋	U+C68B	31-66	—	43-93	37-56	ᄋ+ᅬ+ᆺ
욌	U+C68C	—	28-70	—	52-15	ᄋ+ᅬ+ᆻ
욍	U+C68D	31-67	—	43-94	37-57	ᄋ+ᅬ+ᆼ
욒	U+C692	—	28-71	—	—	ᄋ+ᅬ+ᇁ
요	U+C694	31-68	—	42-93	36-66	ᄋ+ᅭ+∅
욕	U+C695	31-69	—	42-94	36-67	ᄋ+ᅭ+ᆨ
욘	U+C698	31-70	—	43-01	51-67	ᄋ+ᅭ+ᆫ
욛	U+C69B	—	28-72	—	51-68	ᄋ+ᅭ+ᆮ
욜	U+C69C	31-71	—	43-02	51-69	ᄋ+ᅭ+ᆯ
욝	U+C69D	—	28-73	—	—	ᄋ+ᅭ+ᆰ
욤	U+C6A4	31-72	—	43-03	36-68	ᄋ+ᅭ+ᆷ
욥	U+C6A5	31-73	—	43-04	51-70	ᄋ+ᅭ+ᆸ
욧	U+C6A7	31-74	—	43-05	51-71	ᄋ+ᅭ+ᆺ
용	U+C6A9	31-75	—	43-06	36-69	ᄋ+ᅭ+ᆼ
욬	U+C6AC	—	28-74	—	—	ᄋ+ᅭ+ᆿ
우	U+C6B0	31-76	—	43-07	36-71	ᄋ+ᅮ+∅
욱	U+C6B1	31-77	—	43-08	36-72	ᄋ+ᅮ+ᆨ
운	U+C6B4	31-78	—	43-09	36-73	ᄋ+ᅮ+ᆫ
욷	U+C6B7	—	28-75	—	51-72	ᄋ+ᅮ+ᆮ
울	U+C6B8	31-79	—	43-10	36-74	ᄋ+ᅮ+ᆯ
욹	U+C6B9	31-80	—	43-11	51-73	ᄋ+ᅮ+ᆰ
욺	U+C6BA	31-81	—	43-12	36-75	ᄋ+ᅮ+ᆱ
욼	U+C6BC	—	28-76	—	51-74	ᄋ+ᅮ+ᆳ
움	U+C6C0	31-82	—	43-13	36-76	ᄋ+ᅮ+ᆷ
웁	U+C6C1	31-83	—	43-14	36-77	ᄋ+ᅮ+ᆸ
웂	U+C6C2	—	28-77	—	—	ᄋ+ᅮ+ᆹ
웃	U+C6C3	31-84	—	43-15	36-78	ᄋ+ᅮ+ᆺ
웅	U+C6C5	31-85	—	43-16	36-79	ᄋ+ᅮ+ᆼ
웆	U+C6C6	—	28-78	—	51-75	ᄋ+ᅮ+ᆽ
웇	U+C6C7	—	28-79	—	51-76	ᄋ+ᅮ+ᆾ
웉	U+C6C9	—	28-80	—	51-77	ᄋ+ᅮ+ᇀ
워	U+C6CC	31-86	—	44-24	37-76	ᄋ+ᅯ+∅
웍	U+C6CD	31-87	—	44-25	37-77	ᄋ+ᅯ+ᆨ
원	U+C6D0	31-88	—	44-26	37-78	ᄋ+ᅯ+ᆫ
웒	U+C6D2	—	28-81	—	—	ᄋ+ᅯ+ᆭ
웓	U+C6D3	—	28-82	—	52-28	ᄋ+ᅯ+ᆮ
월	U+C6D4	31-89	—	44-27	37-79	ᄋ+ᅯ+ᆯ
웘	U+C6D8	—	—	—	52-29	ᄋ+ᅯ+ᆳ
웜	U+C6DC	31-90	—	44-28	37-80	ᄋ+ᅯ+ᆷ
웝	U+C6DD	31-91	—	44-29	52-30	ᄋ+ᅯ+ᆸ
웟	U+C6DF	—	28-83	44-30	52-31	ᄋ+ᅯ+ᆺ
웠	U+C6E0	31-92	—	44-32	37-82	ᄋ+ᅯ+ᆻ
웡	U+C6E1	31-93	—	44-31	37-81	ᄋ+ᅯ+ᆼ
웤	U+C6E4	—	28-84	—	—	ᄋ+ᅯ+ᆿ
웥	U+C6E5	—	28-85	—	—	ᄋ+ᅯ+ᇀ
웨	U+C6E8	31-94	—	44-39	37-89	ᄋ+ᅰ+∅
웩	U+C6E9	32-01	—	44-40	37-90	ᄋ+ᅰ+ᆨ
웬	U+C6EC	32-02	—	44-41	37-91	ᄋ+ᅰ+ᆫ
웯	U+C6EF	—	28-86	—	52-36	ᄋ+ᅰ+ᆮ
웰	U+C6F0	32-03	—	44-42	37-92	ᄋ+ᅰ+ᆯ
웸	U+C6F8	32-04	—	44-43	52-37	ᄋ+ᅰ+ᆷ
웹	U+C6F9	32-05	—	44-44	52-38	ᄋ+ᅰ+ᆸ
웻	U+C6FB	—	28-87	44-45	52-39	ᄋ+ᅰ+ᆺ
웼	U+C6FC	—	28-88	—	52-40	ᄋ+ᅰ+ᆻ
웽	U+C6FD	32-06	—	44-46	37-93	ᄋ+ᅰ+ᆼ
윁	U+C701	—	28-89	44-47	37-94	ᄋ+ᅰ+ᇀ
위	U+C704	32-07	—	44-01	37-59	ᄋ+ᅱ+∅
윅	U+C705	32-08	—	44-02	52-16	ᄋ+ᅱ+ᆨ
윈	U+C708	32-09	—	44-03	37-60	ᄋ+ᅱ+ᆫ
윋	U+C70B	—	28-90	—	52-17	ᄋ+ᅱ+ᆮ
윌	U+C70C	32-10	—	44-04	37-61	ᄋ+ᅱ+ᆯ
윎	U+C70E	—	28-91	—	—	ᄋ+ᅱ+ᆱ
윓	U+C713	—	28-92	—	—	ᄋ+ᅱ+ᆶ
윔	U+C714	32-11	—	44-05	37-62	ᄋ+ᅱ+ᆷ
윕	U+C715	32-12	—	44-06	52-18	ᄋ+ᅱ+ᆸ
윗	U+C717	32-13	—	44-07	37-63	ᄋ+ᅱ+ᆺ
윘	U+C718	—	28-93	—	—	ᄋ+ᅱ+ᆻ
윙	U+C719	32-14	—	44-08	37-64	ᄋ+ᅱ+ᆼ
윜	U+C71C	—	28-94	—	—	ᄋ+ᅱ+ᆿ
윝	U+C71D	—	29-01	—	—	ᄋ+ᅱ+ᇀ
유	U+C720	32-15	—	43-17	36-81	ᄋ+ᅲ+∅
육	U+C721	32-16	—	43-18	36-82	ᄋ+ᅲ+ᆨ
윤	U+C724	32-17	—	43-19	36-83	ᄋ+ᅲ+ᆫ
윧	U+C727	—	29-02	—	51-78	ᄋ+ᅲ+ᆮ
율	U+C728	32-18	—	43-20	36-84	ᄋ+ᅲ+ᆯ
윰	U+C730	32-19	—	43-21	51-79	ᄋ+ᅲ+ᆷ
윱	U+C731	32-20	—	43-22	51-80	ᄋ+ᅲ+ᆸ
윳	U+C733	32-21	—	43-23	51-81	ᄋ+ᅲ+ᆺ
융	U+C735	32-22	—	43-24	36-85	ᄋ+ᅲ+ᆼ
윶	U+C736	—	29-03	—	—	ᄋ+ᅲ+ᆽ
윷	U+C737	32-23	—	43-25	36-86	ᄋ+ᅲ+ᆾ
윸	U+C738	—	29-04	—	—	ᄋ+ᅲ+ᆿ
윹	U+C739	—	29-05	—	51-82	ᄋ+ᅲ+ᇀ
으	U+C73C	32-24	—	43-26	36-88	ᄋ+ᅳ+∅
윽	U+C73D	32-25	—	43-27	36-89	ᄋ+ᅳ+ᆨ
은	U+C740	32-26	—	43-28	36-90	ᄋ+ᅳ+ᆫ
읃	U+C743	—	29-06	43-29	36-91	ᄋ+ᅳ+ᆮ
을	U+C744	32-27	—	43-30	36-92	ᄋ+ᅳ+ᆯ
읅	U+C745	—	29-07	43-31	51-83	ᄋ+ᅳ+ᆰ
읆	U+C746	—	29-08	—	51-84	ᄋ+ᅳ+ᆱ
읇	U+C747	—	29-09	—	51-85	ᄋ+ᅳ+ᆲ
읊	U+C74A	32-28	—	43-32	36-93	ᄋ+ᅳ+ᆵ
음	U+C74C	32-29	—	43-33	36-94	ᄋ+ᅳ+ᆷ
읍	U+C74D	32-30	—	43-34	37-01	ᄋ+ᅳ+ᆸ
읎	U+C74E	—	29-10	—	51-86	ᄋ+ᅳ+ᆹ
읏	U+C74F	32-31	—	43-35	37-02	ᄋ+ᅳ+ᆺ
응	U+C751	32-32	—	43-36	37-03	ᄋ+ᅳ+ᆼ
읒	U+C752	32-33	—	43-37	37-04	ᄋ+ᅳ+ᆽ
읓	U+C753	32-34	—	43-38	37-05	ᄋ+ᅳ+ᆾ
읔	U+C754	32-35	—	43-39	37-06	ᄋ+ᅳ+ᆿ
읕	U+C755	32-36	—	43-40	37-07	ᄋ+ᅳ+ᇀ
읖	U+C756	32-37	—	43-41	37-08	ᄋ+ᅳ+ᇁ
읗	U+C757	32-38	—	43-42	37-09	ᄋ+ᅳ+ᇂ
의	U+C758	32-39	—	44-09	37-66	ᄋ+ᅴ+∅
읙	U+C759	—	29-11	—	—	ᄋ+ᅴ+ᆨ
읜	U+C75C	32-40	—	44-10	52-19	ᄋ+ᅴ+ᆫ
읟	U+C75F	—	29-12	—	52-20	ᄋ+ᅴ+ᆮ
읠	U+C760	32-41	—	44-11	52-21	ᄋ+ᅴ+ᆯ
읦	U+C766	—	29-13	—	—	ᄋ+ᅴ+ᆵ
읨	U+C768	32-42	—	44-12	—	ᄋ+ᅴ+ᆷ
읩	U+C769	—	29-14	—	—	ᄋ+ᅴ+ᆸ
읫	U+C76B	32-43	—	44-13	52-22	ᄋ+ᅴ+ᆺ
읭	U+C76D	—	29-15	—	52-23	ᄋ+ᅴ+ᆼ
이	U+C774	32-44	—	43-43	37-11	ᄋ+ᅵ+∅
익	U+C775	32-45	—	43-44	37-12	ᄋ+ᅵ+ᆨ
인	U+C778	32-46	—	43-45	37-13	ᄋ+ᅵ+ᆫ
읻	U+C77B	—	29-16	—	51-87	ᄋ+ᅵ+ᆮ
일	U+C77C	32-47	—	43-46	37-14	ᄋ+ᅵ+ᆯ
읽	U+C77D	32-48	—	43-47	37-15	ᄋ+ᅵ+ᆰ
읾	U+C77E	32-49	—	43-48	51-88	ᄋ+ᅵ+ᆱ
잀	U+C780	—	29-17	—	51-89	ᄋ+ᅵ+ᆳ
잂	U+C782	—	29-18	—	—	ᄋ+ᅵ+ᆵ
잃	U+C783	32-50	—	43-49	37-16	ᄋ+ᅵ+ᆶ
임	U+C784	32-51	—	43-50	37-17	ᄋ+ᅵ+ᆷ
입	U+C785	32-52	—	43-51	37-18	ᄋ+ᅵ+ᆸ
잆	U+C786	—	29-19	—	51-90	ᄋ+ᅵ+ᆹ
잇	U+C787	32-53	—	43-52	37-19	ᄋ+ᅵ+ᆺ
있	U+C788	32-54	—	43-56	37-23	ᄋ+ᅵ+ᆻ
잉	U+C789	32-55	—	43-53	37-20	ᄋ+ᅵ+ᆼ
잊	U+C78A	32-56	—	43-54	37-21	ᄋ+ᅵ+ᆽ
잋	U+C78B	—	29-20	—	51-91	ᄋ+ᅵ+ᆾ
잌	U+C78C	—	29-21	—	—	ᄋ+ᅵ+ᆿ
잍	U+C78D	—	29-22	—	—	ᄋ+ᅵ+ᇀ
잎	U+C78E	32-57	—	43-55	37-22	ᄋ+ᅵ+ᇁ
잏	U+C78F	—	29-23	—	—	ᄋ+ᅵ+ᇂ
자	U+C790	32-58	—	27-84	25-21	ᄌ+ᅡ+∅
작	U+C791	32-59	—	27-85	25-22	ᄌ+ᅡ+ᆨ
잓	U+C793	—	29-24	—	43-79	ᄌ+ᅡ+ᆪ
잔	U+C794	32-60	—	27-86	25-23	ᄌ+ᅡ+ᆫ
잖	U+C796	32-61	—	27-87	25-24	ᄌ+ᅡ+ᆭ
잗	U+C797	32-62	—	27-88	25-25	ᄌ+ᅡ+ᆮ
잘	U+C798	32-63	—	27-89	25-26	ᄌ+ᅡ+ᆯ
잙	U+C799	—	29-25	—	43-80	ᄌ+ᅡ+ᆰ
잚	U+C79A	32-64	—	27-90	25-27	ᄌ+ᅡ+ᆱ
잠	U+C7A0	32-65	—	27-91	25-28	ᄌ+ᅡ+ᆷ
잡	U+C7A1	32-66	—	27-92	25-29	ᄌ+ᅡ+ᆸ
잣	U+C7A3	32-67	—	27-93	25-30	ᄌ+ᅡ+ᆺ
잤	U+C7A4	32-68	—	28-02	25-33	ᄌ+ᅡ+ᆻ
장	U+C7A5	32-69	—	27-94	25-31	ᄌ+ᅡ+ᆼ
잦	U+C7A6	32-70	—	28-01	25-32	ᄌ+ᅡ+ᆽ
잧	U+C7A7	—	29-26	—	—	ᄌ+ᅡ+ᆾ
잩	U+C7A9	—	29-27	—	43-81	ᄌ+ᅡ+ᇀ
잪	U+C7AA	—	29-28	—	—	ᄌ+ᅡ+ᇁ
잫	U+C7AB	—	29-29	—	—	ᄌ+ᅡ+ᇂ
재	U+C7AC	32-71	—	28-85	26-05	ᄌ+ᅢ+∅
잭	U+C7AD	32-72	—	28-86	44-33	ᄌ+ᅢ+ᆨ
잰	U+C7B0	32-73	—	28-87	26-06	ᄌ+ᅢ+ᆫ
잲	U+C7B2	—	29-30	—	44-34	ᄌ+ᅢ+ᆭ
잳	U+C7B3	—	29-31	—	44-35	ᄌ+ᅢ+ᆮ
잴	U+C7B4	32-74	—	28-88	26-07	ᄌ+ᅢ+ᆯ
잼	U+C7BC	32-75	—	28-89	26-08	ᄌ+ᅢ+ᆷ
잽	U+C7BD	32-76	—	28-90	26-09	ᄌ+ᅢ+ᆸ
잿	U+C7BF	32-77	—	28-91	26-10	ᄌ+ᅢ+ᆺ
쟀	U+C7C0	32-78	—	28-93	26-12	ᄌ+ᅢ+ᆻ
쟁	U+C7C1	32-79	—	28-92	26-11	ᄌ+ᅢ+ᆼ
쟂	U+C7C2	—	29-32	—	44-36	ᄌ+ᅢ+ᆽ
쟈	U+C7C8	32-80	—	28-03	25-34	ᄌ+ᅣ+∅
쟉	U+C7C9	32-81	—	28-04	25-35	ᄌ+ᅣ+ᆨ
쟌	U+C7CC	32-82	—	28-05	25-36	ᄌ+ᅣ+ᆫ
쟎	U+C7CE	32-83	—	28-06	—	ᄌ+ᅣ+ᆭ
쟏	U+C7CF	—	29-33	—	43-82	ᄌ+ᅣ+ᆮ
쟐	U+C7D0	32-84	—	28-07	25-37	ᄌ+ᅣ+ᆯ
쟘	U+C7D8	32-85	—	28-08	43-83	ᄌ+ᅣ+ᆷ
쟙	U+C7D9	—	29-34	28-09	43-84	ᄌ+ᅣ+ᆸ
쟛	U+C7DB	—	29-35	—	43-85	ᄌ+ᅣ+ᆺ
쟝	U+C7DD	32-86	—	28-10	25-38	ᄌ+ᅣ+ᆼ
쟤	U+C7E4	32-87	—	28-94	26-13	ᄌ+ᅤ+∅
쟨	U+C7E8	32-88	—	29-01	44-37	ᄌ+ᅤ+ᆫ
쟫	U+C7EB	—	29-36	—	—	ᄌ+ᅤ+ᆮ
쟬	U+C7EC	32-89	—	29-02	44-38	ᄌ+ᅤ+ᆯ
쟴	U+C7F4	—	29-37	—	44-39	ᄌ+ᅤ+ᆷ
쟵	U+C7F5	—	29-38	—	44-40	ᄌ+ᅤ+ᆸ
쟷	U+C7F7	—	29-39	—	—	ᄌ+ᅤ+ᆺ
쟹	U+C7F9	—	29-40	—	—	ᄌ+ᅤ+ᆼ
저	U+C800	32-90	—	28-11	25-39	ᄌ+ᅥ+∅
적	U+C801	32-91	—	28-12	25-40	ᄌ+ᅥ+ᆨ
젂	U+C802	—	29-41	—	43-90	ᄌ+ᅥ+ᆩ
전	U+C804	32-92	—	28-13	25-41	ᄌ+ᅥ+ᆫ
젆	U+C806	—	29-42	—	25-42	ᄌ+ᅥ+ᆭ
젇	U+C807	—	29-43	—	43-86	ᄌ+ᅥ+ᆮ
절	U+C808	32-93	—	28-14	25-43	ᄌ+ᅥ+ᆯ
젉	U+C809	—	29-44	—	43-87	ᄌ+ᅥ+ᆰ
젊	U+C80A	32-94	—	28-15	25-44	ᄌ+ᅥ+ᆱ
점	U+C810	33-01	—	28-16	25-45	ᄌ+ᅥ+ᆷ
접	U+C811	33-02	—	28-17	25-46	ᄌ+ᅥ+ᆸ
젓	U+C813	33-03	—	28-18	25-47	ᄌ+ᅥ+ᆺ
젔	U+C814	—	29-45	28-21	25-50	ᄌ+ᅥ+ᆻ
정	U+C815	33-04	—	28-19	25-48	ᄌ+ᅥ+ᆼ
젖	U+C816	33-05	—	28-20	25-49	ᄌ+ᅥ+ᆽ
젙	U+C819	—	29-46	—	43-88	ᄌ+ᅥ+ᇀ
젛	U+C81B	—	29-47	—	43-89	ᄌ+ᅥ+ᇂ
제	U+C81C	33-06	—	29-03	26-14	ᄌ+ᅦ+∅
젝	U+C81D	33-07	—	29-04	26-15	ᄌ+ᅦ+ᆨ
젠	U+C820	33-08	—	29-05	26-16	ᄌ+ᅦ+ᆫ
젣	U+C823	—	29-48	—	44-41	ᄌ+ᅦ+ᆮ
젤	U+C824	33-09	—	29-06	26-17	ᄌ+ᅦ+ᆯ
젬	U+C82C	33-10	—	29-07	26-18	ᄌ+ᅦ+ᆷ
젭	U+C82D	33-11	—	29-08	44-42	ᄌ+ᅦ+ᆸ
젯	U+C82F	33-12	—	29-09	44-43	ᄌ+ᅦ+ᆺ
젰	U+C830	—	29-49	29-12	26-20	ᄌ+ᅦ+ᆻ
젱	U+C831	33-13	—	29-10	26-19	ᄌ+ᅦ+ᆼ
젲	U+C832	—	29-50	—	44-44	ᄌ+ᅦ+ᆽ
젶	U+C836	—	—	29-11	—	ᄌ+ᅦ+ᇁ
져	U+C838	33-14	—	28-22	25-51	ᄌ+ᅧ+∅
젹	U+C839	—	29-51	28-23	43-91	ᄌ+ᅧ+ᆨ
젼	U+C83C	33-15	—	28-24	25-52	ᄌ+ᅧ+ᆫ
젿	U+C83F	—	29-52	—	43-92	ᄌ+ᅧ+ᆮ
졀	U+C840	33-16	—	28-25	43-93	ᄌ+ᅧ+ᆯ
졁	U+C841	—	29-53	—	43-94	ᄌ+ᅧ+ᆰ
졂	U+C842	—	29-54	—	44-01	ᄌ+ᅧ+ᆱ
졃	U+C843	—	29-55	—	44-02	ᄌ+ᅧ+ᆲ
졇	U+C847	—	29-56	—	—	ᄌ+ᅧ+ᆶ
졈	U+C848	33-17	—	28-26	44-03	ᄌ+ᅧ+ᆷ
졉	U+C849	33-18	—	28-27	44-04	ᄌ+ᅧ+ᆸ
졋	U+C84B	—	29-57	28-28	25-53	ᄌ+ᅧ+ᆺ
졌	U+C84C	33-19	—	28-30	25-54	ᄌ+ᅧ+ᆻ
졍	U+C84D	33-20	—	28-29	44-05	ᄌ+ᅧ+ᆼ
졎	U+C84E	—	29-58	—	44-06	ᄌ+ᅧ+ᆽ
졑	U+C851	—	29-59	—	44-07	ᄌ+ᅧ+ᇀ
졓	U+C853	—	29-60	—	44-08	ᄌ+ᅧ+ᇂ
졔	U+C854	33-21	—	29-13	44-45	ᄌ+ᅨ+∅
졕	U+C855	—	29-61	—	—	ᄌ+ᅨ+ᆨ
졘	U+C858	—	29-62	29-14	44-46	ᄌ+ᅨ+ᆫ
졜	U+C85C	—	29-63	29-15	—	ᄌ+ᅨ+ᆯ
졤	U+C864	—	29-64	—	—	ᄌ+ᅨ+ᆷ
졥	U+C865	—	29-65	—	—	ᄌ+ᅨ+ᆸ
졧	U+C867	—	29-66	—	44-47	ᄌ+ᅨ+ᆺ
졩	U+C869	—	29-67	—	44-48	ᄌ+ᅨ+ᆼ
조	U+C870	33-22	—	28-31	25-55	ᄌ+ᅩ+∅
족	U+C871	33-23	—	28-32	25-56	ᄌ+ᅩ+ᆨ
존	U+C874	33-24	—	28-33	25-57	ᄌ+ᅩ+ᆫ
졷	U+C877	—	29-68	—	44-09	ᄌ+ᅩ+ᆮ
졸	U+C878	33-25	—	28-34	25-58	ᄌ+ᅩ+ᆯ
졺	U+C87A	33-26	—	28-35	25-59	ᄌ+ᅩ+ᆱ
좀	U+C880	33-27	—	28-36	25-60	ᄌ+ᅩ+ᆷ
좁	U+C881	33-28	—	28-37	25-61	ᄌ+ᅩ+ᆸ
좃	U+C883	33-29	—	28-38	25-62	ᄌ+ᅩ+ᆺ
종	U+C885	33-30	—	28-39	25-63	ᄌ+ᅩ+ᆼ
좆	U+C886	33-31	—	28-40	25-64	ᄌ+ᅩ+ᆽ
좇	U+C887	33-32	—	28-41	25-65	ᄌ+ᅩ+ᆾ
좋	U+C88B	33-33	—	28-42	25-66	ᄌ+ᅩ+ᇂ
좌	U+C88C	33-34	—	29-33	26-32	ᄌ+ᅪ+∅
좍	U+C88D	33-35	—	29-34	26-33	ᄌ+ᅪ+ᆨ
좐	U+C890	—	29-69	29-35	26-34	ᄌ+ᅪ+ᆫ
좒	U+C892	—	29-70	—	44-59	ᄌ+ᅪ+ᆭ
좓	U+C893	—	29-71	—	44-60	ᄌ+ᅪ+ᆮ
좔	U+C894	33-36	—	29-36	26-35	ᄌ+ᅪ+ᆯ
좕	U+C895	—	29-72	—	44-61	ᄌ+ᅪ+ᆰ
좜	U+C89C	—	29-73	—	44-62	ᄌ+ᅪ+ᆷ
좝	U+C89D	33-37	—	29-37	44-63	ᄌ+ᅪ+ᆸ
좟	U+C89F	33-38	—	29-38	44-64	ᄌ+ᅪ+ᆺ
좠	U+C8A0	—	29-74	—	—	ᄌ+ᅪ+ᆻ
좡	U+C8A1	33-39	—	29-39	44-65	ᄌ+ᅪ+ᆼ
좨	U+C8A8	33-40	—	29-42	26-38	ᄌ+ᅫ+∅
좩	U+C8A9	—	29-75	—	44-69	ᄌ+ᅫ+ᆨ
좬	U+C8AC	—	29-76	—	—	ᄌ+ᅫ+ᆫ
좯	U+C8AF	—	29-77	—	44-70	ᄌ+ᅫ+ᆮ
좰	U+C8B0	—	29-78	—	—	ᄌ+ᅫ+ᆯ
좸	U+C8B8	—	29-79	—	—	ᄌ+ᅫ+ᆷ
좻	U+C8BB	—	29-80	—	44-71	ᄌ+ᅫ+ᆺ
좼	U+C8BC	33-41	—	29-44	26-40	ᄌ+ᅫ+ᆻ
좽	U+C8BD	33-42	—	29-43	26-39	ᄌ+ᅫ+ᆼ
죄	U+C8C4	33-43	—	29-16	26-21	ᄌ+ᅬ+∅
죅	U+C8C5	—	29-81	—	—	ᄌ+ᅬ+ᆨ
죈	U+C8C8	33-44	—	29-17	26-22	ᄌ+ᅬ+ᆫ
죋	U+C8CB	—	29-82	—	44-49	ᄌ+ᅬ+ᆮ
죌	U+C8CC	33-45	—	29-18	26-23	ᄌ+ᅬ+ᆯ
죔	U+C8D4	33-46	—	29-19	26-24	ᄌ+ᅬ+ᆷ
죕	U+C8D5	33-47	—	29-20	26-25	ᄌ+ᅬ+ᆸ
죗	U+C8D7	33-48	—	29-21	44-50	ᄌ+ᅬ+ᆺ
죘	U+C8D8	—	29-83	29-23	26-26	ᄌ+ᅬ+ᆻ
죙	U+C8D9	33-49	—	29-22	44-51	ᄌ+ᅬ+ᆼ
죠	U+C8E0	33-50	—	28-43	25-67	ᄌ+ᅭ+∅
죡	U+C8E1	33-51	—	28-44	44-10	ᄌ+ᅭ+ᆨ
죤	U+C8E4	33-52	—	28-45	25-68	ᄌ+ᅭ+ᆫ
죧	U+C8E7	—	29-84	—	—	ᄌ+ᅭ+ᆮ
죨	U+C8E8	—	29-85	28-46	44-11	ᄌ+ᅭ+ᆯ
죰	U+C8F0	—	29-86	28-47	44-12	ᄌ+ᅭ+ᆷ
죱	U+C8F1	—	29-87	—	—	ᄌ+ᅭ+ᆸ
죳	U+C8F3	—	29-88	—	—	ᄌ+ᅭ+ᆺ
죵	U+C8F5	33-53	—	28-48	44-13	ᄌ+ᅭ+ᆼ
죻	U+C8FB	—	29-89	—	44-14	ᄌ+ᅭ+ᇂ
주	U+C8FC	33-54	—	28-49	25-69	ᄌ+ᅮ+∅
죽	U+C8FD	33-55	—	28-50	25-70	ᄌ+ᅮ+ᆨ
준	U+C900	33-56	—	28-51	25-71	ᄌ+ᅮ+ᆫ
줃	U+C903	—	29-90	—	44-15	ᄌ+ᅮ+ᆮ
줄	U+C904	33-57	—	28-52	25-72	ᄌ+ᅮ+ᆯ
줅	U+C905	33-58	—	28-53	44-16	ᄌ+ᅮ+ᆰ
줆	U+C906	33-59	—	28-54	25-73	ᄌ+ᅮ+ᆱ
줈	U+C908	—	29-91	—	44-17	ᄌ+ᅮ+ᆳ
줌	U+C90C	33-60	—	28-55	25-74	ᄌ+ᅮ+ᆷ
줍	U+C90D	33-61	—	28-56	25-75	ᄌ+ᅮ+ᆸ
줏	U+C90F	33-62	—	28-57	25-76	ᄌ+ᅮ+ᆺ
중	U+C911	33-63	—	28-58	25-77	ᄌ+ᅮ+ᆼ
줗	U+C917	—	29-92	—	44-18	ᄌ+ᅮ+ᇂ
줘	U+C918	33-64	—	29-40	26-36	ᄌ+ᅯ+∅
줙	U+C919	—	29-93	—	—	ᄌ+ᅯ+ᆨ
줜	U+C91C	—	29-94	—	—	ᄌ+ᅯ+ᆫ
줟	U+C91F	—	30-01	—	44-66	ᄌ+ᅯ+ᆮ
줠	U+C920	—	30-02	—	44-67	ᄌ+ᅯ+ᆯ
줨	U+C928	—	30-03	—	—	ᄌ+ᅯ+ᆷ
줩	U+C929	—	30-04	—	—	ᄌ+ᅯ+ᆸ
줫	U+C92B	—	30-05	—	44-68	ᄌ+ᅯ+ᆺ
줬	U+C92C	33-65	—	29-41	26-37	ᄌ+ᅯ+ᆻ
줭	U+C92D	—	30-06	—	—	ᄌ+ᅯ+ᆼ
줴	U+C934	33-66	—	29-45	26-41	ᄌ+ᅰ+∅
줵	U+C935	—	30-07	—	—	ᄌ+ᅰ+ᆨ
줸	U+C938	—	30-08	29-46	44-72	ᄌ+ᅰ+ᆫ
줻	U+C93B	—	30-09	—	44-73	ᄌ+ᅰ+ᆮ
줼	U+C93C	—	30-10	29-47	44-74	ᄌ+ᅰ+ᆯ
쥄	U+C944	—	30-11	29-48	44-75	ᄌ+ᅰ+ᆷ
쥅	U+C945	—	30-12	29-49	44-76	ᄌ+ᅰ+ᆸ
쥇	U+C947	—	30-13	—	44-77	ᄌ+ᅰ+ᆺ
쥈	U+C948	—	30-14	29-50	26-42	ᄌ+ᅰ+ᆻ
쥉	U+C949	—	30-15	—	44-78	ᄌ+ᅰ+ᆼ
쥐	U+C950	33-67	—	29-24	26-27	ᄌ+ᅱ+∅
쥑	U+C951	33-68	—	29-25	44-52	ᄌ+ᅱ+ᆨ
쥔	U+C954	33-69	—	29-26	26-28	ᄌ+ᅱ+ᆫ
쥗	U+C957	—	30-16	29-27	—	ᄌ+ᅱ+ᆮ
쥘	U+C958	33-70	—	29-28	26-29	ᄌ+ᅱ+ᆯ
쥠	U+C960	33-71	—	29-29	26-30	ᄌ+ᅱ+ᆷ
쥡	U+C961	33-72	—	29-30	26-31	ᄌ+ᅱ+ᆸ
쥣	U+C963	33-73	—	29-31	—	ᄌ+ᅱ+ᆺ
쥥	U+C965	—	30-17	—	44-53	ᄌ+ᅱ+ᆼ
쥬	U+C96C	33-74	—	28-59	25-78	ᄌ+ᅲ+∅
쥭	U+C96D	—	30-18	—	44-19	ᄌ+ᅲ+ᆨ
쥰	U+C970	33-75	—	28-60	44-20	ᄌ+ᅲ+ᆫ
쥴	U+C974	33-76	—	28-61	25-79	ᄌ+ᅲ+ᆯ
쥼	U+C97C	33-77	—	28-62	25-80	ᄌ+ᅲ+ᆷ
쥽	U+C97D	—	30-19	—	—	ᄌ+ᅲ+ᆸ
쥿	U+C97F	—	30-20	—	—	ᄌ+ᅲ+ᆺ
즁	U+C981	—	30-21	28-63	44-21	ᄌ+ᅲ+ᆼ
즈	U+C988	33-78	—	28-64	25-81	ᄌ+ᅳ+∅
즉	U+C989	33-79	—	28-65	25-82	ᄌ+ᅳ+ᆨ
즌	U+C98C	33-80	—	28-66	44-22	ᄌ+ᅳ+ᆫ
즏	U+C98F	—	30-22	—	44-23	ᄌ+ᅳ+ᆮ
즐	U+C990	33-81	—	28-67	25-83	ᄌ+ᅳ+ᆯ
즑	U+C991	—	30-23	—	44-24	ᄌ+ᅳ+ᆰ
즒	U+C992	—	30-24	—	44-25	ᄌ+ᅳ+ᆱ
즔	U+C994	—	30-25	—	44-26	ᄌ+ᅳ+ᆳ
즘	U+C998	33-82	—	28-68	25-84	ᄌ+ᅳ+ᆷ
즙	U+C999	33-83	—	28-69	25-85	ᄌ+ᅳ+ᆸ
즛	U+C99B	33-84	—	28-70	44-27	ᄌ+ᅳ+ᆺ
증	U+C99D	33-85	—	28-71	25-86	ᄌ+ᅳ+ᆼ
즞	U+C99E	—	30-26	—	44-28	ᄌ+ᅳ+ᆽ
즤	U+C9A4	—	30-27	29-32	44-54	ᄌ+ᅴ+∅
즥	U+C9A5	—	30-28	—	44-55	ᄌ+ᅴ+ᆨ
즨	U+C9A8	—	30-29	—	—	ᄌ+ᅴ+ᆫ
즬	U+C9AC	—	30-30	—	44-56	ᄌ+ᅴ+ᆯ
즴	U+C9B4	—	30-31	—	—	ᄌ+ᅴ+ᆷ
즵	U+C9B5	—	30-32	—	—	ᄌ+ᅴ+ᆸ
즷	U+C9B7	—	30-33	—	44-57	ᄌ+ᅴ+ᆺ
즹	U+C9B9	—	30-34	—	44-58	ᄌ+ᅴ+ᆼ
지	U+C9C0	33-86	—	28-72	25-87	ᄌ+ᅵ+∅
직	U+C9C1	33-87	—	28-73	25-88	ᄌ+ᅵ+ᆨ
진	U+C9C4	33-88	—	28-74	25-89	ᄌ+ᅵ+ᆫ
짇	U+C9C7	33-89	—	28-75	44-29	ᄌ+ᅵ+ᆮ
질	U+C9C8	33-90	—	28-76	25-90	ᄌ+ᅵ+ᆯ
짊	U+C9CA	33-91	—	28-77	25-91	ᄌ+ᅵ+ᆱ
짏	U+C9CF	—	30-35	—	—	ᄌ+ᅵ+ᆶ
짐	U+C9D0	33-92	—	28-78	25-92	ᄌ+ᅵ+ᆷ
집	U+C9D1	33-93	—	28-79	25-93	ᄌ+ᅵ+ᆸ
짒	U+C9D2	—	30-36	—	44-30	ᄌ+ᅵ+ᆹ
짓	U+C9D3	33-94	—	28-80	25-94	ᄌ+ᅵ+ᆺ
짔	U+C9D4	—	30-37	—	—	ᄌ+ᅵ+ᆻ
징	U+C9D5	34-01	—	28-81	26-01	ᄌ+ᅵ+ᆼ
짖	U+C9D6	34-02	—	28-82	26-02	ᄌ+ᅵ+ᆽ
짗	U+C9D7	—	30-38	—	44-31	ᄌ+ᅵ+ᆾ
짙	U+C9D9	34-03	—	28-83	26-03	ᄌ+ᅵ+ᇀ
짚	U+C9DA	34-04	—	28-84	26-04	ᄌ+ᅵ+ᇁ
짛	U+C9DB	—	30-39	—	44-32	ᄌ+ᅵ+ᇂ
짜	U+C9DC	34-05	—	40-90	34-91	ᄍ+ᅡ+∅
짝	U+C9DD	34-06	—	40-91	34-92	ᄍ+ᅡ+ᆨ
짞	U+C9DE	—	30-40	—	50-89	ᄍ+ᅡ+ᆩ
짠	U+C9E0	34-07	—	40-92	34-93	ᄍ+ᅡ+ᆫ
짢	U+C9E2	34-08	—	40-93	34-94	ᄍ+ᅡ+ᆭ
짣	U+C9E3	—	30-41	—	50-88	ᄍ+ᅡ+ᆮ
짤	U+C9E4	34-09	—	40-94	35-01	ᄍ+ᅡ+ᆯ
짧	U+C9E7	34-10	—	41-01	35-02	ᄍ+ᅡ+ᆲ
짨	U+C9E8	—	30-42	—	—	ᄍ+ᅡ+ᆳ
짬	U+C9EC	34-11	—	41-02	35-03	ᄍ+ᅡ+ᆷ
짭	U+C9ED	34-12	—	41-03	35-04	ᄍ+ᅡ+ᆸ
짯	U+C9EF	34-13	—	41-04	35-05	ᄍ+ᅡ+ᆺ
짰	U+C9F0	34-14	—	41-06	35-07	ᄍ+ᅡ+ᆻ
짱	U+C9F1	34-15	—	41-05	35-06	ᄍ+ᅡ+ᆼ
짷	U+C9F7	—	30-43	—	—	ᄍ+ᅡ+ᇂ
째	U+C9F8	34-16	—	41-67	35-55	ᄍ+ᅢ+∅
짹	U+C9F9	34-17	—	41-68	35-56	ᄍ+ᅢ+ᆨ
짼	U+C9FC	34-18	—	41-69	35-57	ᄍ+ᅢ+ᆫ
짿	U+C9FF	—	30-44	—	51-27	ᄍ+ᅢ+ᆮ
쨀	U+CA00	34-19	—	41-70	35-58	ᄍ+ᅢ+ᆯ
쨈	U+CA08	34-20	—	41-71	35-59	ᄍ+ᅢ+ᆷ
쨉	U+CA09	34-21	—	41-72	35-60	ᄍ+ᅢ+ᆸ
쨋	U+CA0B	34-22	—	41-73	35-61	ᄍ+ᅢ+ᆺ
쨌	U+CA0C	34-23	—	41-75	35-63	ᄍ+ᅢ+ᆻ
쨍	U+CA0D	34-24	—	41-74	35-62	ᄍ+ᅢ+ᆼ
쨔	U+CA14	34-25	—	41-07	35-08	ᄍ+ᅣ+∅
쨕	U+CA15	—	30-45	—	50-90	ᄍ+ᅣ+ᆨ
쨘	U+CA18	34-26	—	41-08	50-91	ᄍ+ᅣ+ᆫ
쨚	U+CA1A	—	30-46	—	—	ᄍ+ᅣ+ᆭ
쨜	U+CA1C	—	30-47	—	—	ᄍ+ᅣ+ᆯ
쨤	U+CA24	—	30-48	41-09	35-09	ᄍ+ᅣ+ᆷ
쨥	U+CA25	—	30-49	—	50-92	ᄍ+ᅣ+ᆸ
쨧	U+CA27	—	30-50	—	—	ᄍ+ᅣ+ᆺ
쨩	U+CA29	34-27	—	41-10	50-93	ᄍ+ᅣ+ᆼ
쨭	U+CA2D	—	30-51	—	50-94	ᄍ+ᅣ+ᇀ
쨰	U+CA30	—	30-52	41-76	—	ᄍ+ᅤ+∅
쨴	U+CA34	—	—	41-77	—	ᄍ+ᅤ+ᆫ
쩌	U+CA4C	34-28	—	41-11	35-10	ᄍ+ᅥ+∅
쩍	U+CA4D	34-29	—	41-12	35-11	ᄍ+ᅥ+ᆨ
쩐	U+CA50	34-30	—	41-13	35-12	ᄍ+ᅥ+ᆫ
쩓	U+CA53	—	30-53	—	51-01	ᄍ+ᅥ+ᆮ
쩔	U+CA54	34-31	—	41-14	35-13	ᄍ+ᅥ+ᆯ
쩗	U+CA57	—	30-54	41-15	51-02	ᄍ+ᅥ+ᆲ
쩘	U+CA58	—	30-55	—	—	ᄍ+ᅥ+ᆳ
쩛	U+CA5B	—	30-56	—	—	ᄍ+ᅥ+ᆶ
쩜	U+CA5C	34-32	—	41-16	35-14	ᄍ+ᅥ+ᆷ
쩝	U+CA5D	34-33	—	41-17	35-15	ᄍ+ᅥ+ᆸ
쩟	U+CA5F	34-34	—	41-18	35-16	ᄍ+ᅥ+ᆺ
쩠	U+CA60	34-35	—	41-20	—	ᄍ+ᅥ+ᆻ
쩡	U+CA61	34-36	—	41-19	35-17	ᄍ+ᅥ+ᆼ
쩧	U+CA67	—	30-57	—	51-03	ᄍ+ᅥ+ᇂ
쩨	U+CA68	34-37	—	41-78	35-64	ᄍ+ᅦ+∅
쩩	U+CA69	—	30-58	41-79	51-28	ᄍ+ᅦ+ᆨ
쩬	U+CA6C	—	30-59	41-80	35-65	ᄍ+ᅦ+ᆫ
쩯	U+CA6F	—	30-60	—	51-29	ᄍ+ᅦ+ᆮ
쩰	U+CA70	—	30-61	41-81	35-66	ᄍ+ᅦ+ᆯ
쩸	U+CA78	—	30-62	41-82	51-30	ᄍ+ᅦ+ᆷ
쩹	U+CA79	—	30-63	41-83	51-31	ᄍ+ᅦ+ᆸ
쩻	U+CA7B	—	30-64	—	51-32	ᄍ+ᅦ+ᆺ
쩼	U+CA7C	—	30-65	—	—	ᄍ+ᅦ+ᆻ
쩽	U+CA7D	34-38	—	41-84	35-67	ᄍ+ᅦ+ᆼ
쪁	U+CA81	—	30-66	—	—	ᄍ+ᅦ+ᇀ
쪄	U+CA84	34-39	—	41-21	35-18	ᄍ+ᅧ+∅
쪅	U+CA85	—	30-67	—	51-04	ᄍ+ᅧ+ᆨ
쪈	U+CA88	—	30-68	—	51-05	ᄍ+ᅧ+ᆫ
쪋	U+CA8B	—	30-69	—	—	ᄍ+ᅧ+ᆮ
쪌	U+CA8C	—	30-70	—	51-06	ᄍ+ᅧ+ᆯ
쪔	U+CA94	—	30-71	—	51-07	ᄍ+ᅧ+ᆷ
쪕	U+CA95	—	30-72	—	51-08	ᄍ+ᅧ+ᆸ
쪗	U+CA97	—	30-73	—	—	ᄍ+ᅧ+ᆺ
쪘	U+CA98	34-40	—	41-22	35-19	ᄍ+ᅧ+ᆻ
쪙	U+CA99	—	30-74	—	51-09	ᄍ+ᅧ+ᆼ
쪠	U+CAA0	—	30-75	41-85	—	ᄍ+ᅨ+∅
쪡	U+CAA1	—	30-76	—	—	ᄍ+ᅨ+ᆨ
쪤	U+CAA4	—	30-77	—	51-33	ᄍ+ᅨ+ᆫ
쪨	U+CAA8	—	30-78	—	—	ᄍ+ᅨ+ᆯ
쪰	U+CAB0	—	30-79	—	—	ᄍ+ᅨ+ᆷ
쪱	U+CAB1	—	30-80	—	—	ᄍ+ᅨ+ᆸ
쪳	U+CAB3	—	30-81	—	—	ᄍ+ᅨ+ᆺ
쪵	U+CAB5	—	30-82	—	51-34	ᄍ+ᅨ+ᆼ
쪼	U+CABC	34-41	—	41-23	35-20	ᄍ+ᅩ+∅
쪽	U+CABD	34-42	—	41-24	35-21	ᄍ+ᅩ+ᆨ
쪾	U+CABE	—	30-83	—	—	ᄍ+ᅩ+ᆩ
쫀	U+CAC0	34-43	—	41-25	35-22	ᄍ+ᅩ+ᆫ
쫃	U+CAC3	—	30-84	—	51-10	ᄍ+ᅩ+ᆮ
쫄	U+CAC4	34-44	—	41-26	35-23	ᄍ+ᅩ+ᆯ
쫆	U+CAC6	—	30-85	—	51-11	ᄍ+ᅩ+ᆱ
쫌	U+CACC	34-45	—	41-27	35-24	ᄍ+ᅩ+ᆷ
쫍	U+CACD	34-46	—	41-28	35-25	ᄍ+ᅩ+ᆸ
쫏	U+CACF	34-47	—	41-29	35-26	ᄍ+ᅩ+ᆺ
쫑	U+CAD1	34-48	—	41-30	35-27	ᄍ+ᅩ+ᆼ
쫒	U+CAD2	—	30-86	41-31	35-28	ᄍ+ᅩ+ᆽ
쫓	U+CAD3	34-49	—	41-32	35-29	ᄍ+ᅩ+ᆾ
쫗	U+CAD7	—	30-87	41-33	51-12	ᄍ+ᅩ+ᇂ
쫘	U+CAD8	34-50	—	42-01	35-74	ᄍ+ᅪ+∅
쫙	U+CAD9	34-51	—	42-02	35-75	ᄍ+ᅪ+ᆨ
쫜	U+CADC	—	30-88	42-03	51-41	ᄍ+ᅪ+ᆫ
쫟	U+CADF	—	30-89	—	—	ᄍ+ᅪ+ᆮ
쫠	U+CAE0	34-52	—	42-04	35-76	ᄍ+ᅪ+ᆯ
쫨	U+CAE8	—	30-90	—	—	ᄍ+ᅪ+ᆷ
쫩	U+CAE9	—	30-91	—	—	ᄍ+ᅪ+ᆸ
쫫	U+CAEB	—	30-92	—	—	ᄍ+ᅪ+ᆺ
쫬	U+CAEC	34-53	—	42-06	—	ᄍ+ᅪ+ᆻ
쫭	U+CAED	—	30-93	42-05	35-77	ᄍ+ᅪ+ᆼ
쫴	U+CAF4	34-54	—	42-10	51-42	ᄍ+ᅫ+∅
쫵	U+CAF5	—	30-94	—	51-43	ᄍ+ᅫ+ᆨ
쫸	U+CAF8	—	31-01	—	—	ᄍ+ᅫ+ᆫ
쫻	U+CAFB	—	31-02	—	51-44	ᄍ+ᅫ+ᆮ
쫼	U+CAFC	—	31-03	—	—	ᄍ+ᅫ+ᆯ
쬈	U+CB08	34-55	—	42-11	51-45	ᄍ+ᅫ+ᆻ
쬐	U+CB10	34-56	—	41-86	35-68	ᄍ+ᅬ+∅
쬑	U+CB11	—	31-04	—	—	ᄍ+ᅬ+ᆨ
쬔	U+CB14	34-57	—	41-87	35-69	ᄍ+ᅬ+ᆫ
쬗	U+CB17	—	31-05	—	51-35	ᄍ+ᅬ+ᆮ
쬘	U+CB18	34-58	—	41-88	35-70	ᄍ+ᅬ+ᆯ
쬠	U+CB20	34-59	—	41-89	35-71	ᄍ+ᅬ+ᆷ
쬡	U+CB21	34-60	—	41-90	35-72	ᄍ+ᅬ+ᆸ
쬣	U+CB23	—	31-06	—	51-36	ᄍ+ᅬ+ᆺ
쬤	U+CB24	—	31-07	41-91	35-73	ᄍ+ᅬ+ᆻ
쬥	U+CB25	—	31-08	—	51-37	ᄍ+ᅬ+ᆼ
쬧	U+CB27	—	31-09	—	—	ᄍ+ᅬ+ᆾ
쬬	U+CB2C	—	31-10	41-34	35-30	ᄍ+ᅭ+∅
쬭	U+CB2D	—	31-11	—	51-13	ᄍ+ᅭ+ᆨ
쬰	U+CB30	—	31-12	41-35	—	ᄍ+ᅭ+ᆫ
쬴	U+CB34	—	31-13	—	51-14	ᄍ+ᅭ+ᆯ
쬼	U+CB3C	—	31-14	41-36	51-15	ᄍ+ᅭ+ᆷ
쬽	U+CB3D	—	31-15	—	51-16	ᄍ+ᅭ+ᆸ
쬿	U+CB3F	—	31-16	—	—	ᄍ+ᅭ+ᆺ
쭁	U+CB41	34-61	—	41-37	51-17	ᄍ+ᅭ+ᆼ
쭈	U+CB48	34-62	—	41-38	35-31	ᄍ+ᅮ+∅
쭉	U+CB49	34-63	—	41-39	35-32	ᄍ+ᅮ+ᆨ
쭊	U+CB4A	—	31-17	—	—	ᄍ+ᅮ+ᆩ
쭌	U+CB4C	34-64	—	41-40	35-33	ᄍ+ᅮ+ᆫ
쭏	U+CB4F	—	31-18	—	—	ᄍ+ᅮ+ᆮ
쭐	U+CB50	34-65	—	41-41	35-34	ᄍ+ᅮ+ᆯ
쭒	U+CB52	—	31-19	—	51-18	ᄍ+ᅮ+ᆱ
쭘	U+CB58	34-66	—	41-42	35-35	ᄍ+ᅮ+ᆷ
쭙	U+CB59	34-67	—	41-43	35-36	ᄍ+ᅮ+ᆸ
쭛	U+CB5B	—	31-20	41-44	—	ᄍ+ᅮ+ᆺ
쭝	U+CB5D	34-68	—	41-45	35-37	ᄍ+ᅮ+ᆼ
쭤	U+CB64	34-69	—	42-07	35-78	ᄍ+ᅯ+∅
쭥	U+CB65	—	31-21	—	—	ᄍ+ᅯ+ᆨ
쭨	U+CB68	—	31-22	—	—	ᄍ+ᅯ+ᆫ
쭫	U+CB6B	—	31-23	—	—	ᄍ+ᅯ+ᆮ
쭬	U+CB6C	—	31-24	—	—	ᄍ+ᅯ+ᆯ
쭴	U+CB74	—	31-25	—	—	ᄍ+ᅯ+ᆷ
쭵	U+CB75	—	31-26	—	—	ᄍ+ᅯ+ᆸ
쭷	U+CB77	—	31-27	—	—	ᄍ+ᅯ+ᆺ
쭸	U+CB78	34-70	—	42-09	—	ᄍ+ᅯ+ᆻ
쭹	U+CB79	34-71	—	42-08	—	ᄍ+ᅯ+ᆼ
쮀	U+CB80	—	31-28	42-12	51-46	ᄍ+ᅰ+∅
쮁	U+CB81	—	31-29	—	—	ᄍ+ᅰ+ᆨ
쮄	U+CB84	—	31-30	—	51-47	ᄍ+ᅰ+ᆫ
쮇	U+CB87	—	31-31	—	51-48	ᄍ+ᅰ+ᆮ
쮈	U+CB88	—	31-32	—	51-49	ᄍ+ᅰ+ᆯ
쮐	U+CB90	—	31-33	—	51-50	ᄍ+ᅰ+ᆷ
쮑	U+CB91	—	31-34	—	51-51	ᄍ+ᅰ+ᆸ
쮓	U+CB93	—	31-35	—	51-52	ᄍ+ᅰ+ᆺ
쮔	U+CB94	—	—	—	51-53	ᄍ+ᅰ+ᆻ
쮕	U+CB95	—	31-36	—	—	ᄍ+ᅰ+ᆼ
쮜	U+CB9C	34-72	—	41-92	51-38	ᄍ+ᅱ+∅
쮝	U+CB9D	—	31-37	—	—	ᄍ+ᅱ+ᆨ
쮠	U+CBA0	—	31-38	—	—	ᄍ+ᅱ+ᆫ
쮣	U+CBA3	—	31-39	—	—	ᄍ+ᅱ+ᆮ
쮤	U+CBA4	—	31-40	—	—	ᄍ+ᅱ+ᆯ
쮬	U+CBAC	—	31-41	—	—	ᄍ+ᅱ+ᆷ
쮭	U+CBAD	—	31-42	—	—	ᄍ+ᅱ+ᆸ
쮯	U+CBAF	—	31-43	—	—	ᄍ+ᅱ+ᆺ
쮱	U+CBB1	—	31-44	—	—	ᄍ+ᅱ+ᆼ
쮸	U+CBB8	34-73	—	41-46	35-38	ᄍ+ᅲ+∅
쮹	U+CBB9	—	31-45	—	—	ᄍ+ᅲ+ᆨ
쮼	U+CBBC	—	31-46	—	35-39	ᄍ+ᅲ+ᆫ
쯀	U+CBC0	—	31-47	41-47	51-19	ᄍ+ᅲ+ᆯ
쯈	U+CBC8	—	31-48	—	—	ᄍ+ᅲ+ᆷ
쯉	U+CBC9	—	31-49	—	—	ᄍ+ᅲ+ᆸ
쯋	U+CBCB	—	31-50	—	—	ᄍ+ᅲ+ᆺ
쯍	U+CBCD	—	31-51	—	51-20	ᄍ+ᅲ+ᆼ
쯔	U+CBD4	34-74	—	41-48	35-40	ᄍ+ᅳ+∅
쯕	U+CBD5	—	31-52	41-49	51-21	ᄍ+ᅳ+ᆨ
쯘	U+CBD8	—	31-53	41-50	35-41	ᄍ+ᅳ+ᆫ
쯛	U+CBDB	—	31-54	—	51-22	ᄍ+ᅳ+ᆮ
쯜	U+CBDC	—	31-55	41-51	51-23	ᄍ+ᅳ+ᆯ
쯤	U+CBE4	34-75	—	41-52	35-42	ᄍ+ᅳ+ᆷ
쯥	U+CBE5	—	31-56	—	51-24	ᄍ+ᅳ+ᆸ
쯧	U+CBE7	34-76	—	41-53	35-43	ᄍ+ᅳ+ᆺ
쯩	U+CBE9	34-77	—	41-54	51-25	ᄍ+ᅳ+ᆼ
쯪	U+CBEA	—	31-57	41-55	—	ᄍ+ᅳ+ᆽ
쯰	U+CBF0	—	31-58	41-93	51-39	ᄍ+ᅴ+∅
쯱	U+CBF1	—	31-59	—	—	ᄍ+ᅴ+ᆨ
쯴	U+CBF4	—	31-60	41-94	—	ᄍ+ᅴ+ᆫ
쯸	U+CBF8	—	31-61	—	—	ᄍ+ᅴ+ᆯ
찀	U+CC00	—	31-62	—	—	ᄍ+ᅴ+ᆷ
찁	U+CC01	—	31-63	—	—	ᄍ+ᅴ+ᆸ
찃	U+CC03	—	31-64	—	—	ᄍ+ᅴ+ᆺ
찅	U+CC05	—	31-65	—	—	ᄍ+ᅴ+ᆼ
찆	U+CC06	—	31-66	—	51-40	ᄍ+ᅴ+ᆽ
찌	U+CC0C	34-78	—	41-56	35-44	ᄍ+ᅵ+∅
찍	U+CC0D	34-79	—	41-57	35-45	ᄍ+ᅵ+ᆨ
찐	U+CC10	34-80	—	41-58	35-46	ᄍ+ᅵ+ᆫ
찓	U+CC13	—	31-67	—	51-26	ᄍ+ᅵ+ᆮ
찔	U+CC14	34-81	—	41-59	35-47	ᄍ+ᅵ+ᆯ
찜	U+CC1C	34-82	—	41-60	35-48	ᄍ+ᅵ+ᆷ
찝	U+CC1D	34-83	—	41-61	35-49	ᄍ+ᅵ+ᆸ
찟	U+CC1F	—	31-68	41-62	35-50	ᄍ+ᅵ+ᆺ
찡	U+CC21	34-84	—	41-63	35-51	ᄍ+ᅵ+ᆼ
찢	U+CC22	34-85	—	41-64	35-52	ᄍ+ᅵ+ᆽ
찦	U+CC26	—	31-69	41-65	35-53	ᄍ+ᅵ+ᇁ
찧	U+CC27	34-86	—	41-66	35-54	ᄍ+ᅵ+ᇂ
차	U+CC28	34-87	—	29-51	26-44	ᄎ+ᅡ+∅
착	U+CC29	34-88	—	29-52	26-45	ᄎ+ᅡ+ᆨ
찬	U+CC2C	34-89	—	29-53	26-46	ᄎ+ᅡ+ᆫ
찮	U+CC2E	34-90	—	29-54	26-47	ᄎ+ᅡ+ᆭ
찯	U+CC2F	—	31-70	—	44-79	ᄎ+ᅡ+ᆮ
찰	U+CC30	34-91	—	29-55	26-48	ᄎ+ᅡ+ᆯ
찱	U+CC31	—	31-71	—	44-80	ᄎ+ᅡ+ᆰ
참	U+CC38	34-92	—	29-56	26-49	ᄎ+ᅡ+ᆷ
찹	U+CC39	34-93	—	29-57	26-50	ᄎ+ᅡ+ᆸ
찻	U+CC3B	34-94	—	29-58	26-51	ᄎ+ᅡ+ᆺ
찼	U+CC3C	35-01	—	29-61	26-54	ᄎ+ᅡ+ᆻ
창	U+CC3D	35-02	—	29-59	26-52	ᄎ+ᅡ+ᆼ
찾	U+CC3E	35-03	—	29-60	26-53	ᄎ+ᅡ+ᆽ
찿	U+CC3F	—	31-72	—	—	ᄎ+ᅡ+ᆾ
챂	U+CC42	—	31-73	—	—	ᄎ+ᅡ+ᇁ
채	U+CC44	35-04	—	30-33	27-07	ᄎ+ᅢ+∅
책	U+CC45	35-05	—	30-34	27-08	ᄎ+ᅢ+ᆨ
챈	U+CC48	35-06	—	30-35	27-09	ᄎ+ᅢ+ᆫ
챋	U+CC4B	—	31-74	—	45-21	ᄎ+ᅢ+ᆮ
챌	U+CC4C	35-07	—	30-36	27-10	ᄎ+ᅢ+ᆯ
챔	U+CC54	35-08	—	30-37	27-11	ᄎ+ᅢ+ᆷ
챕	U+CC55	35-09	—	30-38	27-12	ᄎ+ᅢ+ᆸ
챗	U+CC57	35-10	—	30-39	27-13	ᄎ+ᅢ+ᆺ
챘	U+CC58	35-11	—	30-41	27-15	ᄎ+ᅢ+ᆻ
챙	U+CC59	35-12	—	30-40	27-14	ᄎ+ᅢ+ᆼ
챛	U+CC5B	—	31-75	—	—	ᄎ+ᅢ+ᆾ
챞	U+CC5E	—	31-76	—	—	ᄎ+ᅢ+ᇁ
챠	U+CC60	35-13	—	29-62	26-55	ᄎ+ᅣ+∅
챡	U+CC61	—	31-77	—	44-81	ᄎ+ᅣ+ᆨ
챤	U+CC64	35-14	—	29-63	26-56	ᄎ+ᅣ+ᆫ
챦	U+CC66	35-15	—	29-64	—	ᄎ+ᅣ+ᆭ
챨	U+CC68	35-16	—	29-65	26-57	ᄎ+ᅣ+ᆯ
챰	U+CC70	35-17	—	29-66	26-58	ᄎ+ᅣ+ᆷ
챱	U+CC71	—	31-78	29-67	44-82	ᄎ+ᅣ+ᆸ
챳	U+CC73	—	31-79	—	—	ᄎ+ᅣ+ᆺ
챵	U+CC75	35-18	—	29-68	44-83	ᄎ+ᅣ+ᆼ
챺	U+CC7A	—	31-80	—	—	ᄎ+ᅣ+ᇁ
챼	U+CC7C	—	31-81	30-42	—	ᄎ+ᅤ+∅
첑	U+CC91	—	31-82	—	—	ᄎ+ᅤ+ᆼ
처	U+CC98	35-19	—	29-69	26-59	ᄎ+ᅥ+∅
척	U+CC99	35-20	—	29-70	26-60	ᄎ+ᅥ+ᆨ
천	U+CC9C	35-21	—	29-71	26-61	ᄎ+ᅥ+ᆫ
첟	U+CC9F	—	31-83	—	44-84	ᄎ+ᅥ+ᆮ
철	U+CCA0	35-22	—	29-72	26-62	ᄎ+ᅥ+ᆯ
첧	U+CCA7	—	31-84	—	—	ᄎ+ᅥ+ᆶ
첨	U+CCA8	35-23	—	29-73	26-63	ᄎ+ᅥ+ᆷ
첩	U+CCA9	35-24	—	29-74	26-64	ᄎ+ᅥ+ᆸ
첫	U+CCAB	35-25	—	29-75	26-65	ᄎ+ᅥ+ᆺ
첬	U+CCAC	35-26	—	29-77	44-85	ᄎ+ᅥ+ᆻ
청	U+CCAD	35-27	—	29-76	26-66	ᄎ+ᅥ+ᆼ
첮	U+CCAE	—	31-85	—	—	ᄎ+ᅥ+ᆽ
첲	U+CCB2	—	31-86	—	—	ᄎ+ᅥ+ᇁ
체	U+CCB4	35-28	—	30-43	27-16	ᄎ+ᅦ+∅
첵	U+CCB5	35-29	—	30-44	45-22	ᄎ+ᅦ+ᆨ
첸	U+CCB8	35-30	—	30-45	27-17	ᄎ+ᅦ+ᆫ
첻	U+CCBB	—	31-87	—	45-23	ᄎ+ᅦ+ᆮ
첼	U+CCBC	35-31	—	30-46	27-18	ᄎ+ᅦ+ᆯ
쳃	U+CCC3	—	31-88	—	—	ᄎ+ᅦ+ᆶ
쳄	U+CCC4	35-32	—	30-47	45-24	ᄎ+ᅦ+ᆷ
쳅	U+CCC5	35-33	—	30-48	45-25	ᄎ+ᅦ+ᆸ
쳇	U+CCC7	35-34	—	30-49	27-19	ᄎ+ᅦ+ᆺ
쳈	U+CCC8	—	31-89	30-51	45-26	ᄎ+ᅦ+ᆻ
쳉	U+CCC9	35-35	—	30-50	27-20	ᄎ+ᅦ+ᆼ
쳐	U+CCD0	35-36	—	29-78	26-67	ᄎ+ᅧ+∅
쳑	U+CCD1	—	31-90	29-79	44-86	ᄎ+ᅧ+ᆨ
쳔	U+CCD4	35-37	—	29-80	44-87	ᄎ+ᅧ+ᆫ
쳗	U+CCD7	—	31-91	—	44-88	ᄎ+ᅧ+ᆮ
쳘	U+CCD8	—	31-92	29-81	44-89	ᄎ+ᅧ+ᆯ
쳠	U+CCE0	—	31-93	—	44-90	ᄎ+ᅧ+ᆷ
쳡	U+CCE1	—	31-94	—	44-91	ᄎ+ᅧ+ᆸ
쳣	U+CCE3	—	32-01	—	44-92	ᄎ+ᅧ+ᆺ
쳤	U+CCE4	35-38	—	29-82	26-68	ᄎ+ᅧ+ᆻ
쳥	U+CCE5	—	32-02	—	44-93	ᄎ+ᅧ+ᆼ
쳬	U+CCEC	35-39	—	30-52	45-27	ᄎ+ᅨ+∅
쳭	U+CCED	—	32-03	—	—	ᄎ+ᅨ+ᆨ
쳰	U+CCF0	35-40	—	30-53	45-28	ᄎ+ᅨ+ᆫ
쳴	U+CCF4	—	32-04	—	—	ᄎ+ᅨ+ᆯ
쳼	U+CCFC	—	32-05	—	—	ᄎ+ᅨ+ᆷ
쳽	U+CCFD	—	32-06	—	—	ᄎ+ᅨ+ᆸ
쳿	U+CCFF	—	32-07	—	45-29	ᄎ+ᅨ+ᆺ
촁	U+CD01	35-41	—	30-54	45-30	ᄎ+ᅨ+ᆼ
초	U+CD08	35-42	—	29-83	26-69	ᄎ+ᅩ+∅
촉	U+CD09	35-43	—	29-84	26-70	ᄎ+ᅩ+ᆨ
촌	U+CD0C	35-44	—	29-85	26-71	ᄎ+ᅩ+ᆫ
촏	U+CD0F	—	32-08	—	44-94	ᄎ+ᅩ+ᆮ
촐	U+CD10	35-45	—	29-86	26-72	ᄎ+ᅩ+ᆯ
촘	U+CD18	35-46	—	29-87	26-73	ᄎ+ᅩ+ᆷ
촙	U+CD19	35-47	—	29-88	26-74	ᄎ+ᅩ+ᆸ
촛	U+CD1B	35-48	—	29-89	26-75	ᄎ+ᅩ+ᆺ
총	U+CD1D	35-49	—	29-90	26-76	ᄎ+ᅩ+ᆼ
촤	U+CD24	35-50	—	30-70	45-49	ᄎ+ᅪ+∅
촥	U+CD25	—	32-09	30-71	—	ᄎ+ᅪ+ᆨ
촨	U+CD28	35-51	—	30-72	45-50	ᄎ+ᅪ+ᆫ
촫	U+CD2B	—	32-10	—	—	ᄎ+ᅪ+ᆮ
촬	U+CD2C	35-52	—	30-73	27-23	ᄎ+ᅪ+ᆯ
촴	U+CD34	—	32-11	—	—	ᄎ+ᅪ+ᆷ
촵	U+CD35	—	32-12	—	—	ᄎ+ᅪ+ᆸ
촷	U+CD37	—	32-13	—	—	ᄎ+ᅪ+ᆺ
촹	U+CD39	35-53	—	30-74	45-51	ᄎ+ᅪ+ᆼ
쵀	U+CD40	—	32-14	30-78	45-53	ᄎ+ᅫ+∅
쵄	U+CD44	—	—	30-79	—	ᄎ+ᅫ+ᆫ
쵓	U+CD53	—	32-15	—	—	ᄎ+ᅫ+ᆺ
쵔	U+CD54	—	32-16	—	—	ᄎ+ᅫ+ᆻ
최	U+CD5C	35-54	—	30-55	27-21	ᄎ+ᅬ+∅
쵝	U+CD5D	—	32-17	—	—	ᄎ+ᅬ+ᆨ
쵠	U+CD60	35-55	—	30-56	45-31	ᄎ+ᅬ+ᆫ
쵣	U+CD63	—	32-18	—	45-32	ᄎ+ᅬ+ᆮ
쵤	U+CD64	35-56	—	30-57	45-33	ᄎ+ᅬ+ᆯ
쵬	U+CD6C	35-57	—	30-58	—	ᄎ+ᅬ+ᆷ
쵭	U+CD6D	35-58	—	30-59	—	ᄎ+ᅬ+ᆸ
쵯	U+CD6F	35-59	—	30-60	—	ᄎ+ᅬ+ᆺ
쵰	U+CD70	—	32-19	—	45-35	ᄎ+ᅬ+ᆻ
쵱	U+CD71	35-60	—	30-61	45-34	ᄎ+ᅬ+ᆼ
쵸	U+CD78	35-61	—	29-91	26-77	ᄎ+ᅭ+∅
쵹	U+CD79	—	32-20	—	45-01	ᄎ+ᅭ+ᆨ
쵼	U+CD7C	—	32-21	29-92	45-02	ᄎ+ᅭ+ᆫ
춀	U+CD80	—	32-22	29-93	45-03	ᄎ+ᅭ+ᆯ
춈	U+CD88	35-62	—	29-94	45-04	ᄎ+ᅭ+ᆷ
춉	U+CD89	—	32-23	—	—	ᄎ+ᅭ+ᆸ
춋	U+CD8B	—	32-24	—	45-05	ᄎ+ᅭ+ᆺ
춍	U+CD8D	—	32-25	—	45-06	ᄎ+ᅭ+ᆼ
추	U+CD94	35-63	—	30-01	26-78	ᄎ+ᅮ+∅
축	U+CD95	35-64	—	30-02	26-79	ᄎ+ᅮ+ᆨ
춘	U+CD98	35-65	—	30-03	26-80	ᄎ+ᅮ+ᆫ
춛	U+CD9B	—	32-26	30-04	45-07	ᄎ+ᅮ+ᆮ
출	U+CD9C	35-66	—	30-05	26-81	ᄎ+ᅮ+ᆯ
춤	U+CDA4	35-67	—	30-06	26-82	ᄎ+ᅮ+ᆷ
춥	U+CDA5	35-68	—	30-07	26-83	ᄎ+ᅮ+ᆸ
춧	U+CDA7	35-69	—	30-08	26-84	ᄎ+ᅮ+ᆺ
충	U+CDA9	35-70	—	30-09	26-85	ᄎ+ᅮ+ᆼ
춰	U+CDB0	35-71	—	30-75	27-24	ᄎ+ᅯ+∅
춱	U+CDB1	—	32-27	—	—	ᄎ+ᅯ+ᆨ
춴	U+CDB4	—	32-28	—	—	ᄎ+ᅯ+ᆫ
춷	U+CDB7	—	32-29	—	45-52	ᄎ+ᅯ+ᆮ
춸	U+CDB8	—	32-30	—	—	ᄎ+ᅯ+ᆯ
췀	U+CDC0	—	32-31	—	—	ᄎ+ᅯ+ᆷ
췁	U+CDC1	—	32-32	—	—	ᄎ+ᅯ+ᆸ
췃	U+CDC3	—	32-33	30-76	—	ᄎ+ᅯ+ᆺ
췄	U+CDC4	35-72	—	30-77	27-25	ᄎ+ᅯ+ᆻ
췅	U+CDC5	—	32-34	—	—	ᄎ+ᅯ+ᆼ
췌	U+CDCC	35-73	—	30-80	27-26	ᄎ+ᅰ+∅
췍	U+CDCD	—	32-35	—	—	ᄎ+ᅰ+ᆨ
췐	U+CDD0	35-74	—	30-81	—	ᄎ+ᅰ+ᆫ
췔	U+CDD4	—	32-36	—	—	ᄎ+ᅰ+ᆯ
췜	U+CDDC	—	32-37	—	—	ᄎ+ᅰ+ᆷ
췝	U+CDDD	—	32-38	—	—	ᄎ+ᅰ+ᆸ
췟	U+CDDF	—	32-39	—	—	ᄎ+ᅰ+ᆺ
췠	U+CDE0	—	32-40	—	45-55	ᄎ+ᅰ+ᆻ
췡	U+CDE1	—	32-41	—	45-54	ᄎ+ᅰ+ᆼ
취	U+CDE8	35-75	—	30-62	27-22	ᄎ+ᅱ+∅
췩	U+CDE9	—	32-42	—	—	ᄎ+ᅱ+ᆨ
췬	U+CDEC	35-76	—	30-63	45-36	ᄎ+ᅱ+ᆫ
췯	U+CDEF	—	32-43	—	45-37	ᄎ+ᅱ+ᆮ
췰	U+CDF0	35-77	—	30-64	45-38	ᄎ+ᅱ+ᆯ
췸	U+CDF8	35-78	—	30-65	45-39	ᄎ+ᅱ+ᆷ
췹	U+CDF9	35-79	—	30-66	45-40	ᄎ+ᅱ+ᆸ
췻	U+CDFB	35-80	—	30-67	45-41	ᄎ+ᅱ+ᆺ
췽	U+CDFD	35-81	—	30-68	45-42	ᄎ+ᅱ+ᆼ
츄	U+CE04	35-82	—	30-10	26-86	ᄎ+ᅲ+∅
츅	U+CE05	—	32-44	—	45-08	ᄎ+ᅲ+ᆨ
츈	U+CE08	35-83	—	30-11	45-09	ᄎ+ᅲ+ᆫ
츌	U+CE0C	35-84	—	30-12	45-10	ᄎ+ᅲ+ᆯ
츔	U+CE14	35-85	—	30-13	26-87	ᄎ+ᅲ+ᆷ
츕	U+CE15	—	32-45	—	—	ᄎ+ᅲ+ᆸ
츗	U+CE17	—	32-46	—	—	ᄎ+ᅲ+ᆺ
츙	U+CE19	35-86	—	30-14	45-11	ᄎ+ᅲ+ᆼ
츠	U+CE20	35-87	—	30-15	26-88	ᄎ+ᅳ+∅
측	U+CE21	35-88	—	30-16	26-89	ᄎ+ᅳ+ᆨ
츤	U+CE24	35-89	—	30-17	45-12	ᄎ+ᅳ+ᆫ
츧	U+CE27	—	32-47	—	45-13	ᄎ+ᅳ+ᆮ
츨	U+CE28	35-90	—	30-18	45-14	ᄎ+ᅳ+ᆯ
츩	U+CE29	—	32-48	—	45-15	ᄎ+ᅳ+ᆰ
츬	U+CE2C	—	32-49	—	45-16	ᄎ+ᅳ+ᆳ
츰	U+CE30	35-91	—	30-19	26-90	ᄎ+ᅳ+ᆷ
츱	U+CE31	35-92	—	30-20	45-17	ᄎ+ᅳ+ᆸ
츳	U+CE33	35-93	—	30-21	45-18	ᄎ+ᅳ+ᆺ
층	U+CE35	35-94	—	30-22	26-91	ᄎ+ᅳ+ᆼ
츼	U+CE3C	—	32-50	30-69	45-43	ᄎ+ᅴ+∅
츽	U+CE3D	—	32-51	—	45-44	ᄎ+ᅴ+ᆨ
칀	U+CE40	—	32-52	—	45-45	ᄎ+ᅴ+ᆫ
칄	U+CE44	—	32-53	—	45-46	ᄎ+ᅴ+ᆯ
칌	U+CE4C	—	32-54	—	—	ᄎ+ᅴ+ᆷ
칍	U+CE4D	—	32-55	—	—	ᄎ+ᅴ+ᆸ
칏	U+CE4F	—	32-56	—	45-47	ᄎ+ᅴ+ᆺ
칑	U+CE51	—	32-57	—	45-48	ᄎ+ᅴ+ᆼ
치	U+CE58	36-01	—	30-23	26-92	ᄎ+ᅵ+∅
칙	U+CE59	36-02	—	30-24	26-93	ᄎ+ᅵ+ᆨ
친	U+CE5C	36-03	—	30-25	26-94	ᄎ+ᅵ+ᆫ
칟	U+CE5F	36-04	—	30-26	45-19	ᄎ+ᅵ+ᆮ
칠	U+CE60	36-05	—	30-27	27-01	ᄎ+ᅵ+ᆯ
칡	U+CE61	36-06	—	30-28	27-02	ᄎ+ᅵ+ᆰ
칢	U+CE62	—	32-58	—	—	ᄎ+ᅵ+ᆱ
침	U+CE68	36-07	—	30-29	27-03	ᄎ+ᅵ+ᆷ
칩	U+CE69	36-08	—	30-30	27-04	ᄎ+ᅵ+ᆸ
칫	U+CE6B	36-09	—	30-31	27-05	ᄎ+ᅵ+ᆺ
칬	U+CE6C	—	32-59	—	—	ᄎ+ᅵ+ᆻ
칭	U+CE6D	36-10	—	30-32	27-06	ᄎ+ᅵ+ᆼ
칮	U+CE6E	—	32-60	—	45-20	ᄎ+ᅵ+ᆽ
칰	U+CE70	—	32-61	—	—	ᄎ+ᅵ+ᆿ
칲	U+CE72	—	32-62	—	—	ᄎ+ᅵ+ᇁ
카	U+CE74	36-11	—	30-82	27-28	ᄏ+ᅡ+∅
칵	U+CE75	36-12	—	30-83	27-29	ᄏ+ᅡ+ᆨ
칸	U+CE78	36-13	—	30-84	27-30	ᄏ+ᅡ+ᆫ
칻	U+CE7B	—	32-63	—	45-56	ᄏ+ᅡ+ᆮ
칼	U+CE7C	36-14	—	30-85	27-31	ᄏ+ᅡ+ᆯ
캄	U+CE84	36-15	—	30-86	27-32	ᄏ+ᅡ+ᆷ
캅	U+CE85	36-16	—	30-87	27-33	ᄏ+ᅡ+ᆸ
캇	U+CE87	36-17	—	30-88	45-57	ᄏ+ᅡ+ᆺ
캈	U+CE88	—	32-64	30-91	—	ᄏ+ᅡ+ᆻ
캉	U+CE89	36-18	—	30-89	27-34	ᄏ+ᅡ+ᆼ
캍	U+CE8D	—	32-65	—	45-58	ᄏ+ᅡ+ᇀ
캎	U+CE8E	—	32-66	30-90	—	ᄏ+ᅡ+ᇁ
캐	U+CE90	36-19	—	31-61	27-84	ᄏ+ᅢ+∅
캑	U+CE91	36-20	—	31-62	27-85	ᄏ+ᅢ+ᆨ
캔	U+CE94	36-21	—	31-63	27-86	ᄏ+ᅢ+ᆫ
캗	U+CE97	—	32-67	—	45-74	ᄏ+ᅢ+ᆮ
캘	U+CE98	36-22	—	31-64	27-87	ᄏ+ᅢ+ᆯ
캠	U+CEA0	36-23	—	31-65	27-88	ᄏ+ᅢ+ᆷ
캡	U+CEA1	36-24	—	31-66	27-89	ᄏ+ᅢ+ᆸ
캣	U+CEA3	36-25	—	31-67	45-75	ᄏ+ᅢ+ᆺ
캤	U+CEA4	36-26	—	31-70	27-91	ᄏ+ᅢ+ᆻ
캥	U+CEA5	36-27	—	31-68	27-90	ᄏ+ᅢ+ᆼ
캩	U+CEA9	—	32-68	—	—	ᄏ+ᅢ+ᇀ
캪	U+CEAA	—	32-69	31-69	—	ᄏ+ᅢ+ᇁ
캬	U+CEAC	36-28	—	30-92	27-35	ᄏ+ᅣ+∅
캭	U+CEAD	36-29	—	30-93	27-36	ᄏ+ᅣ+ᆨ
캰	U+CEB0	—	32-70	30-94	45-59	ᄏ+ᅣ+ᆫ
캴	U+CEB4	—	32-71	—	—	ᄏ+ᅣ+ᆯ
캼	U+CEBC	—	32-72	31-01	—	ᄏ+ᅣ+ᆷ
캽	U+CEBD	—	32-73	31-02	—	ᄏ+ᅣ+ᆸ
캿	U+CEBF	—	32-74	—	—	ᄏ+ᅣ+ᆺ
컁	U+CEC1	36-30	—	31-03	27-37	ᄏ+ᅣ+ᆼ
컈	U+CEC8	—	32-75	31-71	—	ᄏ+ᅤ+∅
컌	U+CECC	—	32-76	—	—	ᄏ+ᅤ+ᆫ
커	U+CEE4	36-31	—	31-04	27-38	ᄏ+ᅥ+∅
컥	U+CEE5	36-32	—	31-05	27-39	ᄏ+ᅥ+ᆨ
컨	U+CEE8	36-33	—	31-06	27-40	ᄏ+ᅥ+ᆫ
컫	U+CEEB	36-34	—	31-07	27-41	ᄏ+ᅥ+ᆮ
컬	U+CEEC	36-35	—	31-08	27-42	ᄏ+ᅥ+ᆯ
컴	U+CEF4	36-36	—	31-09	27-43	ᄏ+ᅥ+ᆷ
컵	U+CEF5	36-37	—	31-10	27-44	ᄏ+ᅥ+ᆸ
컷	U+CEF7	36-38	—	31-11	27-45	ᄏ+ᅥ+ᆺ
컸	U+CEF8	36-39	—	31-15	27-48	ᄏ+ᅥ+ᆻ
컹	U+CEF9	36-40	—	31-12	27-46	ᄏ+ᅥ+ᆼ
컻	U+CEFB	—	32-77	—	—	ᄏ+ᅥ+ᆾ
컽	U+CEFD	—	32-78	31-13	27-47	ᄏ+ᅥ+ᇀ
컾	U+CEFE	—	32-79	31-14	—	ᄏ+ᅥ+ᇁ
케	U+CF00	36-41	—	31-72	27-92	ᄏ+ᅦ+∅
켁	U+CF01	36-42	—	31-73	45-76	ᄏ+ᅦ+ᆨ
켄	U+CF04	36-43	—	31-74	27-93	ᄏ+ᅦ+ᆫ
켇	U+CF07	—	32-80	—	45-77	ᄏ+ᅦ+ᆮ
켈	U+CF08	36-44	—	31-75	27-94	ᄏ+ᅦ+ᆯ
켐	U+CF10	36-45	—	31-76	45-78	ᄏ+ᅦ+ᆷ
켑	U+CF11	36-46	—	31-77	45-79	ᄏ+ᅦ+ᆸ
켓	U+CF13	36-47	—	31-78	28-01	ᄏ+ᅦ+ᆺ
켔	U+CF14	—	32-81	—	—	ᄏ+ᅦ+ᆻ
켕	U+CF15	36-48	—	31-79	28-02	ᄏ+ᅦ+ᆼ
켙	U+CF19	—	32-82	—	45-80	ᄏ+ᅦ+ᇀ
켚	U+CF1A	—	32-83	—	—	ᄏ+ᅦ+ᇁ
켜	U+CF1C	36-49	—	31-16	27-49	ᄏ+ᅧ+∅
켝	U+CF1D	—	32-84	—	45-60	ᄏ+ᅧ+ᆨ
켠	U+CF20	36-50	—	31-17	27-50	ᄏ+ᅧ+ᆫ
켣	U+CF23	—	32-85	—	45-61	ᄏ+ᅧ+ᆮ
켤	U+CF24	36-51	—	31-18	27-51	ᄏ+ᅧ+ᆯ
켬	U+CF2C	36-52	—	31-19	27-52	ᄏ+ᅧ+ᆷ
켭	U+CF2D	36-53	—	31-20	27-53	ᄏ+ᅧ+ᆸ
켯	U+CF2F	36-54	—	31-21	45-62	ᄏ+ᅧ+ᆺ
켰	U+CF30	36-55	—	31-23	27-54	ᄏ+ᅧ+ᆻ
켱	U+CF31	36-56	—	31-22	45-63	ᄏ+ᅧ+ᆼ
켸	U+CF38	36-57	—	31-80	28-03	ᄏ+ᅨ+∅
켹	U+CF39	—	32-86	—	—	ᄏ+ᅨ+ᆨ
켼	U+CF3C	—	32-87	—	—	ᄏ+ᅨ+ᆫ
콀	U+CF40	—	32-88	—	—	ᄏ+ᅨ+ᆯ
콈	U+CF48	—	32-89	—	—	ᄏ+ᅨ+ᆷ
콉	U+CF49	—	32-90	—	—	ᄏ+ᅨ+ᆸ
콋	U+CF4B	—	32-91	—	—	ᄏ+ᅨ+ᆺ
콌	U+CF4C	—	32-92	—	—	ᄏ+ᅨ+ᆻ
콍	U+CF4D	—	32-93	—	45-81	ᄏ+ᅨ+ᆼ
코	U+CF54	36-58	—	31-24	27-55	ᄏ+ᅩ+∅
콕	U+CF55	36-59	—	31-25	27-56	ᄏ+ᅩ+ᆨ
콘	U+CF58	36-60	—	31-26	27-57	ᄏ+ᅩ+ᆫ
콛	U+CF5B	—	32-94	—	45-64	ᄏ+ᅩ+ᆮ
콜	U+CF5C	36-61	—	31-27	27-58	ᄏ+ᅩ+ᆯ
콤	U+CF64	36-62	—	31-28	27-59	ᄏ+ᅩ+ᆷ
콥	U+CF65	36-63	—	31-29	27-60	ᄏ+ᅩ+ᆸ
콧	U+CF67	36-64	—	31-30	27-61	ᄏ+ᅩ+ᆺ
콩	U+CF69	36-65	—	31-31	27-62	ᄏ+ᅩ+ᆼ
콪	U+CF6A	—	33-01	—	45-65	ᄏ+ᅩ+ᆽ
콮	U+CF6E	—	33-02	—	—	ᄏ+ᅩ+ᇁ
콰	U+CF70	36-66	—	31-92	28-09	ᄏ+ᅪ+∅
콱	U+CF71	36-67	—	31-93	28-10	ᄏ+ᅪ+ᆨ
콴	U+CF74	36-68	—	31-94	46-01	ᄏ+ᅪ+ᆫ
콸	U+CF78	36-69	—	32-01	28-11	ᄏ+ᅪ+ᆯ
쾀	U+CF80	36-70	—	32-02	46-02	ᄏ+ᅪ+ᆷ
쾁	U+CF81	—	33-03	—	46-03	ᄏ+ᅪ+ᆸ
쾃	U+CF83	—	33-04	—	—	ᄏ+ᅪ+ᆺ
쾅	U+CF85	36-71	—	32-03	28-12	ᄏ+ᅪ+ᆼ
쾌	U+CF8C	36-72	—	32-08	28-16	ᄏ+ᅫ+∅
쾍	U+CF8D	—	33-05	—	—	ᄏ+ᅫ+ᆨ
쾐	U+CF90	—	33-06	32-09	—	ᄏ+ᅫ+ᆫ
쾓	U+CF93	—	33-07	—	46-05	ᄏ+ᅫ+ᆮ
쾔	U+CF94	—	33-08	32-10	—	ᄏ+ᅫ+ᆯ
쾜	U+CF9C	—	33-09	—	—	ᄏ+ᅫ+ᆷ
쾝	U+CF9D	—	33-10	—	—	ᄏ+ᅫ+ᆸ
쾟	U+CF9F	—	33-11	—	28-17	ᄏ+ᅫ+ᆺ
쾡	U+CFA1	36-73	—	32-11	46-06	ᄏ+ᅫ+ᆼ
쾨	U+CFA8	36-74	—	31-81	28-04	ᄏ+ᅬ+∅
쾩	U+CFA9	—	33-12	—	—	ᄏ+ᅬ+ᆨ
쾬	U+CFAC	—	33-13	—	45-82	ᄏ+ᅬ+ᆫ
쾰	U+CFB0	36-75	—	31-82	45-83	ᄏ+ᅬ+ᆯ
쾸	U+CFB8	—	33-14	—	45-84	ᄏ+ᅬ+ᆷ
쾹	U+CFB9	—	33-15	—	45-85	ᄏ+ᅬ+ᆸ
쾻	U+CFBB	—	33-16	—	—	ᄏ+ᅬ+ᆺ
쾽	U+CFBD	—	33-17	—	45-86	ᄏ+ᅬ+ᆼ
쿄	U+CFC4	36-76	—	31-32	27-63	ᄏ+ᅭ+∅
쿅	U+CFC5	—	33-18	—	—	ᄏ+ᅭ+ᆨ
쿈	U+CFC8	—	33-19	—	—	ᄏ+ᅭ+ᆫ
쿌	U+CFCC	—	33-20	—	—	ᄏ+ᅭ+ᆯ
쿔	U+CFD4	—	33-21	—	45-66	ᄏ+ᅭ+ᆷ
쿕	U+CFD5	—	33-22	—	—	ᄏ+ᅭ+ᆸ
쿗	U+CFD7	—	33-23	—	—	ᄏ+ᅭ+ᆺ
쿙	U+CFD9	—	33-24	—	—	ᄏ+ᅭ+ᆼ
쿠	U+CFE0	36-77	—	31-33	27-64	ᄏ+ᅮ+∅
쿡	U+CFE1	36-78	—	31-34	27-65	ᄏ+ᅮ+ᆨ
쿤	U+CFE4	36-79	—	31-35	45-67	ᄏ+ᅮ+ᆫ
쿧	U+CFE7	—	33-25	—	—	ᄏ+ᅮ+ᆮ
쿨	U+CFE8	36-80	—	31-36	27-66	ᄏ+ᅮ+ᆯ
쿰	U+CFF0	36-81	—	31-37	27-67	ᄏ+ᅮ+ᆷ
쿱	U+CFF1	36-82	—	31-38	45-68	ᄏ+ᅮ+ᆸ
쿳	U+CFF3	36-83	—	31-39	—	ᄏ+ᅮ+ᆺ
쿵	U+CFF5	36-84	—	31-40	27-68	ᄏ+ᅮ+ᆼ
쿺	U+CFFA	—	33-26	—	—	ᄏ+ᅮ+ᇁ
쿼	U+CFFC	36-85	—	32-04	28-13	ᄏ+ᅯ+∅
쿽	U+CFFD	—	33-27	—	—	ᄏ+ᅯ+ᆨ
퀀	U+D000	36-86	—	32-05	46-04	ᄏ+ᅯ+ᆫ
퀃	U+D003	—	33-28	—	—	ᄏ+ᅯ+ᆮ
퀄	U+D004	36-87	—	32-06	28-14	ᄏ+ᅯ+ᆯ
퀌	U+D00C	—	33-29	—	—	ᄏ+ᅯ+ᆷ
퀍	U+D00D	—	33-30	—	—	ᄏ+ᅯ+ᆸ
퀐	U+D010	—	33-31	—	—	ᄏ+ᅯ+ᆻ
퀑	U+D011	36-88	—	32-07	28-15	ᄏ+ᅯ+ᆼ
퀘	U+D018	36-89	—	32-12	28-18	ᄏ+ᅰ+∅
퀙	U+D019	—	33-32	32-13	46-07	ᄏ+ᅰ+ᆨ
퀜	U+D01C	—	33-33	—	46-08	ᄏ+ᅰ+ᆫ
퀠	U+D020	—	33-34	32-14	46-09	ᄏ+ᅰ+ᆯ
퀨	U+D028	—	33-35	—	46-10	ᄏ+ᅰ+ᆷ
퀩	U+D029	—	33-36	—	46-11	ᄏ+ᅰ+ᆸ
퀫	U+D02B	—	33-37	—	—	ᄏ+ᅰ+ᆺ
퀬	U+D02C	—	33-38	—	—	ᄏ+ᅰ+ᆻ
퀭	U+D02D	36-90	—	32-15	28-19	ᄏ+ᅰ+ᆼ
퀴	U+D034	36-91	—	31-83	28-05	ᄏ+ᅱ+∅
퀵	U+D035	36-92	—	31-84	28-06	ᄏ+ᅱ+ᆨ
퀸	U+D038	36-93	—	31-85	28-07	ᄏ+ᅱ+ᆫ
퀻	U+D03B	—	33-39	—	45-87	ᄏ+ᅱ+ᆮ
퀼	U+D03C	36-94	—	31-86	45-88	ᄏ+ᅱ+ᆯ
큄	U+D044	37-01	—	31-87	45-89	ᄏ+ᅱ+ᆷ
큅	U+D045	37-02	—	31-88	—	ᄏ+ᅱ+ᆸ
큇	U+D047	37-03	—	31-89	45-90	ᄏ+ᅱ+ᆺ
큉	U+D049	37-04	—	31-90	45-91	ᄏ+ᅱ+ᆼ
큐	U+D050	37-05	—	31-41	27-69	ᄏ+ᅲ+∅
큑	U+D051	—	33-40	—	—	ᄏ+ᅲ+ᆨ
큔	U+D054	37-06	—	31-42	45-69	ᄏ+ᅲ+ᆫ
큘	U+D058	37-07	—	31-43	45-70	ᄏ+ᅲ+ᆯ
큠	U+D060	37-08	—	31-44	—	ᄏ+ᅲ+ᆷ
큡	U+D061	—	33-41	—	—	ᄏ+ᅲ+ᆸ
큣	U+D063	—	33-42	—	—	ᄏ+ᅲ+ᆺ
큥	U+D065	—	33-43	—	45-71	ᄏ+ᅲ+ᆼ
큨	U+D068	—	33-44	—	—	ᄏ+ᅲ+ᆿ
크	U+D06C	37-09	—	31-45	27-70	ᄏ+ᅳ+∅
큭	U+D06D	37-10	—	31-46	45-72	ᄏ+ᅳ+ᆨ
큰	U+D070	37-11	—	31-47	27-71	ᄏ+ᅳ+ᆫ
큲	U+D072	—	33-45	—	—	ᄏ+ᅳ+ᆭ
클	U+D074	37-12	—	31-48	27-72	ᄏ+ᅳ+ᆯ
큶	U+D076	—	33-46	—	—	ᄏ+ᅳ+ᆱ
큼	U+D07C	37-13	—	31-49	27-73	ᄏ+ᅳ+ᆷ
큽	U+D07D	37-14	—	31-50	27-74	ᄏ+ᅳ+ᆸ
큿	U+D07F	—	33-47	—	—	ᄏ+ᅳ+ᆺ
킁	U+D081	37-15	—	31-51	27-75	ᄏ+ᅳ+ᆼ
킈	U+D088	—	33-48	31-91	28-08	ᄏ+ᅴ+∅
킉	U+D089	—	33-49	—	—	ᄏ+ᅴ+ᆨ
킌	U+D08C	—	33-50	—	45-92	ᄏ+ᅴ+ᆫ
킐	U+D090	—	33-51	—	45-93	ᄏ+ᅴ+ᆯ
킘	U+D098	—	33-52	—	—	ᄏ+ᅴ+ᆷ
킙	U+D099	—	33-53	—	—	ᄏ+ᅴ+ᆸ
킛	U+D09B	—	33-54	—	—	ᄏ+ᅴ+ᆺ
킝	U+D09D	—	33-55	—	45-94	ᄏ+ᅴ+ᆼ
키	U+D0A4	37-16	—	31-52	27-76	ᄏ+ᅵ+∅
킥	U+D0A5	37-17	—	31-53	27-77	ᄏ+ᅵ+ᆨ
킨	U+D0A8	37-18	—	31-54	27-78	ᄏ+ᅵ+ᆫ
킫	U+D0AB	—	33-56	—	45-73	ᄏ+ᅵ+ᆮ
킬	U+D0AC	37-19	—	31-55	27-79	ᄏ+ᅵ+ᆯ
킴	U+D0B4	37-20	—	31-56	27-80	ᄏ+ᅵ+ᆷ
킵	U+D0B5	37-21	—	31-57	27-81	ᄏ+ᅵ+ᆸ
킷	U+D0B7	37-22	—	31-58	27-82	ᄏ+ᅵ+ᆺ
킸	U+D0B8	—	33-57	—	—	ᄏ+ᅵ+ᆻ
킹	U+D0B9	37-23	—	31-59	27-83	ᄏ+ᅵ+ᆼ
킾	U+D0BE	—	33-58	31-60	—	ᄏ+ᅵ+ᇁ
타	U+D0C0	37-24	—	32-16	28-21	ᄐ+ᅡ+∅
탁	U+D0C1	37-25	—	32-17	28-22	ᄐ+ᅡ+ᆨ
탄	U+D0C4	37-26	—	32-18	28-23	ᄐ+ᅡ+ᆫ
탇	U+D0C7	—	33-59	—	46-12	ᄐ+ᅡ+ᆮ
탈	U+D0C8	37-27	—	32-19	28-24	ᄐ+ᅡ+ᆯ
탉	U+D0C9	37-28	—	32-20	28-25	ᄐ+ᅡ+ᆰ
탊	U+D0CA	—	33-60	—	46-13	ᄐ+ᅡ+ᆱ
탏	U+D0CF	—	33-61	—	46-14	ᄐ+ᅡ+ᆶ
탐	U+D0D0	37-29	—	32-21	28-26	ᄐ+ᅡ+ᆷ
탑	U+D0D1	37-30	—	32-22	28-27	ᄐ+ᅡ+ᆸ
탓	U+D0D3	37-31	—	32-23	28-28	ᄐ+ᅡ+ᆺ
탔	U+D0D4	37-32	—	32-26	28-30	ᄐ+ᅡ+ᆻ
탕	U+D0D5	37-33	—	32-24	28-29	ᄐ+ᅡ+ᆼ
탚	U+D0DA	—	33-62	32-25	—	ᄐ+ᅡ+ᇁ
태	U+D0DC	37-34	—	32-84	28-78	ᄐ+ᅢ+∅
택	U+D0DD	37-35	—	32-85	28-79	ᄐ+ᅢ+ᆨ
탠	U+D0E0	37-36	—	32-86	28-80	ᄐ+ᅢ+ᆫ
탢	U+D0E2	—	33-63	—	—	ᄐ+ᅢ+ᆭ
탣	U+D0E3	—	33-64	—	46-47	ᄐ+ᅢ+ᆮ
탤	U+D0E4	37-37	—	32-87	28-81	ᄐ+ᅢ+ᆯ
탥	U+D0E5	—	33-65	—	—	ᄐ+ᅢ+ᆰ
탬	U+D0EC	37-38	—	32-88	28-82	ᄐ+ᅢ+ᆷ
탭	U+D0ED	37-39	—	32-89	28-83	ᄐ+ᅢ+ᆸ
탯	U+D0EF	37-40	—	32-90	28-84	ᄐ+ᅢ+ᆺ
탰	U+D0F0	37-41	—	32-93	28-86	ᄐ+ᅢ+ᆻ
탱	U+D0F1	37-42	—	32-91	28-85	ᄐ+ᅢ+ᆼ
탶	U+D0F6	—	33-66	32-92	—	ᄐ+ᅢ+ᇁ
탸	U+D0F8	37-43	—	32-27	28-31	ᄐ+ᅣ+∅
탹	U+D0F9	—	33-67	—	46-15	ᄐ+ᅣ+ᆨ
탼	U+D0FC	—	33-68	32-28	46-16	ᄐ+ᅣ+ᆫ
턀	U+D100	—	33-69	—	—	ᄐ+ᅣ+ᆯ
턈	U+D108	—	33-70	—	—	ᄐ+ᅣ+ᆷ
턉	U+D109	—	33-71	—	—	ᄐ+ᅣ+ᆸ
턋	U+D10B	—	33-72	—	—	ᄐ+ᅣ+ᆺ
턍	U+D10D	37-44	—	32-29	46-17	ᄐ+ᅣ+ᆼ
턔	U+D114	—	33-73	32-94	—	ᄐ+ᅤ+∅
턘	U+D118	—	33-74	—	—	ᄐ+ᅤ+ᆫ
턚	U+D11A	—	33-75	—	—	ᄐ+ᅤ+ᆭ
터	U+D130	37-45	—	32-30	28-32	ᄐ+ᅥ+∅
턱	U+D131	37-46	—	32-31	28-33	ᄐ+ᅥ+ᆨ
턴	U+D134	37-47	—	32-32	28-34	ᄐ+ᅥ+ᆫ
턷	U+D137	—	33-76	—	46-18	ᄐ+ᅥ+ᆮ
털	U+D138	37-48	—	32-33	28-35	ᄐ+ᅥ+ᆯ
턹	U+D139	—	33-77	—	—	ᄐ+ᅥ+ᆰ
턺	U+D13A	37-49	—	32-34	28-36	ᄐ+ᅥ+ᆱ
턻	U+D13B	—	33-78	—	46-19	ᄐ+ᅥ+ᆲ
텀	U+D140	37-50	—	32-35	28-37	ᄐ+ᅥ+ᆷ
텁	U+D141	37-51	—	32-36	28-38	ᄐ+ᅥ+ᆸ
텃	U+D143	37-52	—	32-37	46-20	ᄐ+ᅥ+ᆺ
텄	U+D144	37-53	—	32-39	28-40	ᄐ+ᅥ+ᆻ
텅	U+D145	37-54	—	32-38	28-39	ᄐ+ᅥ+ᆼ
테	U+D14C	37-55	—	33-01	28-87	ᄐ+ᅦ+∅
텍	U+D14D	37-56	—	33-02	28-88	ᄐ+ᅦ+ᆨ
텐	U+D150	37-57	—	33-03	28-89	ᄐ+ᅦ+ᆫ
텓	U+D153	—	33-79	—	46-48	ᄐ+ᅦ+ᆮ
텔	U+D154	37-58	—	33-04	28-90	ᄐ+ᅦ+ᆯ
템	U+D15C	37-59	—	33-05	28-91	ᄐ+ᅦ+ᆷ
텝	U+D15D	37-60	—	33-06	28-92	ᄐ+ᅦ+ᆸ
텟	U+D15F	37-61	—	33-07	46-49	ᄐ+ᅦ+ᆺ
텠	U+D160	—	33-80	—	—	ᄐ+ᅦ+ᆻ
텡	U+D161	37-62	—	33-08	28-93	ᄐ+ᅦ+ᆼ
텦	U+D166	—	33-81	33-09	46-50	ᄐ+ᅦ+ᇁ
텨	U+D168	37-63	—	32-40	28-41	ᄐ+ᅧ+∅
텩	U+D169	—	33-82	—	46-21	ᄐ+ᅧ+ᆨ
텬	U+D16C	37-64	—	32-41	46-22	ᄐ+ᅧ+ᆫ
텯	U+D16F	—	33-83	—	46-23	ᄐ+ᅧ+ᆮ
텰	U+D170	—	33-84	—	46-24	ᄐ+ᅧ+ᆯ
텸	U+D178	—	33-85	—	46-25	ᄐ+ᅧ+ᆷ
텹	U+D179	—	33-86	—	46-26	ᄐ+ᅧ+ᆸ
텻	U+D17B	—	33-87	—	46-27	ᄐ+ᅧ+ᆺ
텼	U+D17C	37-65	—	32-42	28-42	ᄐ+ᅧ+ᆻ
텽	U+D17D	—	33-88	—	46-28	ᄐ+ᅧ+ᆼ
톄	U+D184	37-66	—	33-10	46-51	ᄐ+ᅨ+∅
톅	U+D185	—	33-89	—	—	ᄐ+ᅨ+ᆨ
톈	U+D188	37-67	—	33-11	46-52	ᄐ+ᅨ+ᆫ
톌	U+D18C	—	33-90	—	—	ᄐ+ᅨ+ᆯ
톔	U+D194	—	33-91	—	—	ᄐ+ᅨ+ᆷ
톗	U+D197	—	33-92	—	46-53	ᄐ+ᅨ+ᆺ
톙	U+D199	—	33-93	—	46-54	ᄐ+ᅨ+ᆼ
토	U+D1A0	37-68	—	32-43	28-43	ᄐ+ᅩ+∅
톡	U+D1A1	37-69	—	32-44	28-44	ᄐ+ᅩ+ᆨ
톤	U+D1A4	37-70	—	32-45	28-45	ᄐ+ᅩ+ᆫ
톧	U+D1A7	—	33-94	—	46-29	ᄐ+ᅩ+ᆮ
톨	U+D1A8	37-71	—	32-46	28-46	ᄐ+ᅩ+ᆯ
톰	U+D1B0	37-72	—	32-47	28-47	ᄐ+ᅩ+ᆷ
톱	U+D1B1	37-73	—	32-48	28-48	ᄐ+ᅩ+ᆸ
톳	U+D1B3	37-74	—	32-49	28-49	ᄐ+ᅩ+ᆺ
통	U+D1B5	37-75	—	32-50	28-50	ᄐ+ᅩ+ᆼ
톷	U+D1B7	—	34-01	—	46-30	ᄐ+ᅩ+ᆾ
톸	U+D1B8	—	34-02	—	—	ᄐ+ᅩ+ᆿ
톹	U+D1B9	—	34-03	—	46-31	ᄐ+ᅩ+ᇀ
톺	U+D1BA	37-76	—	32-51	28-51	ᄐ+ᅩ+ᇁ
톼	U+D1BC	37-77	—	33-28	46-70	ᄐ+ᅪ+∅
톽	U+D1BD	—	34-04	—	46-71	ᄐ+ᅪ+ᆨ
퇀	U+D1C0	37-78	—	33-29	29-09	ᄐ+ᅪ+ᆫ
퇄	U+D1C4	—	34-05	—	—	ᄐ+ᅪ+ᆯ
퇌	U+D1CC	—	34-06	—	—	ᄐ+ᅪ+ᆷ
퇍	U+D1CD	—	34-07	—	—	ᄐ+ᅪ+ᆸ
퇏	U+D1CF	—	34-08	—	—	ᄐ+ᅪ+ᆺ
퇑	U+D1D1	—	34-09	—	46-72	ᄐ+ᅪ+ᆼ
퇘	U+D1D8	37-79	—	33-32	46-75	ᄐ+ᅫ+∅
퇬	U+D1EC	—	34-10	—	—	ᄐ+ᅫ+ᆻ
퇭	U+D1ED	—	34-11	—	—	ᄐ+ᅫ+ᆼ
퇴	U+D1F4	37-80	—	33-12	28-94	ᄐ+ᅬ+∅
퇵	U+D1F5	—	34-12	—	46-55	ᄐ+ᅬ+ᆨ
퇸	U+D1F8	37-81	—	33-13	46-56	ᄐ+ᅬ+ᆫ
퇻	U+D1FB	—	34-13	—	46-57	ᄐ+ᅬ+ᆮ
퇼	U+D1FC	—	34-14	—	46-58	ᄐ+ᅬ+ᆯ
툄	U+D204	—	34-15	—	46-59	ᄐ+ᅬ+ᆷ
툅	U+D205	—	34-16	—	46-60	ᄐ+ᅬ+ᆸ
툇	U+D207	37-82	—	33-14	29-01	ᄐ+ᅬ+ᆺ
툈	U+D208	—	34-17	—	—	ᄐ+ᅬ+ᆻ
툉	U+D209	37-83	—	33-15	46-61	ᄐ+ᅬ+ᆼ
툐	U+D210	37-84	—	32-52	28-52	ᄐ+ᅭ+∅
툑	U+D211	—	34-18	—	46-32	ᄐ+ᅭ+ᆨ
툔	U+D214	—	34-19	—	46-33	ᄐ+ᅭ+ᆫ
툘	U+D218	—	34-20	—	—	ᄐ+ᅭ+ᆯ
툠	U+D220	—	34-21	—	46-34	ᄐ+ᅭ+ᆷ
툡	U+D221	—	34-22	—	—	ᄐ+ᅭ+ᆸ
툣	U+D223	—	34-23	—	46-35	ᄐ+ᅭ+ᆺ
툥	U+D225	—	34-24	—	46-36	ᄐ+ᅭ+ᆼ
투	U+D22C	37-85	—	32-53	28-53	ᄐ+ᅮ+∅
툭	U+D22D	37-86	—	32-54	28-54	ᄐ+ᅮ+ᆨ
툰	U+D230	37-87	—	32-55	28-55	ᄐ+ᅮ+ᆫ
툳	U+D233	—	34-25	—	46-37	ᄐ+ᅮ+ᆮ
툴	U+D234	37-88	—	32-56	28-56	ᄐ+ᅮ+ᆯ
툶	U+D236	—	34-26	—	—	ᄐ+ᅮ+ᆱ
툼	U+D23C	37-89	—	32-57	28-57	ᄐ+ᅮ+ᆷ
툽	U+D23D	37-90	—	32-58	28-58	ᄐ+ᅮ+ᆸ
툿	U+D23F	37-91	—	32-59	46-38	ᄐ+ᅮ+ᆺ
퉁	U+D241	37-92	—	32-60	28-59	ᄐ+ᅮ+ᆼ
퉈	U+D248	37-93	—	33-30	29-10	ᄐ+ᅯ+∅
퉉	U+D249	—	34-27	—	—	ᄐ+ᅯ+ᆨ
퉌	U+D24C	—	34-28	—	—	ᄐ+ᅯ+ᆫ
퉏	U+D24F	—	34-29	—	46-73	ᄐ+ᅯ+ᆮ
퉐	U+D250	—	34-30	—	—	ᄐ+ᅯ+ᆯ
퉔	U+D254	—	34-31	—	—	ᄐ+ᅯ+ᆳ
퉘	U+D258	—	34-32	—	—	ᄐ+ᅯ+ᆷ
퉙	U+D259	—	34-33	—	—	ᄐ+ᅯ+ᆸ
퉛	U+D25B	—	34-34	—	—	ᄐ+ᅯ+ᆺ
퉜	U+D25C	37-94	—	33-31	29-11	ᄐ+ᅯ+ᆻ
퉝	U+D25D	—	34-35	—	46-74	ᄐ+ᅯ+ᆼ
퉤	U+D264	38-01	—	33-33	29-12	ᄐ+ᅰ+∅
퉥	U+D265	—	34-36	—	—	ᄐ+ᅰ+ᆨ
퉨	U+D268	—	34-37	33-34	46-76	ᄐ+ᅰ+ᆫ
퉫	U+D26B	—	34-38	—	46-77	ᄐ+ᅰ+ᆮ
퉬	U+D26C	—	34-39	—	46-78	ᄐ+ᅰ+ᆯ
퉴	U+D274	—	34-40	—	46-79	ᄐ+ᅰ+ᆷ
퉵	U+D275	—	34-41	—	46-80	ᄐ+ᅰ+ᆸ
퉷	U+D277	—	34-42	—	—	ᄐ+ᅰ+ᆺ
퉸	U+D278	—	34-43	33-35	29-13	ᄐ+ᅰ+ᆻ
퉹	U+D279	—	34-44	—	—	ᄐ+ᅰ+ᆼ
튀	U+D280	38-02	—	33-16	29-02	ᄐ+ᅱ+∅
튁	U+D281	38-03	—	33-17	46-62	ᄐ+ᅱ+ᆨ
튄	U+D284	38-04	—	33-18	29-03	ᄐ+ᅱ+ᆫ
튇	U+D287	—	34-45	—	46-63	ᄐ+ᅱ+ᆮ
튈	U+D288	38-05	—	33-19	29-04	ᄐ+ᅱ+ᆯ
튐	U+D290	38-06	—	33-20	29-05	ᄐ+ᅱ+ᆷ
튑	U+D291	38-07	—	33-21	29-06	ᄐ+ᅱ+ᆸ
튓	U+D293	—	34-46	—	46-64	ᄐ+ᅱ+ᆺ
튕	U+D295	38-08	—	33-22	29-07	ᄐ+ᅱ+ᆼ
튜	U+D29C	38-09	—	32-61	28-60	ᄐ+ᅲ+∅
튝	U+D29D	—	34-47	—	46-39	ᄐ+ᅲ+ᆨ
튠	U+D2A0	38-10	—	32-62	46-40	ᄐ+ᅲ+ᆫ
튤	U+D2A4	38-11	—	32-63	46-41	ᄐ+ᅲ+ᆯ
튬	U+D2AC	38-12	—	32-64	28-61	ᄐ+ᅲ+ᆷ
튭	U+D2AD	—	34-48	—	—	ᄐ+ᅲ+ᆸ
튯	U+D2AF	—	34-49	—	—	ᄐ+ᅲ+ᆺ
튱	U+D2B1	38-13	—	32-65	46-42	ᄐ+ᅲ+ᆼ
트	U+D2B8	38-14	—	32-66	28-62	ᄐ+ᅳ+∅
특	U+D2B9	38-15	—	32-67	28-63	ᄐ+ᅳ+ᆨ
튻	U+D2BB	—	34-50	—	—	ᄐ+ᅳ+ᆪ
튼	U+D2BC	38-16	—	32-68	28-64	ᄐ+ᅳ+ᆫ
튿	U+D2BF	38-17	—	32-69	28-65	ᄐ+ᅳ+ᆮ
틀	U+D2C0	38-18	—	32-70	28-66	ᄐ+ᅳ+ᆯ
틁	U+D2C1	—	34-51	—	—	ᄐ+ᅳ+ᆰ
틂	U+D2C2	38-19	—	32-71	28-67	ᄐ+ᅳ+ᆱ
틄	U+D2C4	—	34-52	—	46-43	ᄐ+ᅳ+ᆳ
틈	U+D2C8	38-20	—	32-72	28-68	ᄐ+ᅳ+ᆷ
틉	U+D2C9	38-21	—	32-73	28-69	ᄐ+ᅳ+ᆸ
틋	U+D2CB	38-22	—	32-74	28-70	ᄐ+ᅳ+ᆺ
틍	U+D2CD	—	34-53	32-75	46-44	ᄐ+ᅳ+ᆼ
틔	U+D2D4	38-23	—	33-23	29-08	ᄐ+ᅴ+∅
틕	U+D2D5	—	34-54	—	—	ᄐ+ᅴ+ᆨ
틘	U+D2D8	38-24	—	33-24	46-65	ᄐ+ᅴ+ᆫ
틜	U+D2DC	38-25	—	33-25	46-66	ᄐ+ᅴ+ᆯ
틠	U+D2E0	—	34-55	—	—	ᄐ+ᅴ+ᆳ
틤	U+D2E4	38-26	—	33-26	46-67	ᄐ+ᅴ+ᆷ
틥	U+D2E5	38-27	—	33-27	46-68	ᄐ+ᅴ+ᆸ
틧	U+D2E7	—	34-56	—	46-69	ᄐ+ᅴ+ᆺ
틩	U+D2E9	—	34-57	—	—	ᄐ+ᅴ+ᆼ
티	U+D2F0	38-28	—	32-76	28-71	ᄐ+ᅵ+∅
틱	U+D2F1	38-29	—	32-77	28-72	ᄐ+ᅵ+ᆨ
틴	U+D2F4	38-30	—	32-78	28-73	ᄐ+ᅵ+ᆫ
틷	U+D2F7	—	34-58	—	46-45	ᄐ+ᅵ+ᆮ
틸	U+D2F8	38-31	—	32-79	28-74	ᄐ+ᅵ+ᆯ
팀	U+D300	38-32	—	32-80	28-75	ᄐ+ᅵ+ᆷ
팁	U+D301	38-33	—	32-81	28-76	ᄐ+ᅵ+ᆸ
팃	U+D303	38-34	—	32-82	46-46	ᄐ+ᅵ+ᆺ
팅	U+D305	38-35	—	32-83	28-77	ᄐ+ᅵ+ᆼ
팈	U+D308	—	34-59	—	—	ᄐ+ᅵ+ᆿ
팊	U+D30A	—	34-60	—	—	ᄐ+ᅵ+ᇁ
파	U+D30C	38-36	—	33-36	29-15	ᄑ+ᅡ+∅
팍	U+D30D	38-37	—	33-37	29-16	ᄑ+ᅡ+ᆨ
팎	U+D30E	38-38	—	33-46	29-25	ᄑ+ᅡ+ᆩ
판	U+D310	38-39	—	33-38	29-17	ᄑ+ᅡ+ᆫ
팓	U+D313	—	34-61	—	46-81	ᄑ+ᅡ+ᆮ
팔	U+D314	38-40	—	33-39	29-18	ᄑ+ᅡ+ᆯ
팖	U+D316	38-41	—	33-40	29-19	ᄑ+ᅡ+ᆱ
팜	U+D31C	38-42	—	33-41	29-20	ᄑ+ᅡ+ᆷ
팝	U+D31D	38-43	—	33-42	29-21	ᄑ+ᅡ+ᆸ
팟	U+D31F	38-44	—	33-43	29-22	ᄑ+ᅡ+ᆺ
팠	U+D320	38-45	—	33-47	29-26	ᄑ+ᅡ+ᆻ
팡	U+D321	38-46	—	33-44	29-23	ᄑ+ᅡ+ᆼ
팣	U+D323	—	34-62	—	46-82	ᄑ+ᅡ+ᆾ
팥	U+D325	38-47	—	33-45	29-24	ᄑ+ᅡ+ᇀ
팦	U+D326	—	34-63	—	—	ᄑ+ᅡ+ᇁ
패	U+D328	38-48	—	34-18	29-74	ᄑ+ᅢ+∅
팩	U+D329	38-49	—	34-19	29-75	ᄑ+ᅢ+ᆨ
팬	U+D32C	38-50	—	34-20	29-76	ᄑ+ᅢ+ᆫ
팯	U+D32F	—	34-64	—	47-17	ᄑ+ᅢ+ᆮ
팰	U+D330	38-51	—	34-21	29-77	ᄑ+ᅢ+ᆯ
팸	U+D338	38-52	—	34-22	29-78	ᄑ+ᅢ+ᆷ
팹	U+D339	38-53	—	34-23	29-79	ᄑ+ᅢ+ᆸ
팻	U+D33B	38-54	—	34-24	47-18	ᄑ+ᅢ+ᆺ
팼	U+D33C	38-55	—	34-26	29-81	ᄑ+ᅢ+ᆻ
팽	U+D33D	38-56	—	34-25	29-80	ᄑ+ᅢ+ᆼ
퍁	U+D341	—	34-65	—	—	ᄑ+ᅢ+ᇀ
퍄	U+D344	38-57	—	33-48	29-27	ᄑ+ᅣ+∅
퍅	U+D345	38-58	—	33-49	29-28	ᄑ+ᅣ+ᆨ
퍈	U+D348	—	34-66	—	46-83	ᄑ+ᅣ+ᆫ
퍌	U+D34C	—	34-67	—	—	ᄑ+ᅣ+ᆯ
퍔	U+D354	—	34-68	—	—	ᄑ+ᅣ+ᆷ
퍕	U+D355	—	34-69	—	—	ᄑ+ᅣ+ᆸ
퍗	U+D357	—	34-70	—	—	ᄑ+ᅣ+ᆺ
퍙	U+D359	—	34-71	—	46-84	ᄑ+ᅣ+ᆼ
퍠	U+D360	—	34-72	34-27	—	ᄑ+ᅤ+∅
퍼	U+D37C	38-59	—	33-50	29-29	ᄑ+ᅥ+∅
퍽	U+D37D	38-60	—	33-51	29-30	ᄑ+ᅥ+ᆨ
펀	U+D380	38-61	—	33-52	29-31	ᄑ+ᅥ+ᆫ
펃	U+D383	—	34-73	—	46-85	ᄑ+ᅥ+ᆮ
펄	U+D384	38-62	—	33-53	29-32	ᄑ+ᅥ+ᆯ
펌	U+D38C	38-63	—	33-54	29-33	ᄑ+ᅥ+ᆷ
펍	U+D38D	38-64	—	33-55	46-86	ᄑ+ᅥ+ᆸ
펎	U+D38E	—	34-74	—	—	ᄑ+ᅥ+ᆹ
펏	U+D38F	38-65	—	33-56	46-87	ᄑ+ᅥ+ᆺ
펐	U+D390	38-66	—	33-58	29-35	ᄑ+ᅥ+ᆻ
펑	U+D391	38-67	—	33-57	29-34	ᄑ+ᅥ+ᆼ
펕	U+D395	—	34-75	—	46-88	ᄑ+ᅥ+ᇀ
페	U+D398	38-68	—	34-28	29-82	ᄑ+ᅦ+∅
펙	U+D399	38-69	—	34-29	29-83	ᄑ+ᅦ+ᆨ
펜	U+D39C	38-70	—	34-30	29-84	ᄑ+ᅦ+ᆫ
펟	U+D39F	—	34-76	—	47-19	ᄑ+ᅦ+ᆮ
펠	U+D3A0	38-71	—	34-31	29-85	ᄑ+ᅦ+ᆯ
펨	U+D3A8	38-72	—	34-32	47-20	ᄑ+ᅦ+ᆷ
펩	U+D3A9	38-73	—	34-33	47-21	ᄑ+ᅦ+ᆸ
펫	U+D3AB	38-74	—	34-34	47-22	ᄑ+ᅦ+ᆺ
펬	U+D3AC	—	34-77	—	47-23	ᄑ+ᅦ+ᆻ
펭	U+D3AD	38-75	—	34-35	29-86	ᄑ+ᅦ+ᆼ
펲	U+D3B2	—	34-78	34-36	—	ᄑ+ᅦ+ᇁ
펴	U+D3B4	38-76	—	33-59	29-36	ᄑ+ᅧ+∅
펵	U+D3B5	—	34-79	33-60	46-89	ᄑ+ᅧ+ᆨ
편	U+D3B8	38-77	—	33-61	29-37	ᄑ+ᅧ+ᆫ
펹	U+D3B9	—	34-80	—	46-90	ᄑ+ᅧ+ᆬ
펻	U+D3BB	—	34-81	—	46-91	ᄑ+ᅧ+ᆮ
펼	U+D3BC	38-78	—	33-62	29-38	ᄑ+ᅧ+ᆯ
폄	U+D3C4	38-79	—	33-63	29-39	ᄑ+ᅧ+ᆷ
폅	U+D3C5	38-80	—	33-64	29-40	ᄑ+ᅧ+ᆸ
폇	U+D3C7	—	34-82	33-65	46-92	ᄑ+ᅧ+ᆺ
폈	U+D3C8	38-81	—	33-67	29-42	ᄑ+ᅧ+ᆻ
평	U+D3C9	38-82	—	33-66	29-41	ᄑ+ᅧ+ᆼ
폐	U+D3D0	38-83	—	34-37	29-87	ᄑ+ᅨ+∅
폑	U+D3D1	—	34-83	—	—	ᄑ+ᅨ+ᆨ
폔	U+D3D4	—	34-84	34-38	47-24	ᄑ+ᅨ+ᆫ
폗	U+D3D7	—	34-85	—	47-25	ᄑ+ᅨ+ᆮ
폘	U+D3D8	38-84	—	34-39	47-26	ᄑ+ᅨ+ᆯ
폠	U+D3E0	—	34-86	—	47-27	ᄑ+ᅨ+ᆷ
폡	U+D3E1	38-85	—	34-40	47-28	ᄑ+ᅨ+ᆸ
폣	U+D3E3	38-86	—	34-41	47-29	ᄑ+ᅨ+ᆺ
폥	U+D3E5	—	34-87	—	47-30	ᄑ+ᅨ+ᆼ
포	U+D3EC	38-87	—	33-68	29-43	ᄑ+ᅩ+∅
폭	U+D3ED	38-88	—	33-69	29-44	ᄑ+ᅩ+ᆨ
폮	U+D3EE	—	34-88	—	—	ᄑ+ᅩ+ᆩ
폰	U+D3F0	38-89	—	33-70	29-45	ᄑ+ᅩ+ᆫ
폳	U+D3F3	—	34-89	—	46-93	ᄑ+ᅩ+ᆮ
폴	U+D3F4	38-90	—	33-71	29-46	ᄑ+ᅩ+ᆯ
폼	U+D3FC	38-91	—	33-72	29-47	ᄑ+ᅩ+ᆷ
폽	U+D3FD	38-92	—	33-73	46-94	ᄑ+ᅩ+ᆸ
폿	U+D3FF	38-93	—	33-74	47-01	ᄑ+ᅩ+ᆺ
퐁	U+D401	38-94	—	33-75	29-48	ᄑ+ᅩ+ᆼ
퐄	U+D404	—	34-90	—	—	ᄑ+ᅩ+ᆿ
퐅	U+D405	—	34-91	—	47-02	ᄑ+ᅩ+ᇀ
퐆	U+D406	—	34-92	—	—	ᄑ+ᅩ+ᇁ
퐈	U+D408	39-01	—	34-51	47-45	ᄑ+ᅪ+∅
퐉	U+D409	—	34-93	—	—	ᄑ+ᅪ+ᆨ
퐌	U+D40C	—	34-94	—	47-46	ᄑ+ᅪ+ᆫ
퐐	U+D410	—	35-01	—	47-47	ᄑ+ᅪ+ᆯ
퐘	U+D418	—	35-02	—	47-48	ᄑ+ᅪ+ᆷ
퐙	U+D419	—	35-03	—	47-49	ᄑ+ᅪ+ᆸ
퐛	U+D41B	—	35-04	—	—	ᄑ+ᅪ+ᆺ
퐝	U+D41D	39-02	—	34-52	47-50	ᄑ+ᅪ+ᆼ
퐤	U+D424	—	35-05	—	—	ᄑ+ᅫ+∅
푀	U+D440	39-03	—	34-42	47-31	ᄑ+ᅬ+∅
푁	U+D441	—	35-06	—	—	ᄑ+ᅬ+ᆨ
푄	U+D444	39-04	—	34-43	47-32	ᄑ+ᅬ+ᆫ
푈	U+D448	—	35-07	—	47-33	ᄑ+ᅬ+ᆯ
푐	U+D450	—	35-08	—	47-34	ᄑ+ᅬ+ᆷ
푑	U+D451	—	35-09	—	47-35	ᄑ+ᅬ+ᆸ
푓	U+D453	—	35-10	—	—	ᄑ+ᅬ+ᆺ
푕	U+D455	—	35-11	—	—	ᄑ+ᅬ+ᆼ
표	U+D45C	39-05	—	33-76	29-49	ᄑ+ᅭ+∅
푝	U+D45D	—	35-12	—	—	ᄑ+ᅭ+ᆨ
푠	U+D460	39-06	—	33-77	47-03	ᄑ+ᅭ+ᆫ
푣	U+D463	—	35-13	—	47-04	ᄑ+ᅭ+ᆮ
푤	U+D464	39-07	—	33-78	47-05	ᄑ+ᅭ+ᆯ
푬	U+D46C	—	35-14	—	47-06	ᄑ+ᅭ+ᆷ
푭	U+D46D	39-08	—	33-79	47-07	ᄑ+ᅭ+ᆸ
푯	U+D46F	39-09	—	33-80	47-08	ᄑ+ᅭ+ᆺ
푱	U+D471	—	35-15	—	29-50	ᄑ+ᅭ+ᆼ
푸	U+D478	39-10	—	33-81	29-51	ᄑ+ᅮ+∅
푹	U+D479	39-11	—	33-82	29-52	ᄑ+ᅮ+ᆨ
푼	U+D47C	39-12	—	33-83	29-53	ᄑ+ᅮ+ᆫ
푿	U+D47F	39-13	—	33-84	47-09	ᄑ+ᅮ+ᆮ
풀	U+D480	39-14	—	33-85	29-54	ᄑ+ᅮ+ᆯ
풂	U+D482	39-15	—	33-86	29-55	ᄑ+ᅮ+ᆱ
품	U+D488	39-16	—	33-87	29-56	ᄑ+ᅮ+ᆷ
풉	U+D489	39-17	—	33-88	29-57	ᄑ+ᅮ+ᆸ
풋	U+D48B	39-18	—	33-89	29-58	ᄑ+ᅮ+ᆺ
풍	U+D48D	39-19	—	33-90	29-59	ᄑ+ᅮ+ᆼ
풔	U+D494	39-20	—	34-53	47-51	ᄑ+ᅯ+∅
풕	U+D495	—	35-16	—	—	ᄑ+ᅯ+ᆨ
풘	U+D498	—	35-17	—	47-52	ᄑ+ᅯ+ᆫ
풛	U+D49B	—	35-18	—	—	ᄑ+ᅯ+ᆮ
풜	U+D49C	—	35-19	—	—	ᄑ+ᅯ+ᆯ
풤	U+D4A4	—	35-20	—	—	ᄑ+ᅯ+ᆷ
풥	U+D4A5	—	35-21	—	—	ᄑ+ᅯ+ᆸ
풧	U+D4A7	—	35-22	—	—	ᄑ+ᅯ+ᆺ
풨	U+D4A8	—	35-23	—	—	ᄑ+ᅯ+ᆻ
풩	U+D4A9	39-21	—	34-54	—	ᄑ+ᅯ+ᆼ
풰	U+D4B0	—	35-24	—	47-53	ᄑ+ᅰ+∅
풱	U+D4B1	—	35-25	—	—	ᄑ+ᅰ+ᆨ
풴	U+D4B4	—	35-26	—	47-54	ᄑ+ᅰ+ᆫ
풸	U+D4B8	—	35-27	—	47-55	ᄑ+ᅰ+ᆯ
퓀	U+D4C0	—	35-28	—	47-56	ᄑ+ᅰ+ᆷ
퓁	U+D4C1	—	35-29	—	47-57	ᄑ+ᅰ+ᆸ
퓃	U+D4C3	—	35-30	—	—	ᄑ+ᅰ+ᆺ
퓅	U+D4C5	—	35-31	—	—	ᄑ+ᅰ+ᆼ
퓌	U+D4CC	39-22	—	34-44	47-36	ᄑ+ᅱ+∅
퓍	U+D4CD	—	35-32	—	—	ᄑ+ᅱ+ᆨ
퓐	U+D4D0	39-23	—	34-45	47-37	ᄑ+ᅱ+ᆫ
퓔	U+D4D4	39-24	—	34-46	47-38	ᄑ+ᅱ+ᆯ
퓜	U+D4DC	39-25	—	34-47	47-39	ᄑ+ᅱ+ᆷ
퓝	U+D4DD	—	35-33	—	—	ᄑ+ᅱ+ᆸ
퓟	U+D4DF	39-26	—	34-48	—	ᄑ+ᅱ+ᆺ
퓡	U+D4E1	—	35-34	—	47-40	ᄑ+ᅱ+ᆼ
퓨	U+D4E8	39-27	—	33-91	29-60	ᄑ+ᅲ+∅
퓩	U+D4E9	—	35-35	—	—	ᄑ+ᅲ+ᆨ
퓬	U+D4EC	39-28	—	33-92	—	ᄑ+ᅲ+ᆫ
퓯	U+D4EF	—	35-36	—	—	ᄑ+ᅲ+ᆮ
퓰	U+D4F0	39-29	—	33-93	47-10	ᄑ+ᅲ+ᆯ
퓸	U+D4F8	39-30	—	33-94	47-11	ᄑ+ᅲ+ᆷ
퓹	U+D4F9	—	35-37	—	—	ᄑ+ᅲ+ᆸ
퓻	U+D4FB	39-31	—	34-01	—	ᄑ+ᅲ+ᆺ
퓽	U+D4FD	39-32	—	34-02	—	ᄑ+ᅲ+ᆼ
프	U+D504	39-33	—	34-03	29-61	ᄑ+ᅳ+∅
픅	U+D505	—	35-38	—	—	ᄑ+ᅳ+ᆨ
픈	U+D508	39-34	—	34-04	29-62	ᄑ+ᅳ+ᆫ
픋	U+D50B	—	35-39	—	47-12	ᄑ+ᅳ+ᆮ
플	U+D50C	39-35	—	34-05	29-63	ᄑ+ᅳ+ᆯ
픐	U+D510	—	35-40	—	47-13	ᄑ+ᅳ+ᆳ
픔	U+D514	39-36	—	34-06	29-64	ᄑ+ᅳ+ᆷ
픕	U+D515	39-37	—	34-07	29-65	ᄑ+ᅳ+ᆸ
픗	U+D517	39-38	—	34-08	47-14	ᄑ+ᅳ+ᆺ
픙	U+D519	—	35-41	34-09	47-15	ᄑ+ᅳ+ᆼ
픠	U+D520	—	35-42	34-49	47-41	ᄑ+ᅴ+∅
픡	U+D521	—	35-43	—	—	ᄑ+ᅴ+ᆨ
픤	U+D524	—	35-44	34-50	47-42	ᄑ+ᅴ+ᆫ
픨	U+D528	—	35-45	—	47-43	ᄑ+ᅴ+ᆯ
픰	U+D530	—	35-46	—	—	ᄑ+ᅴ+ᆷ
픱	U+D531	—	35-47	—	—	ᄑ+ᅴ+ᆸ
픳	U+D533	—	35-48	—	47-44	ᄑ+ᅴ+ᆺ
픵	U+D535	—	35-49	—	—	ᄑ+ᅴ+ᆼ
피	U+D53C	39-39	—	34-10	29-66	ᄑ+ᅵ+∅
픽	U+D53D	39-40	—	34-11	29-67	ᄑ+ᅵ+ᆨ
핀	U+D540	39-41	—	34-12	29-68	ᄑ+ᅵ+ᆫ
핃	U+D543	—	35-50	—	47-16	ᄑ+ᅵ+ᆮ
필	U+D544	39-42	—	34-13	29-69	ᄑ+ᅵ+ᆯ
핌	U+D54C	39-43	—	34-14	29-70	ᄑ+ᅵ+ᆷ
핍	U+D54D	39-44	—	34-15	29-71	ᄑ+ᅵ+ᆸ
핏	U+D54F	39-45	—	34-16	29-72	ᄑ+ᅵ+ᆺ
핑	U+D551	39-46	—	34-17	29-73	ᄑ+ᅵ+ᆼ
핕	U+D555	—	35-51	—	—	ᄑ+ᅵ+ᇀ
핖	U+D556	—	35-52	—	—	ᄑ+ᅵ+ᇁ
하	U+D558	39-47	—	34-55	29-89	ᄒ+ᅡ+∅
학	U+D559	39-48	—	34-56	29-90	ᄒ+ᅡ+ᆨ
한	U+D55C	39-49	—	34-57	29-91	ᄒ+ᅡ+ᆫ
핟	U+D55F	—	35-53	—	47-58	ᄒ+ᅡ+ᆮ
할	U+D560	39-50	—	34-58	29-92	ᄒ+ᅡ+ᆯ
핡	U+D561	—	35-54	—	47-59	ᄒ+ᅡ+ᆰ
핣	U+D563	—	35-55	—	—	ᄒ+ᅡ+ᆲ
핤	U+D564	—	35-56	—	—	ᄒ+ᅡ+ᆳ
핥	U+D565	39-51	—	34-59	29-93	ᄒ+ᅡ+ᆴ
핧	U+D567	—	35-57	—	47-60	ᄒ+ᅡ+ᆶ
함	U+D568	39-52	—	34-60	29-94	ᄒ+ᅡ+ᆷ
합	U+D569	39-53	—	34-61	30-01	ᄒ+ᅡ+ᆸ
핫	U+D56B	39-54	—	34-62	30-02	ᄒ+ᅡ+ᆺ
핬	U+D56C	—	35-58	—	—	ᄒ+ᅡ+ᆻ
항	U+D56D	39-55	—	34-63	30-03	ᄒ+ᅡ+ᆼ
핮	U+D56E	—	35-59	—	—	ᄒ+ᅡ+ᆽ
핱	U+D571	—	35-60	—	—	ᄒ+ᅡ+ᇀ
해	U+D574	39-56	—	35-45	30-63	ᄒ+ᅢ+∅
핵	U+D575	39-57	—	35-46	30-64	ᄒ+ᅢ+ᆨ
핸	U+D578	39-58	—	35-47	30-65	ᄒ+ᅢ+ᆫ
핻	U+D57B	—	35-61	—	47-88	ᄒ+ᅢ+ᆮ
핼	U+D57C	39-59	—	35-48	30-66	ᄒ+ᅢ+ᆯ
햄	U+D584	39-60	—	35-49	30-67	ᄒ+ᅢ+ᆷ
햅	U+D585	39-61	—	35-50	30-68	ᄒ+ᅢ+ᆸ
햇	U+D587	39-62	—	35-51	30-69	ᄒ+ᅢ+ᆺ
했	U+D588	39-63	—	35-53	30-71	ᄒ+ᅢ+ᆻ
행	U+D589	39-64	—	35-52	30-70	ᄒ+ᅢ+ᆼ
햍	U+D58D	—	35-62	—	—	ᄒ+ᅢ+ᇀ
햐	U+D590	39-65	—	34-64	30-04	ᄒ+ᅣ+∅
햑	U+D591	—	35-63	—	47-61	ᄒ+ᅣ+ᆨ
햔	U+D594	—	35-64	—	—	ᄒ+ᅣ+ᆫ
햘	U+D598	—	35-65	—	—	ᄒ+ᅣ+ᆯ
햠	U+D5A0	—	35-66	—	—	ᄒ+ᅣ+ᆷ
햡	U+D5A1	—	35-67	—	—	ᄒ+ᅣ+ᆸ
햣	U+D5A3	—	35-68	—	—	ᄒ+ᅣ+ᆺ
향	U+D5A5	39-66	—	34-65	30-05	ᄒ+ᅣ+ᆼ
햫	U+D5AB	—	35-69	—	—	ᄒ+ᅣ+ᇂ
햬	U+D5AC	—	35-70	35-54	—	ᄒ+ᅤ+∅
헀	U+D5C0	—	35-71	—	—	ᄒ+ᅤ+ᆻ
허	U+D5C8	39-67	—	34-66	30-06	ᄒ+ᅥ+∅
헉	U+D5C9	39-68	—	34-67	30-07	ᄒ+ᅥ+ᆨ
헌	U+D5CC	39-69	—	34-68	30-08	ᄒ+ᅥ+ᆫ
헏	U+D5CF	—	35-72	—	47-62	ᄒ+ᅥ+ᆮ
헐	U+D5D0	39-70	—	34-69	30-09	ᄒ+ᅥ+ᆯ
헑	U+D5D1	—	35-73	—	47-63	ᄒ+ᅥ+ᆰ
헒	U+D5D2	39-71	—	34-70	30-10	ᄒ+ᅥ+ᆱ
헕	U+D5D5	—	—	34-71	—	ᄒ+ᅥ+ᆴ
헗	U+D5D7	—	35-74	34-72	47-64	ᄒ+ᅥ+ᆶ
험	U+D5D8	39-72	—	34-73	30-11	ᄒ+ᅥ+ᆷ
헙	U+D5D9	39-73	—	34-74	30-12	ᄒ+ᅥ+ᆸ
헛	U+D5DB	39-74	—	34-75	30-13	ᄒ+ᅥ+ᆺ
헜	U+D5DC	—	35-75	—	—	ᄒ+ᅥ+ᆻ
헝	U+D5DD	39-75	—	34-76	30-14	ᄒ+ᅥ+ᆼ
헡	U+D5E1	—	35-76	—	47-65	ᄒ+ᅥ+ᇀ
헢	U+D5E2	—	35-77	—	47-66	ᄒ+ᅥ+ᇁ
헤	U+D5E4	39-76	—	35-55	30-72	ᄒ+ᅦ+∅
헥	U+D5E5	39-77	—	35-56	30-73	ᄒ+ᅦ+ᆨ
헨	U+D5E8	39-78	—	35-57	30-74	ᄒ+ᅦ+ᆫ
헫	U+D5EB	—	35-78	—	47-89	ᄒ+ᅦ+ᆮ
헬	U+D5EC	39-79	—	35-58	30-75	ᄒ+ᅦ+ᆯ
헴	U+D5F4	39-80	—	35-59	30-76	ᄒ+ᅦ+ᆷ
헵	U+D5F5	39-81	—	35-60	30-77	ᄒ+ᅦ+ᆸ
헷	U+D5F7	39-82	—	35-61	30-78	ᄒ+ᅦ+ᆺ
헸	U+D5F8	—	35-79	35-63	30-80	ᄒ+ᅦ+ᆻ
헹	U+D5F9	39-83	—	35-62	30-79	ᄒ+ᅦ+ᆼ
헾	U+D5FE	—	35-80	—	47-90	ᄒ+ᅦ+ᇁ
혀	U+D600	39-84	—	34-77	30-15	ᄒ+ᅧ+∅
혁	U+D601	39-85	—	34-78	30-16	ᄒ+ᅧ+ᆨ
현	U+D604	39-86	—	34-79	30-17	ᄒ+ᅧ+ᆫ
혇	U+D607	—	35-81	—	47-67	ᄒ+ᅧ+ᆮ
혈	U+D608	39-87	—	34-80	30-18	ᄒ+ᅧ+ᆯ
혐	U+D610	39-88	—	34-81	30-19	ᄒ+ᅧ+ᆷ
협	U+D611	39-89	—	34-82	30-20	ᄒ+ᅧ+ᆸ
혓	U+D613	39-90	—	34-83	30-21	ᄒ+ᅧ+ᆺ
혔	U+D614	39-91	—	34-85	30-23	ᄒ+ᅧ+ᆻ
형	U+D615	39-92	—	34-84	30-22	ᄒ+ᅧ+ᆼ
혜	U+D61C	39-93	—	35-64	30-81	ᄒ+ᅨ+∅
혝	U+D61D	—	35-82	—	—	ᄒ+ᅨ+ᆨ
혠	U+D620	39-94	—	35-65	47-91	ᄒ+ᅨ+ᆫ
혤	U+D624	40-01	—	35-66	47-92	ᄒ+ᅨ+ᆯ
혬	U+D62C	—	35-83	—	47-93	ᄒ+ᅨ+ᆷ
혭	U+D62D	40-02	—	35-67	47-94	ᄒ+ᅨ+ᆸ
혯	U+D62F	—	35-84	—	48-01	ᄒ+ᅨ+ᆺ
혰	U+D630	—	35-85	—	—	ᄒ+ᅨ+ᆻ
혱	U+D631	—	35-86	—	48-02	ᄒ+ᅨ+ᆼ
호	U+D638	40-03	—	34-86	30-24	ᄒ+ᅩ+∅
혹	U+D639	40-04	—	34-87	30-25	ᄒ+ᅩ+ᆨ
혻	U+D63B	—	—	—	47-68	ᄒ+ᅩ+ᆪ
혼	U+D63C	40-05	—	34-88	30-26	ᄒ+ᅩ+ᆫ
혽	U+D63D	—	35-87	—	—	ᄒ+ᅩ+ᆬ
혿	U+D63F	—	35-88	34-89	47-69	ᄒ+ᅩ+ᆮ
홀	U+D640	40-06	—	34-90	30-27	ᄒ+ᅩ+ᆯ
홁	U+D641	—	35-89	—	—	ᄒ+ᅩ+ᆰ
홄	U+D644	—	35-90	—	—	ᄒ+ᅩ+ᆳ
홅	U+D645	40-07	—	34-91	47-70	ᄒ+ᅩ+ᆴ
홇	U+D647	—	35-91	—	—	ᄒ+ᅩ+ᆶ
홈	U+D648	40-08	—	34-92	30-28	ᄒ+ᅩ+ᆷ
홉	U+D649	40-09	—	34-93	30-29	ᄒ+ᅩ+ᆸ
홋	U+D64B	40-10	—	34-94	30-30	ᄒ+ᅩ+ᆺ
홍	U+D64D	40-11	—	35-01	30-31	ᄒ+ᅩ+ᆼ
홑	U+D651	40-12	—	35-02	30-32	ᄒ+ᅩ+ᇀ
화	U+D654	40-13	—	35-89	31-06	ᄒ+ᅪ+∅
확	U+D655	40-14	—	35-90	31-07	ᄒ+ᅪ+ᆨ
환	U+D658	40-15	—	35-91	31-08	ᄒ+ᅪ+ᆫ
홛	U+D65B	—	35-92	—	48-11	ᄒ+ᅪ+ᆮ
활	U+D65C	40-16	—	35-92	31-09	ᄒ+ᅪ+ᆯ
홠	U+D660	—	35-93	—	48-12	ᄒ+ᅪ+ᆳ
홤	U+D664	—	35-94	35-93	48-13	ᄒ+ᅪ+ᆷ
홥	U+D665	—	36-01	35-94	31-10	ᄒ+ᅪ+ᆸ
홦	U+D666	—	36-02	—	—	ᄒ+ᅪ+ᆹ
홧	U+D667	40-17	—	36-01	31-11	ᄒ+ᅪ+ᆺ
홨	U+D668	—	36-03	—	31-13	ᄒ+ᅪ+ᆻ
황	U+D669	40-18	—	36-02	31-12	ᄒ+ᅪ+ᆼ
홰	U+D670	40-19	—	36-09	31-17	ᄒ+ᅫ+∅
홱	U+D671	40-20	—	36-10	31-18	ᄒ+ᅫ+ᆨ
홴	U+D674	40-21	—	36-11	48-17	ᄒ+ᅫ+ᆫ
홷	U+D677	—	36-04	—	48-18	ᄒ+ᅫ+ᆮ
홸	U+D678	—	36-05	—	48-19	ᄒ+ᅫ+ᆯ
횀	U+D680	—	36-06	—	48-20	ᄒ+ᅫ+ᆷ
횁	U+D681	—	36-07	—	48-21	ᄒ+ᅫ+ᆸ
횃	U+D683	40-22	—	36-12	31-19	ᄒ+ᅫ+ᆺ
횄	U+D684	—	36-08	36-14	—	ᄒ+ᅫ+ᆻ
횅	U+D685	40-23	—	36-13	31-20	ᄒ+ᅫ+ᆼ
회	U+D68C	40-24	—	35-68	30-82	ᄒ+ᅬ+∅
획	U+D68D	40-25	—	35-69	30-83	ᄒ+ᅬ+ᆨ
횐	U+D690	40-26	—	35-70	48-03	ᄒ+ᅬ+ᆫ
횓	U+D693	—	36-09	—	48-04	ᄒ+ᅬ+ᆮ
횔	U+D694	40-27	—	35-71	48-05	ᄒ+ᅬ+ᆯ
횜	U+D69C	—	36-10	—	48-06	ᄒ+ᅬ+ᆷ
횝	U+D69D	40-28	—	35-72	30-84	ᄒ+ᅬ+ᆸ
횟	U+D69F	40-29	—	35-73	30-85	ᄒ+ᅬ+ᆺ
횡	U+D6A1	40-30	—	35-74	30-86	ᄒ+ᅬ+ᆼ
효	U+D6A8	40-31	—	35-03	30-33	ᄒ+ᅭ+∅
횩	U+D6A9	—	36-11	—	47-71	ᄒ+ᅭ+ᆨ
횬	U+D6AC	40-32	—	35-04	47-72	ᄒ+ᅭ+ᆫ
횯	U+D6AF	—	36-12	—	—	ᄒ+ᅭ+ᆮ
횰	U+D6B0	40-33	—	35-05	47-73	ᄒ+ᅭ+ᆯ
횸	U+D6B8	—	36-13	—	47-74	ᄒ+ᅭ+ᆷ
횹	U+D6B9	40-34	—	35-06	47-75	ᄒ+ᅭ+ᆸ
횻	U+D6BB	40-35	—	35-07	—	ᄒ+ᅭ+ᆺ
횽	U+D6BD	—	36-14	—	—	ᄒ+ᅭ+ᆼ
후	U+D6C4	40-36	—	35-08	30-34	ᄒ+ᅮ+∅
훅	U+D6C5	40-37	—	35-09	30-35	ᄒ+ᅮ+ᆨ
훈	U+D6C8	40-38	—	35-10	30-36	ᄒ+ᅮ+ᆫ
훋	U+D6CB	—	36-15	—	47-76	ᄒ+ᅮ+ᆮ
훌	U+D6CC	40-39	—	35-11	30-37	ᄒ+ᅮ+ᆯ
훍	U+D6CD	—	36-16	—	47-77	ᄒ+ᅮ+ᆰ
훎	U+D6CE	—	36-17	—	47-78	ᄒ+ᅮ+ᆱ
훑	U+D6D1	40-40	—	35-12	30-38	ᄒ+ᅮ+ᆴ
훒	U+D6D2	—	36-18	—	—	ᄒ+ᅮ+ᆵ
훓	U+D6D3	—	36-19	—	—	ᄒ+ᅮ+ᆶ
훔	U+D6D4	40-41	—	35-13	30-39	ᄒ+ᅮ+ᆷ
훕	U+D6D5	—	36-20	35-14	47-79	ᄒ+ᅮ+ᆸ
훗	U+D6D7	40-42	—	35-15	30-40	ᄒ+ᅮ+ᆺ
훙	U+D6D9	40-43	—	35-16	47-80	ᄒ+ᅮ+ᆼ
훜	U+D6DC	—	36-21	—	—	ᄒ+ᅮ+ᆿ
훝	U+D6DD	—	36-22	—	—	ᄒ+ᅮ+ᇀ
훠	U+D6E0	40-44	—	36-03	31-14	ᄒ+ᅯ+∅
훡	U+D6E1	—	36-23	36-04	48-14	ᄒ+ᅯ+ᆨ
훤	U+D6E4	40-45	—	36-05	31-15	ᄒ+ᅯ+ᆫ
훨	U+D6E8	40-46	—	36-06	31-16	ᄒ+ᅯ+ᆯ
훰	U+D6F0	40-47	—	36-07	—	ᄒ+ᅯ+ᆷ
훱	U+D6F1	—	36-24	—	—	ᄒ+ᅯ+ᆸ
훳	U+D6F3	—	36-25	—	48-15	ᄒ+ᅯ+ᆺ
훴	U+D6F4	—	36-26	—	—	ᄒ+ᅯ+ᆻ
훵	U+D6F5	40-48	—	36-08	48-16	ᄒ+ᅯ+ᆼ
훼	U+D6FC	40-49	—	36-15	31-21	ᄒ+ᅰ+∅
훽	U+D6FD	40-50	—	36-16	48-22	ᄒ+ᅰ+ᆨ
휀	U+D700	40-51	—	36-17	31-22	ᄒ+ᅰ+ᆫ
휃	U+D703	—	36-27	—	48-23	ᄒ+ᅰ+ᆮ
휄	U+D704	40-52	—	36-18	48-24	ᄒ+ᅰ+ᆯ
휌	U+D70C	—	36-28	—	48-25	ᄒ+ᅰ+ᆷ
휍	U+D70D	—	36-29	—	48-26	ᄒ+ᅰ+ᆸ
휏	U+D70F	—	36-30	—	48-27	ᄒ+ᅰ+ᆺ
휐	U+D710	—	36-31	—	48-28	ᄒ+ᅰ+ᆻ
휑	U+D711	40-53	—	36-19	31-23	ᄒ+ᅰ+ᆼ
휘	U+D718	40-54	—	35-75	30-87	ᄒ+ᅱ+∅
휙	U+D719	40-55	—	35-76	30-88	ᄒ+ᅱ+ᆨ
휜	U+D71C	40-56	—	35-77	30-89	ᄒ+ᅱ+ᆫ
휟	U+D71F	—	36-32	—	48-07	ᄒ+ᅱ+ᆮ
휠	U+D720	40-57	—	35-78	30-90	ᄒ+ᅱ+ᆯ
휨	U+D728	40-58	—	35-79	30-91	ᄒ+ᅱ+ᆷ
휩	U+D729	40-59	—	35-80	30-92	ᄒ+ᅱ+ᆸ
휫	U+D72B	40-60	—	35-81	48-08	ᄒ+ᅱ+ᆺ
휭	U+D72D	40-61	—	35-82	30-93	ᄒ+ᅱ+ᆼ
휴	U+D734	40-62	—	35-17	30-41	ᄒ+ᅲ+∅
휵	U+D735	40-63	—	35-18	47-81	ᄒ+ᅲ+ᆨ
휸	U+D738	40-64	—	35-19	47-82	ᄒ+ᅲ+ᆫ
휺	U+D73A	—	36-33	—	—	ᄒ+ᅲ+ᆭ
휻	U+D73B	—	36-34	—	—	ᄒ+ᅲ+ᆮ
휼	U+D73C	40-65	—	35-20	30-42	ᄒ+ᅲ+ᆯ
흃	U+D743	—	36-35	—	—	ᄒ+ᅲ+ᆶ
흄	U+D744	40-66	—	35-21	30-43	ᄒ+ᅲ+ᆷ
흅	U+D745	—	36-36	—	47-83	ᄒ+ᅲ+ᆸ
흇	U+D747	40-67	—	35-22	—	ᄒ+ᅲ+ᆺ
흉	U+D749	40-68	—	35-23	30-44	ᄒ+ᅲ+ᆼ
흍	U+D74D	—	36-37	—	—	ᄒ+ᅲ+ᇀ
흐	U+D750	40-69	—	35-24	30-45	ᄒ+ᅳ+∅
흑	U+D751	40-70	—	35-25	30-46	ᄒ+ᅳ+ᆨ
흔	U+D754	40-71	—	35-26	30-47	ᄒ+ᅳ+ᆫ
흕	U+D755	—	36-38	—	—	ᄒ+ᅳ+ᆬ
흖	U+D756	40-72	—	35-27	30-48	ᄒ+ᅳ+ᆭ
흗	U+D757	40-73	—	35-28	30-49	ᄒ+ᅳ+ᆮ
흘	U+D758	40-74	—	35-29	30-50	ᄒ+ᅳ+ᆯ
흙	U+D759	40-75	—	35-30	30-51	ᄒ+ᅳ+ᆰ
흝	U+D75D	—	36-39	35-31	—	ᄒ+ᅳ+ᆴ
흟	U+D75F	—	36-40	—	—	ᄒ+ᅳ+ᆶ
흠	U+D760	40-76	—	35-32	30-52	ᄒ+ᅳ+ᆷ
흡	U+D761	40-77	—	35-33	30-53	ᄒ+ᅳ+ᆸ
흣	U+D763	40-78	—	35-34	30-54	ᄒ+ᅳ+ᆺ
흥	U+D765	40-79	—	35-35	30-55	ᄒ+ᅳ+ᆼ
흨	U+D768	—	36-41	—	—	ᄒ+ᅳ+ᆿ
흩	U+D769	40-80	—	35-36	30-56	ᄒ+ᅳ+ᇀ
흪	U+D76A	—	36-42	—	—	ᄒ+ᅳ+ᇁ
흫	U+D76B	—	36-43	—	—	ᄒ+ᅳ+ᇂ
희	U+D76C	40-81	—	35-83	30-94	ᄒ+ᅴ+∅
흭	U+D76D	—	36-44	—	—	ᄒ+ᅴ+ᆨ
흰	U+D770	40-82	—	35-84	31-01	ᄒ+ᅴ+ᆫ
흳	U+D773	—	36-45	—	48-09	ᄒ+ᅴ+ᆮ
흴	U+D774	40-83	—	35-85	31-02	ᄒ+ᅴ+ᆯ
흼	U+D77C	40-84	—	35-86	31-03	ᄒ+ᅴ+ᆷ
흽	U+D77D	40-85	—	35-87	31-04	ᄒ+ᅴ+ᆸ
흿	U+D77F	—	36-46	—	48-10	ᄒ+ᅴ+ᆺ
힁	U+D781	40-86	—	35-88	31-05	ᄒ+ᅴ+ᆼ
히	U+D788	40-87	—	35-37	30-57	ᄒ+ᅵ+∅
힉	U+D789	40-88	—	35-38	47-84	ᄒ+ᅵ+ᆨ
힌	U+D78C	40-89	—	35-39	30-58	ᄒ+ᅵ+ᆫ
힏	U+D78F	—	36-47	—	47-85	ᄒ+ᅵ+ᆮ
힐	U+D790	40-90	—	35-40	30-59	ᄒ+ᅵ+ᆯ
힗	U+D797	—	36-48	—	47-86	ᄒ+ᅵ+ᆶ
힘	U+D798	40-91	—	35-41	30-60	ᄒ+ᅵ+ᆷ
힙	U+D799	40-92	—	35-42	30-61	ᄒ+ᅵ+ᆸ
힛	U+D79B	40-93	—	35-43	47-87	ᄒ+ᅵ+ᆺ
힜	U+D79C	—	36-49	—	—	ᄒ+ᅵ+ᆻ
힝	U+D79D	40-94	—	35-44	30-62	ᄒ+ᅵ+ᆼ
힠	U+D7A0	—	36-50	—	—	ᄒ+ᅵ+ᆿ

=== Statistics by jamo ===
Initial consonants

Jamo	Count
ㄱ	277
ㄲ	216
ㄴ	255
ㄷ	246
ㄸ	179
ㄹ	229
ㅁ	245
ㅂ	249
ㅃ	135
ㅅ	266
ㅆ	212
ㅇ	311
ㅈ	246
ㅉ	208
ㅊ	200
ㅋ	197
ㅌ	202
ㅍ	191
ㅎ	236
Total	4300

Vowels

Jamo	Count
ㅏ	344
ㅐ	230
ㅑ	177
ㅒ	63
ㅓ	299
ㅔ	224
ㅕ	240
ㅖ	154
ㅗ	285
ㅘ	175
ㅙ	128
ㅚ	186
ㅛ	157
ㅜ	251
ㅝ	181
ㅞ	174
ㅟ	175
ㅠ	162
ㅡ	265
ㅢ	154
ㅣ	276
Total	4300

Final consonants

Jamo	Count
(none)	399
ㄱ	357
ㄲ	41
ㄳ	23
ㄴ	376
ㄵ	10
ㄶ	28
ㄷ	303
ㄹ	367
ㄺ	68
ㄻ	76
ㄼ	39
ㄽ	56
ㄾ	5
ㄿ	14
ㅀ	45
ㅁ	360
ㅂ	356
ㅄ	15
ㅅ	355
ㅆ	204
ㅇ	366
ㅈ	73
ㅊ	63
ㅋ	49
ㅌ	97
ㅍ	86
ㅎ	69
Total	4300
