= List of jōyō kanji =

The jōyō kanji (常用漢字, Japanese pronunciation: [dʑoːjoːkaꜜɲdʑi]; lit. 'regular-use kanji') system of representing written Japanese currently consists of 2,136 characters.

== List of characters ==
- For brevity, only one English translation is given per kanji.
- The "Grade" column specifies the grade in which the kanji is taught in Elementary schools in Japan. Grade "S" means that it is taught in secondary school.
- The list is sorted by Japanese reading (on'yomi in katakana, then kun'yomi in hiragana), in accordance with the ordering in the official Jōyō table.
- This list does not include characters that were present in older versions of the list but have since been removed (勺, 銑, 脹, 錘, 匁).
- Hyphens in the kun'yomi readings separate kanji from their okurigana.
- The "New" column attempts to reflect the official glyph shapes as closely as possible. This requires using the characters 𠮟, 塡, 剝, 頰 which are outside of Japan's basic character set, JIS X 0208 (one of them is also outside the Unicode BMP). In practice, these characters are usually replaced by the characters 叱, 填, 剥, 頬, which are present in JIS X 0208.
- The "Old" column reflects the official kyūjitai specified in the standard jōyō table; it does not include unofficial, extended, or Asahi characters.
- The readings presented here are those noted in the official Jōyō table. Special readings and uncommon readings are indicated in brackets. Other readings (generally less common, such as the nanori) may also exist.

#	New (Shinjitai)	Old (Kyūjitai)	Radical	Strokes	Grade	Year added	English meaning	Readings
1	亜	亞	二	7	S		sub-, Asia	ア a
2	哀		口	9	S		pathetic	アイ、あわ-れ、あわ-れむ ai, awa-re, awa-remu
3	挨		手	10	S	2010	push open	アイ ai
4	愛		心	13	4		love	アイ ai
5	曖		日	17	S	2010	not clear	アイ ai
6	悪	惡	心	11	3		bad	アク、オ、わる-い aku, o, waru-i
7	握		手	12	S		grip	アク、にぎ-る aku, nigi-ru
8	圧	壓	土	5	5		pressure	アツ atsu
9	扱		手	6	S		handle	あつか-う atsuka-u
10	宛		宀	8	S	2010	allocate	あ-てる a-teru
11	嵐		山	12	S	2010	storm	あらし arashi
12	安		宀	6	3		cheap	アン、やす-い an, yasu-i
13	案		木	10	4		plan	アン an
14	暗		日	13	3		dark	アン、くら-い an, kura-i
15	以		人	5	4		by means of	イ i
16	衣		衣	6	4		clothes	イ、ころも i, koromo
17	位		人	7	4		rank	イ、くらい i, kurai
18	囲	圍	囗	7	5		surround	イ、かこ-む、かこ-う i, kako-mu, kako-u
19	医	醫	酉	7	3		doctor	イ i
20	依		人	8	S		reliant	イ、（エ） i, (e)
21	委		女	8	3		committee	イ、ゆだ-ねる i, yuda-neru
22	威		女	9	S		intimidate	イ i
23	為	爲	爪	9	S		do	イ i
24	畏		田	9	S	2010	fear	イ、おそ-れる i, oso-reru
25	胃		肉	9	6		stomach	イ i
26	尉		寸	11	S		military officer	イ i
27	異		田	11	6		uncommon	イ、こと i, koto
28	移		禾	11	5		shift	イ、うつ-る、うつ-す i, utsu-ru, utsu-su
29	萎		艸	11	S	2010	wither	イ、な-える i, na-eru
30	偉		人	12	S		admirable	イ、えら-い i, era-i
31	椅		木	12	S	2010	chair	イ i
32	彙		彐	13	S	2010	same kind	イ i
33	意		心	13	3		idea	イ i
34	違		辵	13	S		differ	イ、ちが-う、ちが-える i, chiga-u, chiga-eru
35	維		糸	14	S		fiber	イ i
36	慰		心	15	S		consolation	イ、なぐさ-める、なぐさ-む i, nagusa-meru, nagusa-mu
37	遺		辵	15	6		bequeath	イ、（ユイ） i, (yui)
38	緯		糸	16	S		horizontal	イ i
39	域		土	11	6		range	イキ iki
40	育		肉	8	3		nurture	イク、そだ-つ、そだ-てる、はぐく-む iku, soda-tsu, soda-teru, haguku-mu
41	一		一	1	1		one	イチ、イツ、ひと、ひと-つ ichi, itsu, hito, hito-tsu
42	壱	壹	士	7	S		one (falsification prevention)	イチ ichi
43	逸	逸	辵	11	S		deviate	イツ itsu
44	茨		艸	9	4	2010	thorn	（いばら） (ibara)
45	芋		艸	6	S		potato	いも imo
46	引		弓	4	2		pull	イン、ひ-く、ひ-ける in, hi-ku, hi-keru
47	印		卩	6	4		mark	イン、しるし in, shirushi
48	因		囗	6	5		cause	イン、よ-る in, yo-ru
49	咽		口	9	S	2010	throat	イン in
50	姻		女	9	S		matrimony	イン in
51	員		口	10	3		member	イン in
52	院		阜	10	3		institution	イン in
53	淫		水	11	S	2010	lewdness	イン、みだ-ら in, mida-ra
54	陰		阜	11	S		shade	イン、かげ、かげ-る in, kage, kage-ru
55	飲		食	12	3		drink	イン、の-む in, no-mu
56	隠	隱	阜	14	S		conceal	イン、かく-す、かく-れる in, kaku-su, kaku-reru
57	韻		音	19	S		rhyme	イン in
58	右		口	5	1		right (direction)	ウ、ユウ、みぎ u, yū, migi
59	宇		宀	6	6		eaves	ウ u
60	羽		羽	6	2		feather	ウ、は、はね u, ha, hane
61	雨		雨	8	1		rain	ウ、あめ、（あま） u, ame, (ama)
62	唄		口	10	S	2010	songs with samisen	（うた） (uta)
63	鬱		鬯	29	S	2010	depression	ウツ utsu
64	畝		田	10	S		furrow	うね une
65	浦		水	10	S		bay	うら ura
66	運		辵	12	3		carry	ウン、はこ-ぶ un, hako-bu
67	雲		雨	12	2		cloud	ウン、くも un, kumo
68	永		水	5	5		eternity	エイ、なが-い ei, naga-i
69	泳		水	8	3		swim	エイ、およ-ぐ ei, oyo-gu
70	英		艸	8	4		England	エイ ei
71	映		日	9	6		reflect	エイ、うつ-る、うつ-す、は-える ei, utsu-ru, utsu-su, ha-eru
72	栄	榮	木	9	4		prosperity	エイ、さか-える、は-え、は-える ei, saka-eru, ha-e, ha-eru
73	営	營	火	12	5		manage	エイ、いとな-む ei, itona-mu
74	詠		言	12	S		recitation	エイ、よ-む ei, yo-mu
75	影		彡	15	S		shadow	エイ、かげ ei, kage
76	鋭		金	15	S		pointed	エイ、するど-い ei, surudo-i
77	衛	衞	行	16	5		defense	エイ ei
78	易		日	8	5		easy	エキ、イ、やさ-しい eki, i, yasa-shii
79	疫		疒	9	S		epidemic	エキ、（ヤク） eki, (yaku)
80	益		皿	10	5		benefit	エキ、（ヤク） eki, (yaku)
81	液		水	11	5		fluid	エキ eki
82	駅	驛	馬	14	3		station	エキ eki
83	悦		心	10	S		ecstasy	エツ etsu
84	越		走	12	S		cross over	エツ、こ-す、こ-える etsu, ko-su, ko-eru
85	謁	謁	言	15	S		audience	エツ etsu
86	閲		門	15	S		review	エツ etsu
87	円	圓	囗	4	1		round, yen	エン、まる-い en, maru-i
88	延		廴	8	6		prolong	エン、の-びる、の-べる、の-ばす en, no-biru, no-beru, no-basu
89	沿		水	8	6		run alongside	エン、そ-う en, so-u
90	炎		火	8	S		inflammation	エン、ほのお en, honoo
91	怨		心	9	S	2010	grudge	エン、オン en, on
92	宴		宀	10	S		banquet	エン en
93	媛		女	12	4	2010	princess, beautiful woman	エン en
94	援		手	12	S		aid	エン en
95	園		囗	13	2		garden	エン、その en, sono
96	煙		火	13	S		smoke	エン、けむ-る、けむり、けむ-い en, kemu-ru, kemuri, kemu-i
97	猿		犬	13	S	1981	monkey	エン、さる en, saru
98	遠		辵	13	2		far	エン、（オン）、とお-い en, (on), too-i
99	鉛		金	13	S		lead	エン、なまり en, namari
100	塩	鹽	鹵	13	4		salt	エン、しお en, shio
101	演		水	14	5		perform	エン en
102	縁	緣	糸	15	S		affinity	エン、ふち en, fuchi
103	艶	艷	色	19	S	2010	glossy	エン、つや en, tsuya
104	汚		水	6	S		dirty	オ、けが-す、けが-れる、けが-らわしい、よご-す、よご-れる、きたな-い o, kega-su, kega-reru, kega-rawashii, yogo-su, yogo-reru, kitana-i
105	王		玉	4	1		king	オウ ō
106	凹		凵	5	S	1981	concave	オウ ō
107	央		大	5	3		center	オウ ō
108	応	應	心	7	5		respond	オウ、こた-える ō, kota-eru
109	往		彳	8	5		outward journey	オウ ō
110	押		手	8	S		pushed	オウ、お-す、お-さえる ō, o-su, o-saeru
111	旺		日	8	S	2010	flourishing	オウ ō
112	欧	歐	欠	8	S		Europe	オウ ō
113	殴	毆	殳	8	S		assault	オウ、なぐ-る ō, nagu-ru
114	桜	櫻	木	10	5		cherry tree	オウ、さくら ō, sakura
115	翁		羽	10	S		venerable old man	オウ ō
116	奥	奧	大	12	S		heart	オウ、おく ō, oku
117	横	橫	木	15	3		side	オウ、よこ ō, yoko
118	岡		山	8	4	2010	hill	（おか） (oka)
119	屋		尸	9	3		roof	オク、や oku, ya
120	億		人	15	4		hundred million	オク oku
121	憶		心	16	S		recollection	オク oku
122	臆		肉	17	S	2010	timidity	オク oku
123	虞		虍	13	S		uneasiness	おそれ osore
124	乙		乙	1	S		the latter	オツ otsu
125	俺		人	10	S	2010	I, we, myself	おれ ore
126	卸		卩	9	S		wholesale	おろ-す、おろし oro-su, oroshi
127	音		音	9	1		sound	オン、イン、おと、ね on, in, oto, ne
128	恩		心	10	6		grace	オン on
129	温	溫	水	12	3		warm	オン、あたた-か、あたた-かい、あたた-まる、あたた-める on, atata-ka, atata-kai, atata-maru, atata-meru
130	穏	穩	禾	16	S		calm	オン、おだ-やか on, oda-yaka
131	下		一	3	1		below	カ、ゲ、した、しも、もと、さ-げる、さ-がる、くだ-る、くだ-す、くだ-さる、お-ろす、お-りる ka, ge, shita, shimo, moto, sa-geru, sa-garu, kuda-ru, kuda-su, kuda-saru, o-rosu, o-riru
132	化		匕	4	3		change	カ、ケ、ば-ける、ば-かす ka, ke, ba-keru, ba-kasu
133	火		火	4	1		fire	カ、ひ、（ほ） ka, hi, (ho)
134	加		力	5	4		add	カ、くわ-える、くわ-わる ka, kuwa-eru, kuwa-waru
135	可		口	5	5		possible	カ ka
136	仮	假	人	6	5		temporary	カ、（ケ）、かり ka, (ke), kari
137	何		人	7	2		what	カ、なに、（なん） ka, nani, (nan)
138	花		艸	7	1		flower	カ、はな ka, hana
139	佳		人	8	S		excellent	カ ka
140	価	價	人	8	5		value	カ、あたい ka, atai
141	果		木	8	4		fruit	カ、は-たす、は-てる、は-て ka, ha-tasu, ha-teru, ha-te
142	河		水	8	5		river	カ、かわ ka, kawa
143	苛		艸	8	S	2010	torment	カ ka
144	科		禾	9	2		section	カ ka
145	架		木	9	S		rack	カ、か-ける、か-かる ka, ka-keru, ka-karu
146	夏		夊	10	2		summer	カ、（ゲ）、なつ ka, (ge), natsu
147	家		宀	10	2		house	カ、ケ、いえ、や ka, ke, ie, ya
148	荷		艸	10	3		luggage	カ、に ka, ni
149	華		艸	10	S		splendor	カ、（ケ）、はな ka, (ke), hana
150	菓		艸	11	S		confectionery	カ ka
151	貨		貝	11	4		freight	カ ka
152	渦		水	12	S	1981	whirlpool	カ、うず ka, uzu
153	過		辵	12	5		go beyond	カ、す-ぎる、す-ごす、あやま-つ、あやま-ち ka, su-giru, su-gosu, ayama-tsu, ayama-chi
154	嫁		女	13	S		marry into	カ、よめ、とつ-ぐ ka, yome, totsu-gu
155	暇		日	13	S		spare time	カ、ひま ka, hima
156	禍	禍	示	13	S		calamity	カ ka
157	靴		革	13	S	1981	shoes	カ、くつ ka, kutsu
158	寡		宀	14	S		widow	カ ka
159	歌		欠	14	2		song	カ、うた、うた-う ka, uta, uta-u
160	箇		竹	14	S		counters for things	カ ka
161	稼		禾	15	S	1981	earnings	カ、かせ-ぐ ka, kase-gu
162	課		言	15	4		section	カ ka
163	蚊		虫	10	S		mosquito	か ka
164	牙		牙	4	S	2010	tusk	ガ、（ゲ）、きば ga, (ge), kiba
165	瓦		瓦	5	S	2010	tile	ガ、かわら ga, kawara
166	我		戈	7	6		ego, I, we	ガ、われ、わ ga, ware, wa
167	画	畫	田	8	2		tableau	ガ、カク ga, kaku
168	芽		艸	8	4		bud	ガ、め ga, me
169	賀		貝	12	4		congratulations	ガ ga
170	雅		隹	13	S		gracious	ガ ga
171	餓		食	15	S		starve	ガ ga
172	介		人	4	S		jammed in	カイ kai
173	回		囗	6	2		times	カイ、（エ）、まわ-る、まわ-す kai, (e), mawa-ru, mawa-su
174	灰		火	6	6		ashes	カイ、はい kai, hai
175	会	會	曰	6	2		association	カイ、エ、あ-う kai, e, a-u
176	快		心	7	5		cheerful	カイ、こころよ-い kai, kokoroyo-i
177	戒		戈	7	S		commandment	カイ、いまし-める kai, imashi-meru
178	改		攴	7	4		reformation	カイ、あらた-める、あらた-まる kai, arata-meru, arata-maru
179	怪		心	8	S		suspicious	カイ、あや-しい、あや-しむ kai, aya-shii, aya-shimu
180	拐		手	8	S	1981	kidnap	カイ kai
181	悔	悔	心	9	S		repent	カイ、く-いる、く-やむ、くや-しい kai, ku-iru, ku-yamu, kuya-shii
182	海	海	水	9	2		sea	カイ、うみ kai, umi
183	界		田	9	3		world	カイ kai
184	皆		白	9	S		all	カイ、みな kai, mina
185	械		木	11	4		contraption	カイ kai
186	絵	繪	糸	12	2		picture	カイ、エ kai, e
187	開		門	12	3		open	カイ、ひら-く、ひら-ける、あ-く、あ-ける kai, hira-ku, hira-keru, a-ku, a-keru
188	階		阜	12	3		floor of a building	カイ kai
189	塊		土	13	S		clod	カイ、かたまり kai, katamari
190	楷		木	13	S	2010	square character style	カイ kai
191	解		角	13	5		untie	カイ、ゲ、と-く、と-かす、と-ける kai, ge, to-ku, to-kasu, to-keru
192	潰		水	15	S	2010	crush	カイ、つぶ-す、つぶ-れる kai, tsubu-su, tsubu-reru
193	壊	壞	土	16	S		demolition	カイ、こわ-す、こわ-れる kai, kowa-su, kowa-reru
194	懐	懷	心	16	S		pocket	カイ、ふところ、なつ-かしい、なつ-かしむ、なつ-く、なつ-ける kai, futokoro, natsu-kashii, natsu-kashimu, natsu-ku, natsu-keru
195	諧		言	16	S	2010	harmony	カイ kai
196	貝		貝	7	1		shellfish	かい kai
197	外		夕	5	2		outside	ガイ、ゲ、そと、ほか、はず-す、はず-れる gai, ge, soto, hoka, hazu-su, hazu-reru
198	劾		力	8	S		censure	ガイ gai
199	害		宀	10	4		harm	ガイ gai
200	崖		山	11	S	2010	cliff	ガイ、がけ gai, gake
201	涯		水	11	S	1981	horizon	ガイ gai
202	街		行	12	4		street	ガイ、（カイ）、まち gai, (kai), machi
203	慨	慨	心	13	S		rue	ガイ gai
204	蓋		艸	13	S	2010	cover	ガイ、ふた gai, futa
205	該		言	13	S		above-stated	ガイ gai
206	概	槪	木	14	S		outline	ガイ gai
207	骸		骨	16	S	2010	dead remains	ガイ gai
208	垣		土	9	S	1981	hedge	かき kaki
209	柿		木	9	S	2010	persimmon	かき kaki
210	各		口	6	4		each	カク、おのおの kaku, onoono
211	角		角	7	2		angle	カク、かど、つの kaku, kado, tsuno
212	拡	擴	手	8	6		broaden	カク kaku
213	革		革	9	6		leather	カク、かわ kaku, kawa
214	格		木	10	5		status	カク、（コウ） kaku, (kō)
215	核		木	10	S		nucleus	カク kaku
216	殻	殼	殳	11	S	1981	husk	カク、から kaku, kara
217	郭		邑	11	S		enclosure	カク kaku
218	覚	覺	見	12	4		memorize	カク、おぼ-える、さ-ます、さ-める kaku, obo-eru, sa-masu, sa-meru
219	較		車	13	S		contrast	カク kaku
220	隔		阜	13	S		isolate	カク、へだ-てる、へだ-たる kaku, heda-teru, heda-taru
221	閣		門	14	6		tall	カク kaku
222	確		石	15	5		certain	カク、たし-か、たし-かめる kaku, tashi-ka, tashi-kameru
223	獲		犬	16	S		seize	カク、え-る kaku, e-ru
224	嚇		口	17	S		menacing	カク kaku
225	穫		禾	18	S		harvest	カク kaku
226	学	學	子	8	1		study	ガク、まな-ぶ gaku, mana-bu
227	岳	嶽	山	8	S		point	ガク、たけ gaku, take
228	楽	樂	木	13	2		pleasure	ガク、ラク、たの-しい、たの-しむ gaku, raku, tano-shii, tano-shimu
229	額		頁	18	5		amount	ガク、ひたい gaku, hitai
230	顎		頁	18	S	2010	jaw	ガク、あご gaku, ago
231	掛		手	11	S		hang	か-ける、か-かる、かかり ka-keru, ka-karu, kakari
232	潟		水	15	4	1981	lagoon	かた kata
233	括		手	9	S		fasten	カツ katsu
234	活		水	9	2		active	カツ katsu
235	喝	喝	口	11	S	1981	hoarse	カツ katsu
236	渇	渴	水	11	S		thirst	カツ、かわ-く katsu, kawa-ku
237	割		刀	12	6		divide	カツ、わ-る、わり、わ-れる、さ-く katsu, wa-ru, wari, wa-reru, sa-ku
238	葛		艸	12	S	2010	arrowroot	カツ、くず katsu, kuzu
239	滑		水	13	S		slippery	カツ、コツ、すべ-る、なめ-らか katsu, kotsu, sube-ru, name-raka
240	褐	褐	衣	13	S	1981	brown	カツ katsu
241	轄		車	17	S		control	カツ katsu
242	且		一	5	S		moreover	か-つ ka-tsu
243	株		木	10	6		stocks	かぶ kabu
244	釜		金	10	S	2010	kettle	かま kama
245	鎌		金	18	S	2010	sickle	かま kama
246	刈		刀	4	S		reap	か-る ka-ru
247	干		干	3	6		dry	カン、ほ-す、ひ-る kan, ho-su, hi-ru
248	刊		刀	5	5		publish	カン kan
249	甘		甘	5	S		sweet	カン、あま-い、あま-える、あま-やかす kan, ama-i, ama-eru, ama-yakasu
250	汗		水	6	S		sweat	カン、あせ kan, ase
251	缶	罐	缶	6	S	1981	tin can	カン kan
252	完		宀	7	4		perfect	カン kan
253	肝		肉	7	S		liver	カン、きも kan, kimo
254	官		宀	8	4		government official	カン kan
255	冠		冖	9	S		crown	カン、かんむり kan, kanmuri
256	巻	卷	卩	9	6		scroll	カン、ま-く、まき kan, ma-ku, maki
257	看		目	9	6		watch over	カン kan
258	陥	陷	阜	10	S		collapse	カン、おちい-る、おとしい-れる kan, ochii-ru, otoshii-reru
259	乾		乙	11	S		dry	カン、かわ-く、かわ-かす kan, kawa-ku, kawa-kasu
260	勘		力	11	S		intuition	カン kan
261	患		心	11	S		afflicted	カン、わずら-う kan, wazura-u
262	貫		貝	11	S		pierce	カン、つらぬ-く kan, tsuranu-ku
263	寒		宀	12	3		cold	カン、さむ-い kan, samu-i
264	喚		口	12	S		yell	カン kan
265	堪		土	12	S		withstand	カン、た-える kan, ta-eru
266	換		手	12	S		interchange	カン、か-える、か-わる kan, ka-eru, ka-waru
267	敢		攴	12	S		daring	カン kan
268	棺		木	12	S		coffin	カン kan
269	款		欠	12	S		goodwill	カン kan
270	間		門	12	2		interval	カン、ケン、あいだ、ま kan, ken, aida, ma
271	閑		門	12	S		leisure	カン kan
272	勧	勸	力	13	S		persuade	カン、すす-める kan, susu-meru
273	寛	寬	宀	13	S		tolerant	カン kan
274	幹		干	13	5		tree-trunk	カン、みき kan, miki
275	感		心	13	3		feeling	カン kan
276	漢	漢	水	13	3		China	カン kan
277	慣		心	14	5		accustomed	カン、な-れる、な-らす kan, na-reru, na-rasu
278	管		竹	14	4		pipe	カン、くだ kan, kuda
279	関	關	門	14	4		related	カン、せき、かか-わる kan, seki, kaka-waru
280	歓	歡	欠	15	S		delight	カン kan
281	監		皿	15	S		oversee	カン kan
282	緩		糸	15	S		slacken	カン、ゆる-い、ゆる-やか、ゆる-む、ゆる-める kan, yuru-i, yuru-yaka, yuru-mu, yuru-meru
283	憾		心	16	S		remorse	カン kan
284	還		辵	16	S		send back	カン kan
285	館		食	16	3		public building	カン、やかた kan, yakata
286	環		玉	17	S		ring	カン kan
287	簡		竹	18	6		simplicity	カン kan
288	観	觀	見	18	4		observe	カン kan
289	韓		韋	18	S	2010	Korea	カン kan
290	艦		舟	21	S		warship	カン kan
291	鑑		金	23	S		specimen	カン、かんが-みる kan, kanga-miru
292	丸		丶	3	2		circle	ガン、まる、まる-い、まる-める gan, maru, maru-i, maru-meru
293	含		口	7	S		include	ガン、ふく-む、ふく-める gan, fuku-mu, fuku-meru
294	岸		山	8	3		beach	ガン、きし gan, kishi
295	岩		山	8	2		boulder	ガン、いわ gan, iwa
296	玩		玉	8	S	2010	trifle with	ガン gan
297	眼		目	11	5		eyeball	ガン、（ゲン）、まなこ gan, (gen), manako
298	頑		頁	13	S	1981	stubborn	ガン gan
299	顔		頁	18	2		face	ガン、かお gan, kao
300	願		頁	19	4		request	ガン、ねが-う gan, nega-u
301	企		人	6	S		plan	キ、くわだ-てる ki, kuwada-teru
302	伎		人	6	S	2010	deed	キ ki
303	危		卩	6	6		dangerous	キ、あぶ-ない、あや-うい、あや-ぶむ ki, abu-nai, aya-ui, aya-bumu
304	机		木	6	6		desk	キ、つくえ ki, tsukue
305	気	氣	气	6	1		feeling	キ、ケ ki, ke
306	岐		山	7	4		branch off	キ ki
307	希		巾	7	4		hope	キ ki
308	忌		心	7	S		mourning	キ、い-む、い-まわしい ki, i-mu, i-mawashii
309	汽		水	7	2		steam	キ ki
310	奇		大	8	S		strange	キ ki
311	祈	祈	示	8	S		pray	キ、いの-る ki, ino-ru
312	季		子	8	4		seasons	キ ki
313	紀		糸	9	5		chronicle	キ ki
314	軌		車	9	S		rut	キ ki
315	既	既	无	10	S		previously	キ、すで-に ki, sude-ni
316	記		言	10	2		write down	キ、しる-す ki, shiru-su
317	起		走	10	3		wake up	キ、お-きる、お-こる、お-こす ki, o-kiru, o-koru, o-kosu
318	飢		食	10	S		hungry	キ、う-える ki, u-eru
319	鬼		鬼	10	S		ghost	キ、おに ki, oni
320	帰	歸	止	10	2		return	キ、かえ-る、かえ-す ki, kae-ru, kae-su
321	基		土	11	5		foundation	キ、もと、もとい ki, moto, motoi
322	寄		宀	11	5		approach	キ、よ-る、よ-せる ki, yo-ru, yo-seru
323	規		見	11	5		rule	キ ki
324	亀	龜	龜	11	S	2010	turtle	キ、かめ ki, kame
325	喜		口	12	5		rejoice	キ、よろこ-ぶ ki, yoroko-bu
326	幾		幺	12	S		how many	キ、いく ki, iku
327	揮		手	12	6		brandish	キ ki
328	期		月	12	3		period of time	キ、（ゴ） ki, (go)
329	棋		木	12	S		chess piece	キ ki
330	貴		貝	12	6		precious	キ、たっと-い、とうと-い、たっと-ぶ、とうと-ぶ ki, tatto-i, tōto-i, tatto-bu, tōto-bu
331	棄		木	13	S		abandon	キ ki
332	毀		殳	13	S	2010	destroy	キ ki
333	旗		方	14	4		national flag	キ、はた ki, hata
334	器	器	口	15	4		container	キ、うつわ ki, utsuwa
335	畿		田	15	S	2010	capital	キ ki
336	輝		車	15	S		radiance	キ、かがや-く ki, kagaya-ku
337	機		木	16	4		machine	キ、はた ki, hata
338	騎		馬	18	S		equestrian	キ ki
339	技		手	7	5		skill	ギ、わざ gi, waza
340	宜		宀	8	S		best regards	ギ gi
341	偽	僞	人	11	S		falsehood	ギ、いつわ-る、にせ gi, itsuwa-ru, nise
342	欺		欠	12	S		deceit	ギ、あざむ-く gi, azamu-ku
343	義		羊	13	5		righteousness	ギ gi
344	疑		疋	14	6		doubt	ギ、うたが-う gi, utaga-u
345	儀		人	15	S		ceremony	ギ gi
346	戯	戲	戈	15	S		frolic	ギ、たわむ-れる gi, tawamu-reru
347	擬		手	17	S		mimic	ギ gi
348	犠	犧	牛	17	S		sacrifice	ギ gi
349	議		言	20	4		deliberation	ギ gi
350	菊		艸	11	S		chrysanthemum	キク kiku
351	吉		口	6	S		good luck	キチ、キツ kichi, kitsu
352	喫		口	12	S		consume	キツ kitsu
353	詰		言	13	S		packed	キツ、つ-める、つ-まる、つ-む kitsu, tsu-meru, tsu-maru, tsu-mu
354	却		卩	7	S		instead	キャク kyaku
355	客		宀	9	3		guest	キャク、カク kyaku, kaku
356	脚		肉	11	S		leg	キャク、（キャ）、あし kyaku, (kya), ashi
357	逆		辵	9	5		inverted	ギャク、さか、さか-らう gyaku, saka, saka-rau
358	虐		虍	9	S		tyrannize	ギャク、しいた-げる gyaku, shiita-geru
359	九		乙	2	1		nine	キュウ、ク、ここの、ここの-つ kyū, ku, kokono, kokono-tsu
360	久		丿	3	5		long time	キュウ、（ク）、ひさ-しい kyū, (ku), hisa-shii
361	及		又	3	S		reach out	キュウ、およ-ぶ、およ-び、およ-ぼす kyū, oyo-bu, oyo-bi, oyo-bosu
362	弓		弓	3	2		bow (archery, violin)	キュウ、ゆみ kyū, yumi
363	丘		一	5	S		hill	キュウ、おか kyū, oka
364	旧	舊	臼	5	5		old times	キュウ kyū
365	休		人	6	1		rest	キュウ、やす-む、やす-まる、やす-める kyū, yasu-mu, yasu-maru, yasu-meru
366	吸		口	6	6		suck	キュウ、す-う kyū, su-u
367	朽		木	6	S		decay	キュウ、く-ちる kyū, ku-chiru
368	臼		臼	6	S	2010	mortar	キュウ、うす kyū, usu
369	求		水	7	4		request	キュウ、もと-める kyū, moto-meru
370	究		穴	7	3		research	キュウ、きわ-める kyū, kiwa-meru
371	泣		水	8	4		cry	キュウ、な-く kyū, na-ku
372	急		心	9	3		hurry	キュウ、いそ-ぐ kyū, iso-gu
373	級		糸	9	3		rank	キュウ kyū
374	糾		糸	9	S		twist	キュウ kyū
375	宮		宀	10	3		Shinto shrine	キュウ、グウ、（ク）、みや kyū, gū, (ku), miya
376	救		攴	11	5		salvation	キュウ、すく-う kyū, suku-u
377	球		玉	11	3		sphere	キュウ、たま kyū, tama
378	給		糸	12	4		salary	キュウ kyū
379	嗅		口	13	S	2010	smell	キュウ、か-ぐ kyū, ka-gu
380	窮		穴	15	S		hard up	キュウ、きわ-める、きわ-まる kyū, kiwa-meru, kiwa-maru
381	牛		牛	4	2		cow	ギュウ、うし gyū, ushi
382	去		厶	5	3		leave	キョ、コ、さ-る kyo, ko, sa-ru
383	巨		工	4	S		gigantic	キョ kyo
384	居		尸	8	5		reside	キョ、い-る kyo, i-ru
385	拒		手	8	S		repel	キョ、こば-む kyo, koba-mu
386	拠	據	手	8	S		foothold	キョ、コ kyo, ko
387	挙	擧	手	10	4		raise	キョ、あ-げる、あ-がる kyo, a-geru, a-garu
388	虚	虛	虍	11	S		void	キョ、（コ） kyo, (ko)
389	許		言	11	5		permit	キョ、ゆる-す kyo, yuru-su
390	距		足	12	S		long-distance	キョ kyo
391	魚		魚	11	2		fish	ギョ、うお、さかな gyo, uo, sakana
392	御		彳	12	S		honorable	ギョ、ゴ、おん gyo, go, on
393	漁		水	14	4		fishing	ギョ、リョウ gyo, ryō
394	凶		凵	4	S		villain	キョウ kyō
395	共		八	6	4		together	キョウ、とも kyō, tomo
396	叫		口	6	S		shout	キョウ、さけ-ぶ kyō, sake-bu
397	狂		犬	7	S		lunatic	キョウ、くる-う、くる-おしい kyō, kuru-u, kuru-oshii
398	京		亠	8	2		capital	キョウ、ケイ kyō, kei
399	享		亠	8	S		receive	キョウ kyō
400	供		人	8	6		offer	キョウ、（ク）、そな-える、とも kyō, (ku), sona-eru, tomo
401	協		十	8	4		cooperation	キョウ kyō
402	況		水	8	S		condition	キョウ kyō
403	峡	峽	山	9	S		gorge	キョウ kyō
404	挟	挾	手	9	S	1981	pinch	キョウ、はさ-む、はさ-まる kyō, hasa-mu, hasa-maru
405	狭	狹	犬	9	S		cramped	キョウ、せま-い、せば-める、せば-まる kyō, sema-i, seba-meru, seba-maru
406	恐		心	10	S		fear	キョウ、おそ-れる、おそ-ろしい kyō, oso-reru, oso-roshii
407	恭		心	10	S		respect	キョウ、うやうや-しい kyō, uyauya-shii
408	胸		肉	10	6		bosom	キョウ、むね、（むな） kyō, mune, (muna)
409	脅		肉	10	S		threaten	キョウ、おびや-かす、おど-す、おど-かす kyō, obiya-kasu, odo-su, odo-kasu
410	強		弓	11	2		strong	キョウ、ゴウ、つよ-い、つよ-まる、つよ-める、し-いる kyō, gō, tsuyo-i, tsuyo-maru, tsuyo-meru, shi-iru
411	教		攴	11	2		teach	キョウ、おし-える、おそ-わる kyō, oshi-eru, oso-waru
412	郷	鄕	邑	11	6		home town	キョウ、ゴウ kyō, gō
413	境		土	14	5		boundary	キョウ、（ケイ）、さかい kyō, (kei), sakai
414	橋		木	16	3		bridge	キョウ、はし kyō, hashi
415	矯		矢	17	S	1981	rectify	キョウ、た-める kyō, ta-meru
416	鏡		金	19	4		mirror	キョウ、かがみ kyō, kagami
417	競		立	20	4		compete	キョウ、ケイ、きそ-う、せ-る kyō, kei, kiso-u, se-ru
418	響	響	音	20	S		echo	キョウ、ひび-く kyō, hibi-ku
419	驚		馬	22	S		wonder	キョウ、おどろ-く、おどろ-かす kyō, odoro-ku, odoro-kasu
420	仰		人	6	S		face-up	ギョウ、（コウ）、あお-ぐ、おお-せ gyō, (kō), ao-gu, oo-se
421	暁	曉	日	12	S		daybreak	ギョウ、あかつき gyō, akatsuki
422	業		木	13	3		business	ギョウ、ゴウ、わざ gyō, gō, waza
423	凝		冫	16	S		congeal	ギョウ、こ-る、こ-らす gyō, ko-ru, ko-rasu
424	曲		曰	6	3		musical composition	キョク、ま-がる、ま-げる kyoku, ma-garu, ma-geru
425	局		尸	7	3		office	キョク kyoku
426	極		木	12	4		poles	キョク、ゴク、きわ-める、きわ-まる、きわ-み kyoku, goku, kiwa-meru, kiwa-maru, kiwa-mi
427	玉		玉	5	1		ball	ギョク、たま gyoku, tama
428	巾		巾	3	S	2010	towel	キン kin
429	斤		斤	4	S		axe	キン kin
430	均		土	7	5		level	キン kin
431	近		辵	7	2		near	キン、ちか-い kin, chika-i
432	金		金	8	1		gold	キン、コン、かね、（かな） kin, kon, kane, (kana)
433	菌		艸	11	S		germ	キン kin
434	勤	勤	力	12	6		diligence	キン、（ゴン）、つと-める、つと-まる kin, (gon), tsuto-meru, tsuto-maru
435	琴		玉	12	S		harp	キン、こと kin, koto
436	筋		竹	12	6		muscle	キン、すじ kin, suji
437	僅		人	13	S	2010	a wee bit	キン、わず-か kin, wazu-ka
438	禁		示	13	5		prohibition	キン kin
439	緊		糸	15	S		tense	キン kin
440	錦		金	16	S	2010	brocade	キン、にしき kin, nishiki
441	謹	謹	言	17	S		discreet	キン、つつし-む kin, tsutsushi-mu
442	襟		衣	18	S	1981	collar	キン、えり kin, eri
443	吟		口	7	S		versify	ギン gin
444	銀		金	14	3		silver	ギン gin
445	区	區	匸	4	3		ward	ク ku
446	句		口	5	5		phrase	ク ku
447	苦		艸	8	3		suffer	ク、くる-しい、くる-しむ、くる-しめる、にが-い、にが-る ku, kuru-shii, kuru-shimu, kuru-shimeru, niga-i, niga-ru
448	駆	驅	馬	14	S		drive	ク、か-ける、か-る ku, ka-keru, ka-ru
449	具		八	8	3		tool	グ gu
450	惧		心	11	S	2010	dread	グ gu
451	愚		心	13	S		foolish	グ、おろ-か gu, oro-ka
452	空		穴	8	1		sky	クウ、そら、あ-く、あ-ける、から kū, sora, a-ku, a-keru, kara
453	偶		人	11	S		accidentally	グウ gū
454	遇		辵	12	S		interview	グウ gū
455	隅		阜	12	S	1981	corner	グウ、すみ gū, sumi
456	串		丨	7	S	2010	skewer	くし kushi
457	屈		尸	8	S		yield	クツ kutsu
458	掘		手	11	S		dig	クツ、ほ-る kutsu, ho-ru
459	窟		穴	13	S	2010	cavern	クツ kutsu
460	熊		火	14	4	2010	bear	くま kuma
461	繰		糸	19	S		winding	く-る ku-ru
462	君		口	7	3		you	クン、きみ kun, kimi
463	訓		言	10	4		instruction	クン kun
464	勲	勳	力	15	S		meritorious deed	クン kun
465	薫	薰	艸	16	S		fragrant	クン、かお-る kun, kao-ru
466	軍		車	9	4		army	グン gun
467	郡		邑	10	4		county	グン gun
468	群		羊	13	4		flock	グン、む-れる、む-れ、（むら） gun, mu-reru, mu-re, (mura)
469	兄		儿	5	2		older brother	ケイ、（キョウ）、あに kei, (kyō), ani
470	刑		刀	6	S		punish	ケイ kei
471	形		彡	7	2		shape	ケイ、ギョウ、かた、かたち kei, gyō, kata, katachi
472	系		糸	7	6		lineage	ケイ kei
473	径	徑	彳	8	4		diameter	ケイ kei
474	茎	莖	艸	8	S		stalk	ケイ、くき kei, kuki
475	係		人	9	3		person in charge	ケイ、かか-る、かかり kei, kaka-ru, kakari
476	型		土	9	5		model	ケイ、かた kei, kata
477	契		大	9	S		pledge	ケイ、ちぎ-る kei, chigi-ru
478	計		言	9	2		measure	ケイ、はか-る、はか-らう kei, haka-ru, haka-rau
479	恵	惠	心	10	S		favor	ケイ、エ、めぐ-む kei, e, megu-mu
480	啓		口	11	S		disclose	ケイ kei
481	掲	揭	手	11	S		put up (a notice)	ケイ、かか-げる kei, kaka-geru
482	渓	溪	水	11	S	1981	mountain stream	ケイ kei
483	経	經	糸	11	5		manage	ケイ、キョウ、へ-る kei, kyō, he-ru
484	蛍	螢	虫	11	S	1981	lightning-bug	ケイ、ほたる kei, hotaru
485	敬		攴	12	6		respect	ケイ、うやま-う kei, uyama-u
486	景		日	12	4		scenery	ケイ kei
487	軽	輕	車	12	3		lightweight	ケイ、かる-い、かろ-やか kei, karu-i, karo-yaka
488	傾		人	13	S		lean	ケイ、かたむ-く、かたむ-ける kei, katamu-ku, katamu-keru
489	携		手	13	S		portable	ケイ、たずさ-える、たずさ-わる kei, tazusa-eru, tazusa-waru
490	継	繼	糸	13	S		inherit	ケイ、つ-ぐ kei, tsu-gu
491	詣		言	13	S	2010	visit a temple	ケイ、もう-でる kei, mō-deru
492	慶		心	15	S		jubilation	ケイ kei
493	憬		心	15	S	2010	long for	ケイ kei
494	稽		禾	15	S	2010	consider	ケイ kei
495	憩		心	16	S		recess	ケイ、いこ-い、いこ-う kei, iko-i, iko-u
496	警		言	19	6		guard against	ケイ kei
497	鶏	鷄	鳥	19	S		chicken	ケイ、にわとり kei, niwatori
498	芸	藝	艸	7	4		art	ゲイ gei
499	迎		辵	7	S		welcome	ゲイ、むか-える gei, muka-eru
500	鯨		魚	19	S		whale	ゲイ、くじら gei, kujira
501	隙		阜	13	S	2010	fissure	ゲキ、すき geki, suki
502	劇		刀	15	6		drama	ゲキ geki
503	撃	擊	手	15	S		beat	ゲキ、う-つ geki, u-tsu
504	激		水	16	6		violent	ゲキ、はげ-しい geki, hage-shii
505	桁		木	10	S	2010	beam	けた keta
506	欠	缺	缶	4	4		lack	ケツ、か-ける、か-く ketsu, ka-keru, ka-ku
507	穴		穴	5	6		hole	ケツ、あな ketsu, ana
508	血		血	6	3		blood	ケツ、ち ketsu, chi
509	決		水	7	3		decide	ケツ、き-める、き-まる ketsu, ki-meru, ki-maru
510	結		糸	12	4		tie	ケツ、むす-ぶ、ゆ-う、ゆ-わえる ketsu, musu-bu, yu-u, yu-waeru
511	傑		人	13	S		greatness	ケツ ketsu
512	潔		水	15	5		undefiled	ケツ、いさぎよ-い ketsu, isagiyo-i
513	月		月	4	1		month, moon	ゲツ、ガツ、つき getsu, gatsu, tsuki
514	犬		犬	4	1		dog	ケン、いぬ ken, inu
515	件		人	6	5		affair	ケン ken
516	見		見	7	1		see	ケン、み-る、み-える、み-せる ken, mi-ru, mi-eru, mi-seru
517	券		刀	8	6		ticket	ケン ken
518	肩		肉	8	S		shoulder	ケン、かた ken, kata
519	建		廴	9	4		build	ケン、（コン）、た-てる、た-つ ken, (kon), ta-teru, ta-tsu
520	研	硏	石	9	3		sharpen	ケン、と-ぐ ken, to-gu
521	県	縣	糸	9	3		prefecture	ケン ken
522	倹	儉	人	10	S		frugal	ケン ken
523	兼		八	10	S		concurrently	ケン、か-ねる ken, ka-neru
524	剣	劍	刀	10	S		sabre	ケン、つるぎ ken, tsurugi
525	拳		手	10	S	2010	fist	ケン、こぶし ken, kobushi
526	軒		車	10	S		flats	ケン、のき ken, noki
527	健		人	11	4		healthy	ケン、すこ-やか ken, suko-yaka
528	険	險	阜	11	5		precipitous	ケン、けわ-しい ken, kewa-shii
529	圏	圈	囗	12	S		sphere	ケン ken
530	堅		土	12	S		strict	ケン、かた-い ken, kata-i
531	検	檢	木	12	5		examine	ケン ken
532	嫌		女	13	S	1981	dislike	ケン、（ゲン）、きら-う、いや ken, (gen), kira-u, iya
533	献	獻	犬	13	S		offering	ケン、（コン） ken, (kon)
534	絹		糸	13	6		silk	ケン、きぬ ken, kinu
535	遣		辵	13	S		dispatch	ケン、つか-う、つか-わす ken, tsuka-u, tsuka-wasu
536	権	權	木	15	6		rights	ケン、（ゴン） ken, (gon)
537	憲		心	16	6		constitution	ケン ken
538	賢		貝	16	S		intelligent	ケン、かしこ-い ken, kashiko-i
539	謙		言	17	S		self-effacing	ケン ken
540	鍵		金	17	S	2010	key	ケン、かぎ ken, kagi
541	繭		糸	18	S		cocoon	ケン、まゆ ken, mayu
542	顕	顯	頁	18	S		appear	ケン ken
543	験	驗	馬	18	4		test	ケン、（ゲン） ken, (gen)
544	懸		心	20	S		suspend	ケン、（ケ）、か-ける、か-かる ken, (ke), ka-keru, ka-karu
545	元		儿	4	2		origin	ゲン、ガン、もと gen, gan, moto
546	幻		幺	4	S		phantasm	ゲン、まぼろし gen, maboroshi
547	玄		玄	5	S		mysterious	ゲン gen
548	言		言	7	2		say	ゲン、ゴン、い-う、こと gen, gon, i-u, koto
549	弦		弓	8	S		bowstring	ゲン、つる gen, tsuru
550	限		阜	9	5		limit	ゲン、かぎ-る gen, kagi-ru
551	原		厂	10	2		field	ゲン、はら gen, hara
552	現		玉	11	5		appear	ゲン、あらわ-れる、あらわ-す gen, arawa-reru, arawa-su
553	舷		舟	11	S	2010	gunwale	ゲン gen
554	減		水	12	5		decrease	ゲン、へ-る、へ-らす gen, he-ru, he-rasu
555	源		水	13	6		origin	ゲン、みなもと gen, minamoto
556	厳	嚴	口	17	6		strict	ゲン、（ゴン）、おごそ-か、きび-しい gen, (gon), ogoso-ka, kibi-shii
557	己		己	3	6		self	コ、キ、おのれ ko, ki, onore
558	戸		戶	4	2		door	コ、と ko, to
559	古		口	5	2		old	コ、ふる-い、ふる-す ko, furu-i, furu-su
560	呼		口	8	6		call	コ、よ-ぶ ko, yo-bu
561	固		囗	8	4		hard	コ、かた-める、かた-まる、かた-い ko, kata-meru, kata-maru, kata-i
562	股		肉	8	S	2010	crotch	コ、また ko, mata
563	虎		虍	8	S	2010	tiger	コ、とら ko, tora
564	孤		子	9	S		orphan	コ ko
565	弧		弓	9	S		arc	コ ko
566	故		攴	9	5		circumstances	コ、ゆえ ko, yue
567	枯		木	9	S		wither	コ、か-れる、か-らす ko, ka-reru, ka-rasu
568	個		人	10	5		individual	コ ko
569	庫		广	10	3		warehouse	コ、（ク） ko, (ku)
570	湖		水	12	3		lake	コ、みずうみ ko, mizuumi
571	雇		隹	12	S		employ	コ、やと-う ko, yato-u
572	誇		言	13	S		boast	コ、ほこ-る ko, hoko-ru
573	鼓		鼓	13	S		drum	コ、つづみ ko, tsuzumi
574	錮		金	16	S	2010	tie up	コ ko
575	顧		頁	21	S		look back	コ、かえり-みる ko, kaeri-miru
576	五		二	4	1		five	ゴ、いつ、いつ-つ go, itsu, itsu-tsu
577	互		二	4	S		mutually	ゴ、たが-い go, taga-i
578	午		十	4	2		noon	ゴ go
579	呉		口	7	S		give	ゴ go
580	後		彳	9	2		behind	ゴ、コウ、のち、うし-ろ、あと、おく-れる go, kō, nochi, ushi-ro, ato, oku-reru
581	娯		女	10	S		recreation	ゴ go
582	悟		心	10	S		enlightenment	ゴ、さと-る go, sato-ru
583	碁		石	13	S		Go	ゴ go
584	語		言	14	2		language	ゴ、かた-る、かた-らう go, kata-ru, kata-rau
585	誤		言	14	6		mistake	ゴ、あやま-る go, ayama-ru
586	護		言	20	5		safeguard	ゴ go
587	口		口	3	1		mouth	コウ、ク、くち kō, ku, kuchi
588	工		工	3	2		craft	コウ、ク kō, ku
589	公		八	4	2		public	コウ、おおやけ kō, ooyake
590	勾		勹	4	S	2010	capture	コウ kō
591	孔		子	4	S		cavity	コウ kō
592	功		力	5	4		achievement	コウ、（ク） kō, (ku)
593	巧		工	5	S		adroit	コウ、たく-み kō, taku-mi
594	広	廣	广	5	2		wide	コウ、ひろ-い、ひろ-まる、ひろ-める、ひろ-がる、ひろ-げる kō, hiro-i, hiro-maru, hiro-meru, hiro-garu, hiro-geru
595	甲		田	5	S		armor	コウ、カン kō, kan
596	交		亠	6	2		mix	コウ、まじ-わる、まじ-える、ま-じる、ま-ざる、ま-ぜる、か-う、か-わす kō, maji-waru, maji-eru, ma-jiru, ma-zaru, ma-zeru, ka-u, ka-wasu
597	光		儿	6	2		ray	コウ、ひか-る、ひかり kō, hika-ru, hikari
598	向		口	6	3		over there	コウ、む-く、む-ける、む-かう、む-こう kō, mu-ku, mu-keru, mu-kau, mu-kō
599	后		口	6	6		empress	コウ kō
600	好		女	6	4		like	コウ、この-む、す-く kō, kono-mu, su-ku
601	江		水	6	S		inlet	コウ、え kō, e
602	考		老	6	2		think	コウ、かんが-える kō, kanga-eru
603	行		行	6	2		go	コウ、ギョウ、（アン）、い-く、ゆ-く、おこな-う kō, gyō, (an), i-ku, yu-ku, okona-u
604	坑		土	7	S		pit	コウ kō
605	孝		子	7	6		filial piety	コウ kō
606	抗		手	7	S		confront	コウ kō
607	攻		攴	7	S		aggression	コウ、せ-める kō, se-meru
608	更		曰	7	S		grow late	コウ、さら、ふ-ける、ふ-かす kō, sara, fu-keru, fu-kasu
609	効	效	力	8	5		effect	コウ、き-く kō, ki-ku
610	幸		干	8	3		happiness	コウ、さいわ-い、さち、しあわ-せ kō, saiwa-i, sachi, shiawa-se
611	拘		手	8	S		arrest	コウ kō
612	肯		肉	8	S		agreement	コウ kō
613	侯		人	9	S		marquis	コウ kō
614	厚		厂	9	5		thick	コウ、あつ-い kō, atsu-i
615	恒	恆	心	9	S		constancy	コウ kō
616	洪		水	9	S	1981	deluge	コウ kō
617	皇		白	9	6		emperor	コウ、オウ kō, ō
618	紅		糸	9	6		deep red	コウ、（ク）、べに、くれない kō, (ku), beni, kurenai
619	荒		艸	9	S		laid waste	コウ、あら-い、あ-れる、あ-らす kō, ara-i, a-reru, a-rasu
620	郊		邑	9	S		outskirts	コウ kō
621	香		香	9	4		incense	コウ、（キョウ）、か、かお-り、かお-る kō, (kyō), ka, kao-ri, kao-ru
622	候		人	10	4		climate	コウ、そうろう kō, sōrō
623	校		木	10	1		school	コウ kō
624	耕		耒	10	5		till	コウ、たがや-す kō, tagaya-su
625	航		舟	10	5		cruise	コウ kō
626	貢		貝	10	S		tribute	コウ、（ク）、みつ-ぐ kō, (ku), mitsu-gu
627	降		阜	10	6		descend	コウ、お-りる、お-ろす、ふ-る kō, o-riru, o-rosu, fu-ru
628	高		高	10	2		tall, expensive	コウ、たか-い、たか、たか-まる、たか-める kō, taka-i, taka, taka-maru, taka-meru
629	康		广	11	4		health	コウ kō
630	控		手	11	S		withdraw	コウ、ひか-える kō, hika-eru
631	梗		木	11	S	2010	close up	コウ kō
632	黄	黃	黃	11	2		yellow	コウ、オウ、き、（こ） kō, ō, ki, (ko)
633	喉		口	12	S	2010	throat	コウ、のど kō, nodo
634	慌		心	12	S		disconcerted	コウ、あわ-てる、あわ-ただしい kō, awa-teru, awa-tadashii
635	港		水	12	3		harbor	コウ、みなと kō, minato
636	硬		石	12	S		stiff	コウ、かた-い kō, kata-i
637	絞		糸	12	S		strangle	コウ、しぼ-る、し-める、し-まる kō, shibo-ru, shi-meru, shi-maru
638	項		頁	12	S		paragraph	コウ kō
639	溝		水	13	S	1981	gutter	コウ、みぞ kō, mizo
640	鉱	鑛	金	13	5		mineral	コウ kō
641	構		木	14	5		construct	コウ、かま-える、かま-う kō, kama-eru, kama-u
642	綱		糸	14	S		hawser	コウ、つな kō, tsuna
643	酵		酉	14	S		fermentation	コウ kō
644	稿		禾	15	S		draft	コウ kō
645	興		臼	16	5		entertain	コウ、キョウ、おこ-る、おこ-す kō, kyō, oko-ru, oko-su
646	衡		行	16	S		equilibrium	コウ kō
647	鋼		金	16	6		steel	コウ、はがね kō, hagane
648	講		言	17	5		lecture	コウ kō
649	購		貝	17	S		subscription	コウ kō
650	乞		乙	3	S	2010	beg	こ-う ko-u
651	号	號	虍	5	3		number	ゴウ gō
652	合		口	6	2		fit	ゴウ、ガッ、（カッ）、あ-う、あ-わす、あ-わせる gō, ga', (ka'), a-u, a-wasu, a-waseru
653	拷		手	9	S		torture	ゴウ gō
654	剛		刀	10	S		sturdy	ゴウ gō
655	傲		人	13	S	2010	be proud	ゴウ gō
656	豪		豕	14	S		overpowering	ゴウ gō
657	克		儿	7	S		overcome	コク koku
658	告		口	7	5		tell	コク、つ-げる koku, tsu-geru
659	谷		谷	7	2		valley	コク、たに koku, tani
660	刻		刀	8	6		engrave	コク、きざ-む koku, kiza-mu
661	国	國	囗	8	2		country	コク、くに koku, kuni
662	黒	黑	黑	11	2		black	コク、くろ、くろ-い koku, kuro, kuro-i
663	穀	穀	禾	14	6		cereals	コク koku
664	酷		酉	14	S		cruel	コク koku
665	獄		犬	14	S		prison	ゴク goku
666	骨		骨	10	6		bone	コツ、ほね kotsu, hone
667	駒		馬	15	S	2010	horse	こま koma
668	込		辵	5	S		crowded	こ-む、こ-める ko-mu, ko-meru
669	頃		頁	11	S	2010	times	ころ koro
670	今		人	4	2		now	コン、キン、いま kon, kin, ima
671	困		囗	7	6		become distressed	コン、こま-る kon, koma-ru
672	昆		日	8	S	1981	descendants	コン kon
673	恨		心	9	S		rancor	コン、うら-む、うら-めしい kon, ura-mu, ura-meshii
674	根		木	10	3		root	コン、ね kon, ne
675	婚		女	11	S		marriage	コン kon
676	混		水	11	5		mix	コン、ま-じる、ま-ざる、ま-ぜる、こ-む kon, ma-jiru, ma-zaru, ma-zeru, ko-mu
677	痕		疒	11	S	2010	mark	コン、あと kon, ato
678	紺		糸	11	S		dark blue	コン kon
679	魂		鬼	14	S		soul	コン、たましい kon, tamashii
680	墾		土	16	S		ground-breaking	コン kon
681	懇		心	17	S		sociable	コン、ねんご-ろ kon, nengo-ro
682	左		工	5	1		left (direction)	サ、ひだり sa, hidari
683	佐		人	7	4		help	サ sa
684	沙		水	7	S	2010	sand	サ sa
685	査		木	9	5		investigate	サ sa
686	砂		石	9	6		sand	サ、シャ、すな sa, sha, suna
687	唆		口	10	S		tempt	サ、そそのか-す sa, sosonoka-su
688	差		工	10	4		distinction	サ、さ-す sa, sa-su
689	詐		言	12	S		lie	サ sa
690	鎖		金	18	S		chain	サ、くさり sa, kusari
691	座		广	10	6		sit	ザ、すわ-る za, suwa-ru
692	挫		手	10	S	2010	sprain	ザ za
693	才		手	3	2		genius	サイ sai
694	再		冂	6	5		again	サイ、（サ）、ふたた-び sai, (sa), futata-bi
695	災		火	7	5		disaster	サイ、わざわ-い sai, wazawa-i
696	妻		女	8	5		wife	サイ、つま sai, tsuma
697	采		釆	8	S	2010	form	サイ sai
698	砕	碎	石	9	S		smash	サイ、くだ-く、くだ-ける sai, kuda-ku, kuda-keru
699	宰		宀	10	S		superintend	サイ sai
700	栽		木	10	S		plantation	サイ sai
701	彩		彡	11	S		coloring	サイ、いろど-る sai, irodo-ru
702	採		手	11	5		pick	サイ、と-る sai, to-ru
703	済	濟	水	11	6		settle	サイ、す-む、す-ます sai, su-mu, su-masu
704	祭		示	11	3		festival	サイ、まつ-る、まつ-り sai, matsu-ru, matsu-ri
705	斎	齋	齊	11	S		purification	サイ sai
706	細		糸	11	2		thin	サイ、ほそ-い、ほそ-る、こま-か、こま-かい sai, hoso-i, hoso-ru, koma-ka, koma-kai
707	菜		艸	11	4		vegetable	サイ、な sai, na
708	最		曰	12	4		most	サイ、もっと-も sai, motto-mo
709	裁		衣	12	6		judge	サイ、た-つ、さば-く sai, ta-tsu, saba-ku
710	債		人	13	S		bond	サイ sai
711	催		人	13	S		sponsor	サイ、もよお-す sai, moyoo-su
712	塞		土	13	S	2010	obstruct	サイ、ソク、ふさ-ぐ、ふさ-がる sai, soku, fusa-gu, fusa-garu
713	歳		止	13	S		year-end	サイ、（セイ） sai, (sei)
714	載		車	13	S		ride	サイ、の-せる、の-る sai, no-seru, no-ru
715	際		阜	14	5		occasion	サイ、きわ sai, kiwa
716	埼		土	11	4	2010	cape (geography)	（さい） (sai)
717	在		土	6	5		exist	ザイ、あ-る zai, a-ru
718	材		木	7	4		lumber	ザイ zai
719	剤	劑	刀	10	S		dose	ザイ zai
720	財		貝	10	5		wealth	ザイ、（サイ） zai, (sai)
721	罪		网	13	5		guilt	ザイ、つみ zai, tsumi
722	崎		山	11	4	1981	promontory	さき saki
723	作		人	7	2		make	サク、サ、つく-る saku, sa, tsuku-ru
724	削		刀	9	S		plane	サク、けず-る saku, kezu-ru
725	昨		日	9	4		previous	サク saku
726	柵		木	9	S	2010	fence	サク saku
727	索		糸	10	S		cord	サク saku
728	策		竹	12	6		scheme	サク saku
729	酢		酉	12	S		vinegar	サク、す saku, su
730	搾		手	13	S		squeeze	サク、しぼ-る saku, shibo-ru
731	錯		金	16	S		confused	サク saku
732	咲		口	9	S		blossom	さ-く sa-ku
733	冊		冂	5	6		counter for books	サツ、サク satsu, saku
734	札		木	5	4		tag	サツ、ふだ satsu, fuda
735	刷		刀	8	4		printing	サツ、す-る satsu, su-ru
736	刹		刀	8	S	2010	temple	サツ、セツ satsu, setsu
737	拶		手	9	S	2010	be imminent	サツ satsu
738	殺	殺	殳	10	5		kill	サツ、（サイ）、（セツ）、ころ-す satsu, (sai), (setsu), koro-su
739	察		宀	14	4		guess	サツ satsu
740	撮		手	15	S		snapshot	サツ、と-る satsu, to-ru
741	擦		手	17	S		grate	サツ、す-る、す-れる satsu, su-ru, su-reru
742	雑	雜	隹	14	5		miscellaneous	ザツ、ゾウ zatsu, zō
743	皿		皿	5	3	1981	dish	さら sara
744	三		一	3	1		three	サン、み、み-つ、みっ-つ san, mi, mi-tsu, mi'-tsu
745	山		山	3	1		mountain	サン、やま san, yama
746	参	參	厶	8	4		participate	サン、まい-る san, mai-ru
747	桟	棧	木	10	S	1981	scaffold	サン san
748	蚕	蠶	虫	10	6		silkworm	サン、かいこ san, kaiko
749	惨	慘	心	11	S		wretched	サン、ザン、みじ-め san, zan, miji-me
750	産		生	11	4		give birth	サン、う-む、う-まれる、うぶ san, u-mu, u-mareru, ubu
751	傘		人	12	S	1981	umbrella	サン、かさ san, kasa
752	散		攴	12	4		scatter	サン、ち-る、ち-らす、ち-らかす、ち-らかる san, chi-ru, chi-rasu, chi-rakasu, chi-rakaru
753	算		竹	14	2		calculate	サン san
754	酸		酉	14	5		acid	サン、す-い san, su-i
755	賛	贊	貝	15	5		approve	サン san
756	残	殘	歹	10	4		remainder	ザン、のこ-る、のこ-す zan, noko-ru, noko-su
757	斬		斤	11	S	2010	kill by slicing	ザン、き-る zan, ki-ru
758	暫		日	15	S		temporarily	ザン zan
759	士		士	3	5		gentleman	シ shi
760	子		子	3	1		child	シ、ス、こ shi, su, ko
761	支		支	4	5		branch	シ、ささ-える shi, sasa-eru
762	止		止	4	2		stop	シ、と-まる、と-める shi, to-maru, to-meru
763	氏		氏	4	4		family name	シ、うじ shi, uji
764	仕		人	5	3		do	シ、（ジ）、つか-える shi, (ji), tsuka-eru
765	史		口	5	5		history	シ shi
766	司		口	5	4		director	シ shi
767	四		囗	5	1		four	シ、よ、よ-つ、よっ-つ、よん shi, yo, yo-tsu, yo'-tsu, yon
768	市		巾	5	2		market	シ、いち shi, ichi
769	矢		矢	5	2		arrow	シ、や shi, ya
770	旨		日	6	S		delicious	シ、むね shi, mune
771	死		歹	6	3		death	シ、し-ぬ shi, shi-nu
772	糸	絲	糸	6	1		thread	シ、いと shi, ito
773	至		至	6	6		climax	シ、いた-る shi, ita-ru
774	伺		人	7	S		pay respects	シ、うかが-う shi, ukaga-u
775	志		心	7	5		intention	シ、こころざ-す、こころざし shi, kokoroza-su, kokorozashi
776	私		禾	7	6		me	シ、わたくし、わたし shi, watakushi, watashi
777	使		人	8	3		use	シ、つか-う shi, tsuka-u
778	刺		刀	8	S		thorn	シ、さ-す、さ-さる shi, sa-su, sa-saru
779	始		女	8	3		begin	シ、はじ-める、はじ-まる shi, haji-meru, haji-maru
780	姉		女	8	2		older sister	シ、あね shi, ane
781	枝		木	8	5		branch	シ、えだ shi, eda
782	祉	祉	示	8	S		welfare	シ shi
783	肢		肉	8	S	1981	limb	シ shi
784	姿		女	9	6		figure	シ、すがた shi, sugata
785	思		心	9	2		think	シ、おも-う shi, omo-u
786	指		手	9	3		finger	シ、ゆび、さ-す shi, yubi, sa-su
787	施		方	9	S		carry out	シ、セ、ほどこ-す shi, se, hodoko-su
788	師		巾	10	5		expert	シ shi
789	恣		心	10	S	2010	selfish	シ shi
790	紙		糸	10	2		paper	シ、かみ shi, kami
791	脂		肉	10	S		fat	シ、あぶら shi, abura
792	視	視	見	11	6		look at	シ shi
793	紫		糸	12	S		purple	シ、むらさき shi, murasaki
794	詞		言	12	6		poetry	シ shi
795	歯	齒	齒	12	3		tooth	シ、は shi, ha
796	嗣		口	13	S		heir	シ shi
797	試		言	13	4		test	シ、こころ-みる、ため-す shi, kokoro-miru, tame-su
798	詩		言	13	3		poem	シ shi
799	資		貝	13	5		resources	シ shi
800	飼		食	13	5		domesticate	シ、か-う shi, ka-u
801	誌		言	14	6		document	シ shi
802	雌		隹	14	S		feminine	シ、め、めす shi, me, mesu
803	摯		手	15	S	2010	seriousness	シ shi
804	賜		貝	15	S		grant	シ、たまわ-る shi, tamawa-ru
805	諮		言	16	S		consult with	シ、はか-る shi, haka-ru
806	示		示	5	5		indicate	ジ、シ、しめ-す ji, shi, shime-su
807	字		子	6	1		letter	ジ、あざ ji, aza
808	寺		寸	6	2		Buddhist temple	ジ、てら ji, tera
809	次		欠	6	3		next	ジ、シ、つ-ぐ、つぎ ji, shi, tsu-gu, tsugi
810	耳		耳	6	1		ear	ジ、みみ ji, mimi
811	自		自	6	2		oneself	ジ、シ、みずか-ら ji, shi, mizuka-ra
812	似		人	7	5		becoming	ジ、に-る ji, ni-ru
813	児	兒	儿	7	4		child	ジ、（ニ） ji, (ni)
814	事		亅	8	3		abstract thing	ジ、（ズ）、こと ji, (zu), koto
815	侍		人	8	S		waiter	ジ、さむらい ji, samurai
816	治		水	8	4		govern	ジ、チ、おさ-める、おさ-まる、なお-る、なお-す ji, chi, osa-meru, osa-maru, nao-ru, nao-su
817	持		手	9	3		hold	ジ、も-つ ji, mo-tsu
818	時		日	10	2		time	ジ、とき ji, toki
819	滋		水	12	4		nourishing	ジ ji
820	慈		心	13	S		mercy	ジ、いつく-しむ ji, itsuku-shimu
821	辞	辭	辛	13	4		resign	ジ、や-める ji, ya-meru
822	磁		石	14	6		magnet	ジ ji
823	餌		食	15	S	2010	bait	ジ、えさ、え ji, esa, e
824	璽		玉	19	S		emperor's seal	ジ ji
825	鹿		鹿	11	4	2010	deer	しか、（か） shika, (ka)
826	式		弋	6	3		style	シキ shiki
827	識		言	19	5		discriminating	シキ shiki
828	軸		車	12	S		axis	ジク jiku
829	七		一	2	1		seven	シチ、なな、なな-つ、（なの） shichi, nana, nana-tsu, (nano)
830	𠮟		口	5	S	2010	scold	シツ、しか-る shitsu, shika-ru
831	失		大	5	4		lose	シツ、うしな-う shitsu, ushina-u
832	室		宀	9	2		room	シツ、むろ shitsu, muro
833	疾		疒	10	S		rapidly	シツ shitsu
834	執		土	11	S		tenacious	シツ、シュウ、と-る shitsu, shū, to-ru
835	湿	濕	水	12	S		damp	シツ、しめ-る、しめ-す shitsu, shime-ru, shime-su
836	嫉		女	13	S	2010	envy	シツ shitsu
837	漆		水	14	S		lacquer	シツ、うるし shitsu, urushi
838	質		貝	15	5		quality	シツ、シチ、（チ） shitsu, shichi, (chi)
839	実	實	宀	8	3		truth	ジツ、み、みの-る jitsu, mi, mino-ru
840	芝		艸	6	S		turf	しば shiba
841	写	寫	宀	5	3		copy	シャ、うつ-す、うつ-る sha, utsu-su, utsu-ru
842	社	社	示	7	2		company	シャ、やしろ sha, yashiro
843	車		車	7	1		car	シャ、くるま sha, kuruma
844	舎	舍	舌	8	5		cottage	シャ sha
845	者	者	老	8	3		someone	シャ、もの sha, mono
846	射		寸	10	6		shoot	シャ、い-る sha, i-ru
847	捨		手	11	6		throw away	シャ、す-てる sha, su-teru
848	赦		赤	11	S		pardon	シャ sha
849	斜		斗	11	S		diagonal	シャ、なな-め sha, nana-me
850	煮	煮	火	12	S		boil	シャ、に-る、に-える、に-やす sha, ni-ru, ni-eru, ni-yasu
851	遮		辵	14	S	1981	intercept	シャ、さえぎ-る sha, saegi-ru
852	謝		言	17	5		apologize	シャ、あやま-る sha, ayama-ru
853	邪		邑	8	S		wicked	ジャ ja
854	蛇		虫	11	S	1981	snake	ジャ、ダ、へび ja, da, hebi
855	尺		尸	4	6		shaku	シャク shaku
856	借		人	10	4		borrow	シャク、か-りる shaku, ka-riru
857	酌		酉	10	S	1981	bartending	シャク、く-む shaku, ku-mu
858	釈	釋	釆	11	S		explanation	シャク shaku
859	爵		爪	17	S		baron	シャク shaku
860	若		艸	8	6		young	ジャク、（ニャク）、わか-い、も-しくは jaku, (nyaku), waka-i, mo-shikuha
861	弱		弓	10	2		weak	ジャク、よわ-い、よわ-る、よわ-まる、よわ-める jaku, yowa-i, yowa-ru, yowa-maru, yowa-meru
862	寂		宀	11	S		loneliness	ジャク、（セキ）、さび、さび-しい、さび-れる jaku, (seki), sabi, sabi-shii, sabi-reru
863	手		手	4	1		hand	シュ、て、（た） shu, te, (ta)
864	主		丶	5	3		master	シュ、（ス）、ぬし、おも shu, (su), nushi, omo
865	守		宀	6	3		protect	シュ、（ス）、まも-る、も-り shu, (su), mamo-ru, mo-ri
866	朱		木	6	S		vermilion	シュ shu
867	取		又	8	3		take	シュ、と-る shu, to-ru
868	狩		犬	9	S		hunt	シュ、か-る、か-り shu, ka-ru, ka-ri
869	首		首	9	2		neck	シュ、くび shu, kubi
870	殊		歹	10	S		particularly	シュ、こと shu, koto
871	珠		玉	10	S		pearl	シュ shu
872	酒		酉	10	3		alcoholic drink	シュ、さけ、（さか） shu, sake, (saka)
873	腫		肉	13	S	2010	tumor	シュ、は-れる、は-らす shu, ha-reru, ha-rasu
874	種		禾	14	4		kind	シュ、たね shu, tane
875	趣		走	15	S		gist	シュ、おもむき shu, omomuki
876	寿	壽	士	7	S		longevity	ジュ、ことぶき ju, kotobuki
877	受		又	8	3		accept	ジュ、う-ける、う-かる ju, u-keru, u-karu
878	呪		口	8	S	2010	curse	ジュ、のろ-う ju, noro-u
879	授		手	11	5		instruct	ジュ、さず-ける、さず-かる ju, sazu-keru, sazu-karu
880	需		雨	14	S		demand	ジュ ju
881	儒		人	16	S		Confucian	ジュ ju
882	樹		木	16	6		trees	ジュ ju
883	収	收	攴	4	6		take in	シュウ、おさ-める、おさ-まる shū, osa-meru, osa-maru
884	囚		囗	5	S		captured	シュウ shū
885	州		巛	6	3		state	シュウ、す shū, su
886	舟		舟	6	S		boat	シュウ、ふね、（ふな） shū, fune, (funa)
887	秀		禾	7	S		excel	シュウ、ひい-でる shū, hii-deru
888	周		口	8	4		circumference	シュウ、まわ-り shū, mawa-ri
889	宗		宀	8	6		religion	シュウ、ソウ shū, sō
890	拾		手	9	3		pick up	シュウ、ジュウ、ひろ-う shū, jū, hiro-u
891	秋		禾	9	2		autumn	シュウ、あき shū, aki
892	臭	臭	自	9	S		stinking	シュウ、くさ-い、にお-う shū, kusa-i, nio-u
893	修		人	10	5		discipline	シュウ、（シュ）、おさ-める、おさ-まる shū, (shu), osa-meru, osa-maru
894	袖		衣	10	S	2010	sleeve	シュウ、そで shū, sode
895	終		糸	11	3		end	シュウ、お-わる、お-える shū, o-waru, o-eru
896	羞		羊	11	S	2010	feel ashamed	シュウ shū
897	習		羽	11	3		learn	シュウ、なら-う shū, nara-u
898	週		辵	11	2		week	シュウ shū
899	就		尢	12	6		concerning	シュウ、（ジュ）、つ-く、つ-ける shū, (ju), tsu-ku, tsu-keru
900	衆		血	12	6		masses	シュウ、（シュ） shū, (shu)
901	集		隹	12	3		collect	シュウ、あつ-まる、あつ-める、つど-う shū, atsu-maru, atsu-meru, tsudo-u
902	愁		心	13	S		distress	シュウ、うれ-える、うれ-い shū, ure-eru, ure-i
903	酬		酉	13	S		repay	シュウ shū
904	醜		酉	17	S		ugly	シュウ、みにく-い shū, miniku-i
905	蹴		足	19	S	2010	kick	シュウ、け-る shū, ke-ru
906	襲		衣	22	S		attack	シュウ、おそ-う shū, oso-u
907	十		十	2	1		ten	ジュウ、ジッ、とお、と jū, ji', too, to
908	汁		水	5	S	1981	soup	ジュウ、しる jū, shiru
909	充		儿	6	S		allot	ジュウ、あ-てる jū, a-teru
910	住		人	7	3		dwelling	ジュウ、す-む、す-まう jū, su-mu, su-mau
911	柔		木	9	S		tender	ジュウ、ニュウ、やわ-らか、やわ-らかい jū, nyū, yawa-raka, yawa-rakai
912	重		里	9	3		heavy	ジュウ、チョウ、え、おも-い、かさ-ねる、かさ-なる jū, chō, e, omo-i, kasa-neru, kasa-naru
913	従	從	彳	10	6		obey	ジュウ、（ショウ）、（ジュ）、したが-う、したが-える jū, (shō), (ju), shitaga-u, shitaga-eru
914	渋	澁	水	11	S		astringent	ジュウ、しぶ、しぶ-い、しぶ-る jū, shibu, shibu-i, shibu-ru
915	銃		金	14	S		gun	ジュウ jū
916	獣	獸	犬	16	S		animal	ジュウ、けもの jū, kemono
917	縦	縱	糸	16	6		vertical	ジュウ、たて jū, tate
918	叔		又	8	S		uncle	シュク shuku
919	祝	祝	示	9	4		celebrate	シュク、（シュウ）、いわ-う shuku, (shū), iwa-u
920	宿		宀	11	3		inn	シュク、やど、やど-る、やど-す shuku, yado, yado-ru, yado-su
921	淑		水	11	S		graceful	シュク shuku
922	粛	肅	聿	11	S		solemn	シュク shuku
923	縮		糸	17	6		shrink	シュク、ちぢ-む、ちぢ-まる、ちぢ-める、ちぢ-れる、ちぢ-らす shuku, chiji-mu, chiji-maru, chiji-meru, chiji-reru, chiji-rasu
924	塾		土	14	S	1981	cram school	ジュク juku
925	熟		火	15	6		ripen	ジュク、う-れる juku, u-reru
926	出		凵	5	1		exit	シュツ、（スイ）、で-る、だ-す shutsu, (sui), de-ru, da-su
927	述		辵	8	5		mention	ジュツ、の-べる jutsu, no-beru
928	術		行	11	5		art	ジュツ jutsu
929	俊		人	9	S		genius	シュン shun
930	春		日	9	2		springtime	シュン、はる shun, haru
931	瞬		目	18	S		wink	シュン、またた-く shun, matata-ku
932	旬		日	6	S		10-day period (of the month)	ジュン、（シュン） jun, (shun)
933	巡		巛	6	S		patrol	ジュン、めぐ-る jun, megu-ru
934	盾		目	9	S		shield	ジュン、たて jun, tate
935	准		冫	10	S		quasi-	ジュン jun
936	殉		歹	10	S		martyrdom	ジュン jun
937	純		糸	10	6		genuine	ジュン jun
938	循		彳	12	S		sequential	ジュン jun
939	順		頁	12	4		obey	ジュン jun
940	準		水	13	5		standard	ジュン jun
941	潤		水	15	S		wet	ジュン、うるお-う、うるお-す、うる-む jun, uruo-u, uruo-su, uru-mu
942	遵		辵	15	S		abide by	ジュン jun
943	処	處	虍	5	6		dispose	ショ sho
944	初		刀	7	4		first	ショ、はじ-め、はじ-めて、はつ、うい、そ-める sho, haji-me, haji-mete, hatsu, ui, so-meru
945	所		戶	8	3		place	ショ、ところ sho, tokoro
946	書		曰	10	2		write	ショ、か-く sho, ka-ku
947	庶		广	11	S		commoner	ショ sho
948	暑	暑	日	12	3		hot	ショ、あつ-い sho, atsu-i
949	署	署	网	13	6		government office	ショ sho
950	緒	緖	糸	14	S		thong	ショ、（チョ）、お sho, (cho), o
951	諸	諸	言	15	6		various	ショ sho
952	女		女	3	1		woman	ジョ、ニョ、（ニョウ）、おんな、め jo, nyo, (nyō), onna, me
953	如		女	6	S		likeness	ジョ、ニョ jo, nyo
954	助		力	7	3		help	ジョ、たす-ける、たす-かる、すけ jo, tasu-keru, tasu-karu, suke
955	序		广	7	5		preface	ジョ jo
956	叙	敍	攴	9	S		confer	ジョ jo
957	徐		彳	10	S		gradually	ジョ jo
958	除		阜	10	6		exclude	ジョ、（ジ）、のぞ-く jo, (ji), nozo-ku
959	小		小	3	1		small	ショウ、ちい-さい、こ、お shō, chii-sai, ko, o
960	升		十	4	S		measuring box	ショウ、ます shō, masu
961	少		小	4	2		few	ショウ、すく-ない、すこ-し shō, suku-nai, suko-shi
962	召		口	5	S		summon	ショウ、め-す shō, me-su
963	匠		匚	6	S		artisan	ショウ shō
964	床		广	7	S		bed	ショウ、とこ、ゆか shō, toko, yuka
965	抄		手	7	S		extract	ショウ shō
966	肖		肉	7	S		resemblance	ショウ shō
967	尚		小	8	S	1981	esteem	ショウ shō
968	招		手	8	5		beckon	ショウ、まね-く shō, mane-ku
969	承		手	8	6		acquiesce	ショウ、うけたまわ-る shō, uketamawa-ru
970	昇		日	8	S		rise up	ショウ、のぼ-る shō, nobo-ru
971	松		木	8	4		pine	ショウ、まつ shō, matsu
972	沼		水	8	S		marsh	ショウ、ぬま shō, numa
973	昭		日	9	3		shining	ショウ shō
974	宵		宀	10	S	1981	wee hours	ショウ、よい shō, yoi
975	将	將	寸	10	6		leader	ショウ shō
976	消		水	10	3		extinguish	ショウ、き-える、け-す shō, ki-eru, ke-su
977	症		疒	10	S		symptoms	ショウ shō
978	祥	祥	示	10	S		auspicious	ショウ shō
979	称	稱	禾	10	S		appellation	ショウ shō
980	笑		竹	10	4		laugh	ショウ、わら-う、え-む shō, wara-u, e-mu
981	唱		口	11	4		chant	ショウ、とな-える shō, tona-eru
982	商		口	11	3		sell	ショウ、あきな-う shō, akina-u
983	渉	涉	水	11	S		ford	ショウ shō
984	章		立	11	3		chapter	ショウ shō
985	紹		糸	11	S		introduce	ショウ shō
986	訟		言	11	S		sue	ショウ shō
987	勝		力	12	3		win	ショウ、か-つ、まさ-る shō, ka-tsu, masa-ru
988	掌		手	12	S		manipulate	ショウ shō
989	晶		日	12	S		sparkle	ショウ shō
990	焼	燒	火	12	4		bake	ショウ、や-く、や-ける shō, ya-ku, ya-keru
991	焦		火	12	S		char	ショウ、こ-げる、こ-がす、こ-がれる、あせ-る shō, ko-geru, ko-gasu, ko-gareru, ase-ru
992	硝		石	12	S		nitrate	ショウ shō
993	粧		米	12	S		cosmetics	ショウ shō
994	詔		言	12	S		imperial edict	ショウ、みことのり shō, mikotonori
995	証	證	言	12	5		evidence	ショウ shō
996	象		豕	12	5		elephant	ショウ、ゾウ shō, zō
997	傷		人	13	6		wound	ショウ、きず、いた-む、いた-める shō, kizu, ita-mu, ita-meru
998	奨	奬	大	13	S		exhort	ショウ shō
999	照		火	13	4		illuminate	ショウ、て-る、て-らす、て-れる shō, te-ru, te-rasu, te-reru
1000	詳		言	13	S		detailed	ショウ、くわ-しい shō, kuwa-shii
1001	彰		彡	14	S		patent	ショウ shō
1002	障		阜	14	6		hurt	ショウ、さわ-る shō, sawa-ru
1003	憧		心	15	S	2010	desire	ショウ、あこが-れる shō, akoga-reru
1004	衝		行	15	S		collide	ショウ shō
1005	賞		貝	15	5		prize	ショウ shō
1006	償		人	17	S		reparation	ショウ、つぐな-う shō, tsuguna-u
1007	礁		石	17	S		reef	ショウ shō
1008	鐘		金	20	S		bell	ショウ、かね shō, kane
1009	上		一	3	1		up	ジョウ、（ショウ）、うえ、（うわ）、かみ、あ-げる、あ-がる、のぼ-る、のぼ-せる、のぼ-す jō, (shō), ue, (uwa), kami, a-geru, a-garu, nobo-ru, nobo-seru, nobo-su
1010	丈		一	3	S		length	ジョウ、たけ jō, take
1011	冗		冖	4	S		superfluous	ジョウ jō
1012	条	條	木	7	5		clause	ジョウ jō
1013	状	狀	犬	7	5		form	ジョウ jō
1014	乗	乘	丿	9	3		ride	ジョウ、の-る、の-せる jō, no-ru, no-seru
1015	城		土	9	4		castle	ジョウ、しろ jō, shiro
1016	浄	淨	水	9	S		clean	ジョウ jō
1017	剰	剩	刀	11	S		surplus	ジョウ jō
1018	常		巾	11	5		normal	ジョウ、つね、とこ jō, tsune, toko
1019	情		心	11	5		feelings	ジョウ、（セイ）、なさ-け jō, (sei), nasa-ke
1020	場		土	12	2		place	ジョウ、ば jō, ba
1021	畳	疊	田	12	S		tatami mat	ジョウ、たた-む、たたみ jō, tata-mu, tatami
1022	蒸		艸	13	6		steam	ジョウ、む-す、む-れる、む-らす jō, mu-su, mu-reru, mu-rasu
1023	縄	繩	糸	15	4	1981	straw rope	ジョウ、なわ jō, nawa
1024	壌	壤	土	16	S	1981	lot	ジョウ jō
1025	嬢	孃	女	16	S		lass	ジョウ jō
1026	錠		金	16	S		lock	ジョウ jō
1027	譲	讓	言	20	S		defer	ジョウ、ゆず-る jō, yuzu-ru
1028	醸	釀	酉	20	S		brew	ジョウ、かも-す jō, kamo-su
1029	色		色	6	2		color	ショク、シキ、いろ shoku, shiki, iro
1030	拭		手	9	S	2010	wipe	ショク、ふ-く、ぬぐ-う shoku, fu-ku, nugu-u
1031	食		食	9	2		eat, meal	ショク、（ジキ）、く-う、く-らう、た-べる shoku, (jiki), ku-u, ku-rau, ta-beru
1032	植		木	12	3		plant	ショク、う-える、う-わる shoku, u-eru, u-waru
1033	殖		歹	12	S		augment	ショク、ふ-える、ふ-やす shoku, fu-eru, fu-yasu
1034	飾		食	13	S		decorate	ショク、かざ-る shoku, kaza-ru
1035	触	觸	角	13	S		contact	ショク、ふ-れる、さわ-る shoku, fu-reru, sawa-ru
1036	嘱	囑	口	15	S		entrust	ショク shoku
1037	織		糸	18	5		weave	ショク、シキ、お-る shoku, shiki, o-ru
1038	職		耳	18	5		employment	ショク shoku
1039	辱		辰	10	S		embarrass	ジョク、はずかし-める joku, hazukashi-meru
1040	尻		尸	5	S	2010	buttocks	しり shiri
1041	心		心	4	2		heart	シン、こころ shin, kokoro
1042	申		田	5	3		say	シン、もう-す shin, mō-su
1043	伸		人	7	S		lengthen	シン、の-びる、の-ばす、の-べる shin, no-biru, no-basu, no-beru
1044	臣		臣	7	4		retainer	シン、ジン shin, jin
1045	芯		艸	7	S	2010	core	シン shin
1046	身		身	7	3		body	シン、み shin, mi
1047	辛		辛	7	S		spicy	シン、から-い shin, kara-i
1048	侵		人	9	S		encroach	シン、おか-す shin, oka-su
1049	信		人	9	4		trust	シン shin
1050	津		水	9	S		haven	シン、つ shin, tsu
1051	神	神	示	9	3		god	シン、ジン、かみ、（かん）、（こう） shin, jin, kami, (kan), (kō)
1052	唇		口	10	S	1981	lips	シン、くちびる shin, kuchibiru
1053	娠		女	10	S		with child	シン shin
1054	振		手	10	S		shake	シン、ふ-る、ふ-るう、ふ-れる shin, fu-ru, fu-rū, fu-reru
1055	浸		水	10	S		immersed	シン、ひた-す、ひた-る shin, hita-su, hita-ru
1056	真	眞	目	10	3		true	シン、ま shin, ma
1057	針		金	10	6		needle	シン、はり shin, hari
1058	深		水	11	3		deep	シン、ふか-い、ふか-まる、ふか-める shin, fuka-i, fuka-maru, fuka-meru
1059	紳		糸	11	S		sire	シン shin
1060	進		辵	11	3		advance	シン、すす-む、すす-める shin, susu-mu, susu-meru
1061	森		木	12	1		forest	シン、もり shin, mori
1062	診		言	12	S		checkup	シン、み-る shin, mi-ru
1063	寝	寢	宀	13	S		lie down	シン、ね-る、ね-かす shin, ne-ru, ne-kasu
1064	慎	愼	心	13	S		humility	シン、つつし-む shin, tsutsushi-mu
1065	新		斤	13	2		new	シン、あたら-しい、あら-た、にい shin, atara-shii, ara-ta, nii
1066	審		宀	15	S		examine	シン shin
1067	震		雨	15	S		quake	シン、ふる-う、ふる-える shin, furu-u, furu-eru
1068	薪		艸	16	S		fuel	シン、たきぎ shin, takigi
1069	親		見	16	2		parent	シン、おや、した-しい、した-しむ shin, oya, shita-shii, shita-shimu
1070	人		人	2	1		person	ジン、ニン、ひと jin, nin, hito
1071	刃		刀	3	S		blade	ジン、は jin, ha
1072	仁		人	4	6		humanity	ジン、（ニ） jin, (ni)
1073	尽	盡	皿	6	S		exhaust	ジン、つ-くす、つ-きる、つ-かす jin, tsu-kusu, tsu-kiru, tsu-kasu
1074	迅		辵	6	S		swift	ジン jin
1075	甚		甘	9	S	1981	tremendously	ジン、はなは-だ、はなは-だしい jin, hanaha-da, hanaha-dashii
1076	陣		阜	10	S		camp	ジン jin
1077	尋		寸	12	S		inquire	ジン、たず-ねる jin, tazu-neru
1078	腎		肉	13	S	2010	kidney	ジン jin
1079	須		頁	12	S	2010	by all means	ス su
1080	図	圖	囗	7	2		diagram	ズ、ト、はか-る zu, to, haka-ru
1081	水		水	4	1		water	スイ、みず sui, mizu
1082	吹		口	7	S		blow	スイ、ふ-く sui, fu-ku
1083	垂		土	8	6		droop	スイ、た-れる、た-らす sui, ta-reru, ta-rasu
1084	炊		火	8	S		cook	スイ、た-く sui, ta-ku
1085	帥		巾	9	S		commander	スイ sui
1086	粋	粹	米	10	S		chic	スイ、いき sui, iki
1087	衰		衣	10	S		decline	スイ、おとろ-える sui, otoro-eru
1088	推		手	11	6		infer	スイ、お-す sui, o-su
1089	酔	醉	酉	11	S		drunk	スイ、よ-う sui, yo-u
1090	遂		辵	12	S		consummate	スイ、と-げる sui, to-geru
1091	睡		目	13	S		drowsy	スイ sui
1092	穂	穗	禾	15	S		ear	スイ、ほ sui, ho
1093	随	隨	阜	12	S		follow	ズイ zui
1094	髄	髓	骨	19	S		marrow	ズイ zui
1095	枢	樞	木	8	S		hinge	スウ sū
1096	崇		山	11	S		adore	スウ sū
1097	数	數	攴	13	2		number	スウ、（ス）、かず、かぞ-える sū, (su), kazu, kazo-eru
1098	据		手	11	S	1981	set	す-える、す-わる su-eru, su-waru
1099	杉		木	7	S	1981	cedar	すぎ sugi
1100	裾		衣	13	S	2010	cuff	すそ suso
1101	寸		寸	3	6		measurement	スン sun
1102	瀬	瀨	水	19	S		rapids	せ se
1103	是		日	9	S		just so	ゼ ze
1104	井		二	4	4		well	セイ、（ショウ）、い sei, (shō), i
1105	世		一	5	3		world	セイ、セ、よ sei, se, yo
1106	正		止	5	1		correct	セイ、ショウ、ただ-しい、ただ-す、まさ sei, shō, tada-shii, tada-su, masa
1107	生		生	5	1		life	セイ、ショウ、い-きる、い-かす、い-ける、う-まれる、う-む、お-う、は-える、は-やす、き、なま sei, shō, i-kiru, i-kasu, i-keru, u-mareru, u-mu, o-u, ha-eru, ha-yasu, ki, nama
1108	成		戈	6	4		become	セイ、（ジョウ）、な-る、な-す sei, (jō), na-ru, na-su
1109	西		襾	6	2		west	セイ、サイ、にし sei, sai, nishi
1110	声	聲	耳	7	2		voice	セイ、（ショウ）、こえ、（こわ） sei, (shō), koe, (kowa)
1111	制		刀	8	5		control	セイ sei
1112	姓		女	8	S		surname	セイ、ショウ sei, shō
1113	征		彳	8	S		subjugate	セイ sei
1114	性		心	8	5		gender	セイ、ショウ sei, shō
1115	青		靑	8	1		blue	セイ、（ショウ）、あお、あお-い sei, (shō), ao, ao-i
1116	斉	齊	齊	8	S	1981	adjusted	セイ sei
1117	政		攴	9	5		politics	セイ、（ショウ）、まつりごと sei, (shō), matsurigoto
1118	星		日	9	2		star	セイ、（ショウ）、ほし sei, (shō), hoshi
1119	牲		牛	9	S		animal sacrifice	セイ sei
1120	省		目	9	4		government ministry	セイ、ショウ、かえり-みる、はぶ-く sei, shō, kaeri-miru, habu-ku
1121	凄		冫	10	S	2010	uncanny	セイ sei
1122	逝		辵	10	S	1981	departed	セイ、ゆ-く、い-く sei, yu-ku, i-ku
1123	清		水	11	4		pure	セイ、（ショウ）、きよ-い、きよ-まる、きよ-める sei, (shō), kiyo-i, kiyo-maru, kiyo-meru
1124	盛		皿	11	6		prosper	セイ、（ジョウ）、も-る、さか-る、さか-ん sei, (jō), mo-ru, saka-ru, saka-n
1125	婿		女	12	S		bridegroom	セイ、むこ sei, muko
1126	晴		日	12	2		clear up	セイ、は-れる、は-らす sei, ha-reru, ha-rasu
1127	勢		力	13	5		power	セイ、いきお-い sei, ikio-i
1128	聖		耳	13	6		holy	セイ sei
1129	誠		言	13	6		sincerity	セイ、まこと sei, makoto
1130	精		米	14	5		refined	セイ、（ショウ） sei, (shō)
1131	製		衣	14	5		manufacture	セイ sei
1132	誓		言	14	S		vow	セイ、ちか-う sei, chika-u
1133	静	靜	靑	14	4		quiet	セイ、（ジョウ）、しず、しず-か、しず-まる、しず-める sei, (jō), shizu, shizu-ka, shizu-maru, shizu-meru
1134	請		言	15	S		solicit	セイ、（シン）、こ-う、う-ける sei, (shin), ko-u, u-keru
1135	整		攴	16	3		put in order	セイ、ととの-える、ととの-う sei, totono-eru, totono-u
1136	醒		酉	16	S	2010	be disillusioned	セイ sei
1137	税		禾	12	5		tax	ゼイ zei
1138	夕		夕	3	1		evening	セキ、ゆう seki, yū
1139	斥		斤	5	S		reject	セキ seki
1140	石		石	5	1		stone	セキ、（シャク）、（コク）、いし seki, (shaku), (koku), ishi
1141	赤		赤	7	1		red	セキ、（シャク）、あか、あか-い、あか-らむ、あか-らめる seki, (shaku), aka, aka-i, aka-ramu, aka-rameru
1142	昔		日	8	3		long ago	セキ、（シャク）、むかし seki, (shaku), mukashi
1143	析		木	8	S		chop	セキ seki
1144	席		巾	10	4		seat	セキ seki
1145	脊		肉	10	S	2010	stature	セキ seki
1146	隻		隹	10	S		vessels	セキ seki
1147	惜		心	11	S		pity	セキ、お-しい、お-しむ seki, o-shii, o-shimu
1148	戚		戈	11	S	2010	grieve	セキ seki
1149	責		貝	11	5		blame	セキ、せ-める seki, se-meru
1150	跡		足	13	S		tracks	セキ、あと seki, ato
1151	積		禾	16	4		accumulate	セキ、つ-む、つ-もる seki, tsu-mu, tsu-moru
1152	績		糸	17	5		exploits	セキ seki
1153	籍		竹	20	S		enroll	セキ seki
1154	切		刀	4	2		cut	セツ、（サイ）、き-る、き-れる setsu, (sai), ki-ru, ki-reru
1155	折		手	7	4		fold	セツ、お-る、おり、お-れる setsu, o-ru, ori, o-reru
1156	拙		手	8	S		bungling	セツ、つたな-い setsu, tsutana-i
1157	窃	竊	穴	9	S		stealth	セツ setsu
1158	接		手	11	5		contact	セツ、つ-ぐ setsu, tsu-gu
1159	設		言	11	5		establish	セツ、もう-ける setsu, mō-keru
1160	雪		雨	11	2		snow	セツ、ゆき setsu, yuki
1161	摂	攝	手	13	S		vicarious	セツ setsu
1162	節	節	竹	13	4		node	セツ、（セチ）、ふし setsu, (sechi), fushi
1163	説		言	14	4		theory	セツ、（ゼイ）、と-く setsu, (zei), to-ku
1164	舌		舌	6	6		tongue	ゼツ、した zetsu, shita
1165	絶	絕	糸	12	5		discontinue	ゼツ、た-える、た-やす、た-つ zetsu, ta-eru, ta-yasu, ta-tsu
1166	千		十	3	1		thousand	セン、ち sen, chi
1167	川		巛	3	1		river	セン、かわ sen, kawa
1168	仙		人	5	S	1981	hermit	セン sen
1169	占		卜	5	S		fortune telling	セン、し-める、うらな-う sen, shi-meru, urana-u
1170	先		儿	6	1		previous	セン、さき sen, saki
1171	宣		宀	9	6		proclaim	セン sen
1172	専	專	寸	9	6		specialty	セン、もっぱ-ら sen, moppa-ra
1173	泉		水	9	6		spring	セン、いずみ sen, izumi
1174	浅	淺	水	9	4		shallow	セン、あさ-い sen, asa-i
1175	洗		水	9	6		wash	セン、あら-う sen, ara-u
1176	染		木	9	6		dye	セン、そ-める、そ-まる、し-みる、し-み sen, so-meru, so-maru, shi-miru, shi-mi
1177	扇		戶	10	S		fan	セン、おうぎ sen, ōgi
1178	栓		木	10	S	1981	plug	セン sen
1179	旋		方	11	S		rotation	セン sen
1180	船		舟	11	2		boat	セン、ふね、（ふな） sen, fune, (funa)
1181	戦	戰	戈	13	4		war	セン、いくさ、たたか-う sen, ikusa, tataka-u
1182	煎		火	13	S	2010	broil	セン、い-る sen, i-ru
1183	羨		羊	13	S	2010	envy	セン、うらや-む、うらや-ましい sen, uraya-mu, uraya-mashii
1184	腺		肉	13	S	2010	gland	セン sen
1185	詮		言	13	S	2010	discussion	セン sen
1186	践	踐	足	13	S		tread	セン sen
1187	䇳	箋	竹	12	S	2010	paper	セン sen
1188	銭	錢	金	14	6		coin	セン、ぜに sen, zeni
1189	潜	潛	水	15	S		submerge	セン、ひそ-む、もぐ-る sen, hiso-mu, mogu-ru
1190	線		糸	15	2		line	セン sen
1191	遷		辵	15	S		transition	セン sen
1192	選		辵	15	4		choose	セン、えら-ぶ sen, era-bu
1193	薦		艸	16	S		recommend	セン、すす-める sen, susu-meru
1194	繊	纖	糸	17	S		slender	セン sen
1195	鮮		魚	17	S		fresh	セン、あざ-やか sen, aza-yaka
1196	全		入	6	3		whole	ゼン、まった-く、すべ-て zen, matta-ku, sube-te
1197	前		刀	9	2		in front	ゼン、まえ zen, mae
1198	善		口	12	6		good	ゼン、よ-い zen, yo-i
1199	然		火	12	4		so	ゼン、ネン zen, nen
1200	禅	禪	示	13	S		Zen	ゼン zen
1201	漸		水	14	S		steadily	ゼン zen
1202	膳		肉	16	S	2010	tray	ゼン zen
1203	繕		糸	18	S		darning	ゼン、つくろ-う zen, tsukuro-u
1204	狙		犬	8	S	2010	aim at	ソ、ねら-う so, nera-u
1205	阻		阜	8	S		thwart	ソ、はば-む so, haba-mu
1206	祖	祖	示	9	5		ancestor	ソ so
1207	租		禾	10	S		tariff	ソ so
1208	素		糸	10	5		elementary	ソ、ス so, su
1209	措		手	11	S		set aside	ソ so
1210	粗		米	11	S		coarse	ソ、あら-い so, ara-i
1211	組		糸	11	2		association	ソ、く-む、くみ so, ku-mu, kumi
1212	疎		疋	12	S		alienate	ソ、うと-い、うと-む so, uto-i, uto-mu
1213	訴		言	12	S		sue	ソ、うった-える so, utta-eru
1214	塑		土	13	S		model	ソ so
1215	遡		辵	14	S	2010	go upstream	ソ、さかのぼ-る so, sakanobo-ru
1216	礎		石	18	S		cornerstone	ソ、いしずえ so, ishizue
1217	双	雙	隹	4	S		pair	ソウ、ふた sō, futa
1218	壮	壯	士	6	S		robust	ソウ sō
1219	早		日	6	1		early	ソウ、（サッ）、はや-い、はや-まる、はや-める sō, (sa'), haya-i, haya-maru, haya-meru
1220	争	爭	爪	6	4		conflict	ソウ、あらそ-う sō, araso-u
1221	走		走	7	2		run	ソウ、はし-る sō, hashi-ru
1222	奏		大	9	6		play music	ソウ、かな-でる sō, kana-deru
1223	相		目	9	3		mutual	ソウ、ショウ、あい sō, shō, ai
1224	荘	莊	艸	9	S		villa	ソウ sō
1225	草		艸	9	1		grass	ソウ、くさ sō, kusa
1226	送		辵	9	3		send	ソウ、おく-る sō, oku-ru
1227	倉		人	10	4		warehouse	ソウ、くら sō, kura
1228	捜	搜	手	10	S		search	ソウ、さが-す sō, saga-su
1229	挿	插	手	10	S	1981	insert	ソウ、さ-す sō, sa-su
1230	桑		木	10	S		mulberry	ソウ、くわ sō, kuwa
1231	巣	巢	巛	11	4		nest	ソウ、す sō, su
1232	掃		手	11	S		sweep	ソウ、は-く sō, ha-ku
1233	曹		曰	11	S	1981	cadet	ソウ sō
1234	曽	曾	曰	11	S	2010	formerly	ソウ、（ゾ） sō, (zo)
1235	爽		爻	11	S	2010	refreshing	ソウ、さわ-やか sō, sawa-yaka
1236	窓		穴	11	6		window	ソウ、まど sō, mado
1237	創		刀	12	6		create	ソウ、つく-る sō, tsuku-ru
1238	喪		口	12	S		miss	ソウ、も sō, mo
1239	痩	瘦	疒	12	S	2010	get thin	ソウ、や-せる sō, ya-seru
1240	葬		艸	12	S		interment	ソウ、ほうむ-る sō, hōmu-ru
1241	装	裝	衣	12	6		attire	ソウ、ショウ、よそお-う sō, shō, yosoo-u
1242	僧	僧	人	13	S		Buddhist priest	ソウ sō
1243	想		心	13	3		concept	ソウ、（ソ） sō, (so)
1244	層	層	尸	14	6		stratum	ソウ sō
1245	総	總	糸	14	5		whole	ソウ sō
1246	遭		辵	14	S		encounter	ソウ、あ-う sō, a-u
1247	槽		木	15	S	1981	vat	ソウ sō
1248	踪		足	15	S	2010	remains	ソウ sō
1249	操		手	16	6		maneuver	ソウ、みさお、あやつ-る sō, misao, ayatsu-ru
1250	燥		火	17	S		parch	ソウ sō
1251	霜		雨	17	S		frost	ソウ、しも sō, shimo
1252	騒	騷	馬	18	S		boisterous	ソウ、さわ-ぐ sō, sawa-gu
1253	藻		艸	19	S	1981	seaweed	ソウ、も sō, mo
1254	造		辵	10	5		create	ゾウ、つく-る zō, tsuku-ru
1255	像		人	14	5		statue	ゾウ zō
1256	増	增	土	14	5		increase	ゾウ、ま-す、ふ-える、ふ-やす zō, ma-su, fu-eru, fu-yasu
1257	憎	憎	心	14	S		hate	ゾウ、にく-む、にく-い、にく-らしい、にく-しみ zō, niku-mu, niku-i, niku-rashii, niku-shimi
1258	蔵	藏	艸	15	6		warehouse	ゾウ、くら zō, kura
1259	贈	贈	貝	18	S		presents	ゾウ、（ソウ）、おく-る zō, (sō), oku-ru
1260	臓	臟	肉	19	6		entrails	ゾウ zō
1261	即	卽	卩	7	S		instant	ソク soku
1262	束		木	7	4		bundle	ソク、たば soku, taba
1263	足		足	7	1		foot	ソク、あし、た-りる、た-る、た-す soku, ashi, ta-riru, ta-ru, ta-su
1264	促		人	9	S		stimulate	ソク、うなが-す soku, unaga-su
1265	則		刀	9	5		rule	ソク soku
1266	息		心	10	3		breath	ソク、いき soku, iki
1267	捉		手	10	S	2010	capture	ソク、とら-える soku, tora-eru
1268	速		辵	10	3		fast	ソク、はや-い、はや-める、はや-まる、すみ-やか soku, haya-i, haya-meru, haya-maru, sumi-yaka
1269	側		人	11	4		side	ソク、がわ soku, gawa
1270	測		水	12	5		fathom	ソク、はか-る soku, haka-ru
1271	俗		人	9	S		vulgar	ゾク zoku
1272	族		方	11	3		tribe	ゾク zoku
1273	属	屬	尸	12	5		belong	ゾク zoku
1274	賊		貝	13	S		burglar	ゾク zoku
1275	続	續	糸	13	4		continue	ゾク、つづ-く、つづ-ける zoku, tsuzu-ku, tsuzu-keru
1276	卒		十	8	4		graduate	ソツ sotsu
1277	率		玄	11	5		rate	ソツ、リツ、ひき-いる sotsu, ritsu, hiki-iru
1278	存		子	6	6		suppose	ソン、ゾン son, zon
1279	村		木	7	1		village	ソン、むら son, mura
1280	孫		子	10	4		grandchild	ソン、まご son, mago
1281	尊		寸	12	6		revered	ソン、たっと-い、とうと-い、たっと-ぶ、とうと-ぶ son, tatto-i, tōto-i, tatto-bu, tōto-bu
1282	損		手	13	5		loss	ソン、そこ-なう、そこ-ねる son, soko-nau, soko-neru
1283	遜		辵	14	S	2010	humble	ソン son
1284	他		人	5	3		other	タ、ほか ta, hoka
1285	多		夕	6	2		many	タ、おお-い ta, oo-i
1286	汰		水	7	S	2010	luxury	タ ta
1287	打		手	5	3		hit	ダ、う-つ da, u-tsu
1288	妥		女	7	S		gentle	ダ da
1289	唾		口	11	S	2010	saliva	ダ、つば da, tsuba
1290	堕	墮	土	12	S		degenerate	ダ da
1291	惰		心	12	S		lazy	ダ da
1292	駄		馬	14	S	1981	burdensome	ダ da
1293	太		大	4	2		thick	タイ、タ、ふと-い、ふと-る tai, ta, futo-i, futo-ru
1294	対	對	寸	7	3		opposite	タイ、ツイ tai, tsui
1295	体	體	骨	7	2		body	タイ、テイ、からだ tai, tei, karada
1296	耐		而	9	S		resistant	タイ、た-える tai, ta-eru
1297	待		彳	9	3		wait	タイ、ま-つ tai, ma-tsu
1298	怠		心	9	S		neglect	タイ、おこた-る、なま-ける tai, okota-ru, nama-keru
1299	胎		肉	9	S		womb	タイ tai
1300	退		辵	9	6		retreat	タイ、しりぞ-く、しりぞ-ける tai, shirizo-ku, shirizo-keru
1301	帯	帶	巾	10	4		sash	タイ、お-びる、おび tai, o-biru, obi
1302	泰		水	10	S		peaceful	タイ tai
1303	堆		土	11	S	2010	piled high	タイ tai
1304	袋		衣	11	S		sack	タイ、ふくろ tai, fukuro
1305	逮		辵	11	S		apprehend	タイ tai
1306	替		曰	12	S		exchange	タイ、か-える、か-わる tai, ka-eru, ka-waru
1307	貸		貝	12	5		lend	タイ、か-す tai, ka-su
1308	隊		阜	12	4		group	タイ tai
1309	滞	滯	水	13	S		stagnate	タイ、とどこお-る tai, todokoo-ru
1310	態		心	14	5		condition	タイ tai
1311	戴		戈	17	S	2010	be crowned with	タイ tai
1312	大		大	3	1		large	ダイ、タイ、おお、おお-きい、おお-いに dai, tai, oo, oo-kii, oo-ini
1313	代		人	5	3		substitute	ダイ、タイ、か-わる、か-える、よ、しろ dai, tai, ka-waru, ka-eru, yo, shiro
1314	台	臺	至	5	2		pedestal	ダイ、タイ dai, tai
1315	第		竹	11	3		ordinal number prefix	ダイ dai
1316	題		頁	18	3		topic	ダイ dai
1317	滝	瀧	水	13	S		waterfall	たき taki
1318	宅		宀	6	6		home	タク taku
1319	択	擇	手	7	S		choose	タク taku
1320	沢	澤	水	7	S		swamp	タク、さわ taku, sawa
1321	卓		十	8	S		eminent	タク taku
1322	拓		手	8	S		clear (the land)	タク taku
1323	託		言	10	S		consign	タク taku
1324	濯		水	17	S	1981	laundry	タク taku
1325	諾		言	15	S		consent	ダク daku
1326	濁		水	16	S		voiced	ダク、にご-る、にご-す daku, nigo-ru, nigo-su
1327	但		人	7	S		however	ただ-し tada-shi
1328	達		辵	12	4		attain	タツ tatsu
1329	脱		肉	11	S		undress	ダツ、ぬ-ぐ、ぬ-げる datsu, nu-gu, nu-geru
1330	奪		大	14	S		rob	ダツ、うば-う datsu, uba-u
1331	棚		木	12	S	1981	shelf	たな tana
1332	誰		言	15	S	2010	who (question word)	だれ dare
1333	丹		丶	4	S		cinnabar	タン tan
1334	旦		日	5	S	2010	daybreak	タン、ダン tan, dan
1335	担	擔	手	8	6		shouldering	タン、かつ-ぐ、にな-う tan, katsu-gu, nina-u
1336	単	單	口	9	4		simple	タン tan
1337	炭		火	9	3		charcoal	タン、すみ tan, sumi
1338	胆	膽	肉	9	S		gall bladder	タン tan
1339	探		手	11	6		grope	タン、さぐ-る、さが-す tan, sagu-ru, saga-su
1340	淡		水	11	S		thin	タン、あわ-い tan, awa-i
1341	短		矢	12	3		short	タン、みじか-い tan, mijika-i
1342	嘆	嘆	口	13	S		sigh	タン、なげ-く、なげ-かわしい tan, nage-ku, nage-kawashii
1343	端		立	14	S		edge	タン、はし、は、はた tan, hashi, ha, hata
1344	綻		糸	14	S	2010	rip	タン、ほころ-びる tan, hokoro-biru
1345	誕		言	15	6		nativity	タン tan
1346	鍛		金	17	S		forge	タン、きた-える tan, kita-eru
1347	団	團	囗	6	5		group	ダン、（トン） dan, (ton)
1348	男		田	7	1		male	ダン、ナン、おとこ dan, nan, otoko
1349	段		殳	9	6		steps	ダン dan
1350	断	斷	斤	11	5		cut off	ダン、た-つ、ことわ-る dan, ta-tsu, kotowa-ru
1351	弾	彈	弓	12	S		bullet	ダン、ひ-く、はず-む、たま dan, hi-ku, hazu-mu, tama
1352	暖		日	13	6		warmth	ダン、あたた-か、あたた-かい、あたた-まる、あたた-める dan, atata-ka, atata-kai, atata-maru, atata-meru
1353	談		言	15	3		discuss	ダン dan
1354	壇		土	16	S		podium	ダン、（タン） dan, (tan)
1355	地		土	6	2		ground	チ、ジ chi, ji
1356	池		水	6	2		pond	チ、いけ chi, ike
1357	知		矢	8	2		know	チ、し-る chi, shi-ru
1358	値		人	10	6		value	チ、ね、あたい chi, ne, atai
1359	恥		心	10	S		shame	チ、は-じる、はじ、は-じらう、は-ずかしい chi, ha-jiru, haji, ha-jirau, ha-zukashii
1360	致		至	10	S		(to) do	チ、いた-す chi, ita-su
1361	遅	遲	辵	12	S		slow	チ、おく-れる、おく-らす、おそ-い chi, oku-reru, oku-rasu, oso-i
1362	痴	癡	疒	13	S		stupid	チ chi
1363	稚		禾	13	S		immature	チ chi
1364	置		网	13	4		put	チ、お-く chi, o-ku
1365	緻		糸	16	S	2010	fine (not coarse)	チ chi
1366	竹		竹	6	1		bamboo	チク、たけ chiku, take
1367	畜		田	10	S		livestock	チク chiku
1368	逐		辵	10	S		pursue	チク chiku
1369	蓄		艸	13	S		amass	チク、たくわ-える chiku, takuwa-eru
1370	築		竹	16	5		fabricate	チク、きず-く chiku, kizu-ku
1371	秩		禾	10	S		regularity	チツ chitsu
1372	窒		穴	11	S		plug up	チツ chitsu
1373	茶		艸	9	2		tea	チャ、サ cha, sa
1374	着		羊	12	3		wear	チャク、（ジャク）、き-る、き-せる、つ-く、つ-ける chaku, (jaku), ki-ru, ki-seru, tsu-ku, tsu-keru
1375	嫡		女	14	S		legitimate wife	チャク chaku
1376	中		丨	4	1		middle	チュウ、（ジュウ）、なか chū, (jū), naka
1377	仲		人	6	4		relationship	チュウ、なか chū, naka
1378	虫	蟲	虫	6	1		insect	チュウ、むし chū, mushi
1379	沖		水	7	4		open sea	チュウ、おき chū, oki
1380	宙		宀	8	6		mid-air	チュウ chū
1381	忠		心	8	6		loyalty	チュウ chū
1382	抽		手	8	S		pluck	チュウ chū
1383	注		水	8	3		pour	チュウ、そそ-ぐ chū, soso-gu
1384	昼	晝	日	9	2		daytime	チュウ、ひる chū, hiru
1385	柱		木	9	3		pillar	チュウ、はしら chū, hashira
1386	衷		衣	9	S		inmost	チュウ chū
1387	酎		酉	10	S	2010	sake	チュウ chū
1388	鋳	鑄	金	15	S		casting	チュウ、い-る chū, i-ru
1389	駐		馬	15	S		stop-over	チュウ chū
1390	著	著	艸	11	6		renowned	チョ、あらわ-す、いちじる-しい cho, arawa-su, ichijiru-shii
1391	貯		貝	12	5		savings	チョ cho
1392	丁		一	2	3		ward	チョウ、テイ chō, tei
1393	弔		弓	4	S		condolences	チョウ、とむら-う chō, tomura-u
1394	庁	廳	广	5	6		government office	チョウ chō
1395	兆		儿	6	4		portent, trillion	チョウ、きざ-す、きざ-し chō, kiza-su, kiza-shi
1396	町		田	7	1		town	チョウ、まち chō, machi
1397	長		長	8	2		long	チョウ、なが-い chō, naga-i
1398	挑		手	9	S	1981	challenge	チョウ、いど-む chō, ido-mu
1399	帳		巾	11	3		account book	チョウ chō
1400	張		弓	11	5		stretch	チョウ、は-る chō, ha-ru
1401	彫		彡	11	S		carve	チョウ、ほ-る chō, ho-ru
1402	眺		目	11	S	1981	stare	チョウ、なが-める chō, naga-meru
1403	釣		金	11	S	1981	angling	チョウ、つ-る chō, tsu-ru
1404	頂		頁	11	6		place on the head	チョウ、いただ-く、いただき chō, itada-ku, itadaki
1405	鳥		鳥	11	2		bird	チョウ、とり chō, tori
1406	朝		月	12	2		morning	チョウ、あさ chō, asa
1407	貼		貝	12	S	2010	paste	チョウ、は-る chō, ha-ru
1408	超		走	12	S		transcend	チョウ、こ-える、こ-す chō, ko-eru, ko-su
1409	腸		肉	13	6		intestines	チョウ chō
1410	跳		足	13	S		hop	チョウ、は-ねる、と-ぶ chō, ha-neru, to-bu
1411	徴	徵	彳	14	S		indications	チョウ chō
1412	嘲		口	15	S	2010	ridicule	チョウ、あざけ-る chō, azake-ru
1413	潮		水	15	6		tide	チョウ、しお chō, shio
1414	澄		水	15	S		lucidity	チョウ、す-む、す-ます chō, su-mu, su-masu
1415	調		言	15	3		investigate	チョウ、しら-べる、ととの-う、ととの-える chō, shira-beru, totono-u, totono-eru
1416	聴	聽	耳	17	S		listen	チョウ、き-く chō, ki-ku
1417	懲	懲	心	18	S		penal	チョウ、こ-りる、こ-らす、こ-らしめる chō, ko-riru, ko-rasu, ko-rashimeru
1418	直		目	8	2		straight	チョク、ジキ、ただ-ちに、なお-す、なお-る choku, jiki, tada-chini, nao-su, nao-ru
1419	勅	敕	力	9	S		imperial order	チョク choku
1420	捗		手	10	S	2010	make progress	チョク choku
1421	沈		水	7	S		sink	チン、しず-む、しず-める chin, shizu-mu, shizu-meru
1422	珍		玉	9	S		rare	チン、めずら-しい chin, mezura-shii
1423	朕		月	10	S		majestic plural	チン chin
1424	陳		阜	11	S		exhibit	チン chin
1425	賃		貝	13	6		fare	チン chin
1426	鎮	鎭	金	18	S		tranquilize	チン、しず-める、しず-まる chin, shizu-meru, shizu-maru
1427	追		辵	9	3		follow	ツイ、お-う tsui, o-u
1428	椎		木	12	S	2010	oak	ツイ tsui
1429	墜		土	15	S		crash	ツイ tsui
1430	通		辵	10	2		pass through	ツウ、（ツ）、とお-る、とお-す、かよ-う tsū, (tsu), too-ru, too-su, kayo-u
1431	痛		疒	12	6		pain	ツウ、いた-い、いた-む、いた-める tsū, ita-i, ita-mu, ita-meru
1432	塚	塚	土	12	S	1981	hillock	つか tsuka
1433	漬		水	14	S	1981	pickling	つ-ける、つ-かる tsu-keru, tsu-karu
1434	坪		土	8	S		two-mat area	つぼ tsubo
1435	爪		爪	4	S	2010	claw	つめ、（つま） tsume, (tsuma)
1436	鶴		鳥	21	S	2010	crane	つる tsuru
1437	低		人	7	4		low	テイ、ひく-い、ひく-める、ひく-まる tei, hiku-i, hiku-meru, hiku-maru
1438	呈		口	7	S		display	テイ tei
1439	廷		廴	7	S		courts	テイ tei
1440	弟		弓	7	2		younger brother	テイ、（ダイ）、（デ）、おとうと tei, (dai), (de), otōto
1441	定		宀	8	3		decide	テイ、ジョウ、さだ-める、さだ-まる、さだ-か tei, jō, sada-meru, sada-maru, sada-ka
1442	底		广	8	4		bottom	テイ、そこ tei, soko
1443	抵		手	8	S		resist	テイ tei
1444	邸		邑	8	S		residence	テイ tei
1445	亭		亠	9	S	1981	pavilion	テイ tei
1446	貞		貝	9	S		upright	テイ tei
1447	帝		巾	9	S		sovereign	テイ tei
1448	訂		言	9	S		revise	テイ tei
1449	庭		广	10	3		garden	テイ、にわ tei, niwa
1450	逓	遞	辵	10	S		relay	テイ tei
1451	停		人	11	5		halt	テイ tei
1452	偵		人	11	S	1981	spy	テイ tei
1453	堤		土	12	S		dike	テイ、つつみ tei, tsutsumi
1454	提		手	12	5		present	テイ、さ-げる tei, sa-geru
1455	程		禾	12	5		extent	テイ、ほど tei, hodo
1456	艇		舟	13	S		rowboat	テイ tei
1457	締		糸	15	S		tighten	テイ、し-まる、し-める tei, shi-maru, shi-meru
1458	諦		言	16	S	2010	abandon	テイ、あきら-める tei, akira-meru
1459	泥		水	8	S	1981	mud	デイ、どろ dei, doro
1460	的		白	8	4		target	テキ、まと teki, mato
1461	笛		竹	11	3		flute	テキ、ふえ teki, fue
1462	摘		手	14	S		pinch	テキ、つ-む teki, tsu-mu
1463	滴		水	14	S		drip	テキ、しずく、したた-る teki, shizuku, shitata-ru
1464	適		辵	14	5		suitable	テキ teki
1465	敵		攴	15	6		enemy	テキ、かたき teki, kataki
1466	溺		水	13	S	2010	drown	デキ、おぼ-れる deki, obo-reru
1467	迭		辵	8	S		transfer	テツ tetsu
1468	哲		口	10	S		philosophy	テツ tetsu
1469	鉄	鐵	金	13	3		iron	テツ tetsu
1470	徹		彳	15	S		penetrate	テツ tetsu
1471	撤		手	15	S		remove	テツ tetsu
1472	天		大	4	1		heaven	テン、あめ、（あま） ten, ame, (ama)
1473	典		八	8	4		code	テン ten
1474	店		广	8	2		shop	テン、みせ ten, mise
1475	点	點	黑	9	2		point	テン ten
1476	展		尸	10	6		expand	テン ten
1477	添		水	11	S		annexed	テン、そ-える、そ-う ten, so-eru, so-u
1478	転	轉	車	11	3		revolve	テン、ころ-がる、ころ-げる、ころ-がす、ころ-ぶ ten, koro-garu, koro-geru, koro-gasu, koro-bu
1479	塡		土	13	S	2010	fill in	テン ten
1480	田		田	5	1		rice paddy	デン、た den, ta
1481	伝	傳	人	6	4		transmit	デン、つた-わる、つた-える、つた-う den, tsuta-waru, tsuta-eru, tsuta-u
1482	殿		殳	13	S		Mr.	デン、テン、との、どの den, ten, tono, dono
1483	電		雨	13	2		electricity	デン den
1484	斗		斗	4	S		dipper	ト to
1485	吐		口	6	S		spit	ト、は-く to, ha-ku
1486	妬		女	8	S	2010	jealousy	ト、ねた-む to, neta-mu
1487	徒		彳	10	4		junior	ト to
1488	途		辵	10	S		route	ト to
1489	都	都	邑	11	3		metropolis	ト、ツ、みやこ to, tsu, miyako
1490	渡		水	12	S		transit	ト、わた-る、わた-す to, wata-ru, wata-su
1491	塗		土	13	S		paint	ト、ぬ-る to, nu-ru
1492	賭		貝	16	S	2010	gamble	ト、か-ける to, ka-keru
1493	土		土	3	1		soil	ド、ト、つち do, to, tsuchi
1494	奴		女	5	S		guy	ド do
1495	努		力	7	4		toil	ド、つと-める do, tsuto-meru
1496	度		广	9	3		degrees	ド、（ト）、（タク）、たび do, (to), (taku), tabi
1497	怒		心	9	S		angry	ド、いか-る、おこ-る do, ika-ru, oko-ru
1498	刀		刀	2	2		sword	トウ、かたな tō, katana
1499	冬		冫	5	2		winter	トウ、ふゆ tō, fuyu
1500	灯	燈	火	6	4		lamp	トウ、ひ tō, hi
1501	当	當	田	6	2		hit	トウ、あ-たる、あ-てる tō, a-taru, a-teru
1502	投		手	7	3		throw	トウ、な-げる tō, na-geru
1503	豆		豆	7	3		bean	トウ、（ズ）、まめ tō, (zu), mame
1504	東		木	8	2		east	トウ、ひがし tō, higashi
1505	到		刀	8	S		arrival	トウ tō
1506	逃		辵	9	S		escape	トウ、に-げる、に-がす、のが-す、のが-れる tō, ni-geru, ni-gasu, noga-su, noga-reru
1507	倒		人	10	S		overthrow	トウ、たお-れる、たお-す tō, tao-reru, tao-su
1508	凍		冫	10	S		frozen	トウ、こお-る、こご-える tō, koo-ru, kogo-eru
1509	唐		口	10	S		T'ang	トウ、から tō, kara
1510	島		山	10	3		island	トウ、しま tō, shima
1511	桃		木	10	S		peach tree	トウ、もも tō, momo
1512	討		言	10	6		chastise	トウ、う-つ tō, u-tsu
1513	透		辵	10	S		transparent	トウ、す-く、す-かす、す-ける tō, su-ku, su-kasu, su-keru
1514	党	黨	黑	10	6		group	トウ tō
1515	悼		心	11	S		lament	トウ、いた-む tō, ita-mu
1516	盗	盜	皿	11	S		steal	トウ、ぬす-む tō, nusu-mu
1517	陶		阜	11	S		pottery	トウ tō
1518	塔		土	12	S		pagoda	トウ tō
1519	搭		手	12	S	1981	board	トウ tō
1520	棟		木	12	S	1981	ridgepole	トウ、むね、（むな） tō, mune, (muna)
1521	湯		水	12	3		hot water	トウ、ゆ tō, yu
1522	痘		疒	12	S		pox	トウ tō
1523	登		癶	12	3		climb	トウ、ト、のぼ-る tō, to, nobo-ru
1524	答		竹	12	2		answer	トウ、こた-える、こた-え tō, kota-eru, kota-e
1525	等		竹	12	3		class	トウ、ひと-しい tō, hito-shii
1526	筒		竹	12	S		cylinder	トウ、つつ tō, tsutsu
1527	統		糸	12	5		unite	トウ、す-べる tō, su-beru
1528	稲	稻	禾	14	S		rice plant	トウ、いね、（いな） tō, ine, (ina)
1529	踏		足	15	S		step	トウ、ふ-む、ふ-まえる tō, fu-mu, fu-maeru
1530	糖		米	16	6		sugar	トウ tō
1531	頭		頁	16	2		head	トウ、ズ、（ト）、あたま、かしら tō, zu, (to), atama, kashira
1532	謄		言	17	S		mimeograph	トウ tō
1533	藤		艸	18	S	2010	wisteria	トウ、ふじ tō, fuji
1534	闘	鬭	鬥	18	S		fight	トウ、たたか-う tō, tataka-u
1535	騰		馬	20	S		inflation	トウ tō
1536	同		口	6	2		same	ドウ、おな-じ dō, ona-ji
1537	洞		水	9	S	1981	den	ドウ、ほら dō, hora
1538	胴		肉	10	S		trunk	ドウ dō
1539	動		力	11	3		move	ドウ、うご-く、うご-かす dō, ugo-ku, ugo-kasu
1540	堂		土	11	5		public chamber	ドウ dō
1541	童		立	12	3		juvenile	ドウ、わらべ dō, warabe
1542	道		辵	12	2		road	ドウ、（トウ）、みち dō, (tō), michi
1543	働		人	13	4		work	ドウ、はたら-く dō, hatara-ku
1544	銅		金	14	5		copper	ドウ dō
1545	導		寸	15	5		guide	ドウ、みちび-く dō, michibi-ku
1546	瞳		目	17	S	2010	pupil	ドウ、ひとみ dō, hitomi
1547	峠		山	9	S		mountain peak	とうげ tōge
1548	匿		匸	10	S		hide	トク toku
1549	特		牛	10	4		special	トク toku
1550	得		彳	11	5		acquire	トク、え-る、う-る toku, e-ru, u-ru
1551	督		目	13	S		coach	トク toku
1552	徳	德	彳	14	4		benevolence	トク toku
1553	篤		竹	16	S		fervent	トク toku
1554	毒		毋	8	5		poison	ドク doku
1555	独	獨	犬	9	5		alone	ドク、ひと-り doku, hito-ri
1556	読	讀	言	14	2		read	ドク、トク、（トウ）、よ-む doku, toku, (tō), yo-mu
1557	栃		木	9	4	2010	horse chestnut	（とち） (tochi)
1558	凸		凵	5	S	1981	convex	トツ totsu
1559	突	突	穴	8	S		stab	トツ、つ-く totsu, tsu-ku
1560	届	屆	尸	8	6		deliver	とど-ける、とど-く todo-keru, todo-ku
1561	屯		屮	4	S	1981	barracks	トン ton
1562	豚		豕	11	S		pork	トン、ぶた ton, buta
1563	頓		頁	13	S	2010	suddenly	トン ton
1564	貪		貝	11	S	2010	covet	ドン、むさぼ-る don, musabo-ru
1565	鈍		金	12	S		dull	ドン、にぶ-い、にぶ-る don, nibu-i, nibu-ru
1566	曇		日	16	S		cloudy weather	ドン、くも-る don, kumo-ru
1567	丼		丶	5	S	2010	bowl of food	どんぶり、（どん） donburi, (don)
1568	那		邑	7	S	2010	what	ナ na
1569	奈		大	8	4	2010	what	ナ na
1570	内		入	4	2		inside	ナイ、（ダイ）、うち nai, (dai), uchi
1571	梨		木	11	4	2010	pear tree	なし nashi
1572	謎		言	17	S	2010	riddle	なぞ nazo
1573	鍋		金	17	S	2010	pot	なべ nabe
1574	南		十	9	2		south	ナン、（ナ）、みなみ nan, (na), minami
1575	軟		車	11	S		soft	ナン、やわ-らか、やわ-らかい nan, yawa-raka, yawa-rakai
1576	難	難	隹	18	6		difficult	ナン、かた-い、むずか-しい nan, kata-i, muzuka-shii
1577	二		二	2	1		two	ニ、ふた、ふた-つ ni, futa, futa-tsu
1578	尼		尸	5	S		nun	ニ、あま ni, ama
1579	弐	貳	貝	6	S		two (falsification prevention)	ニ ni
1580	匂		勹	4	S	2010	scent	にお-う nio-u
1581	肉		肉	6	2		meat	ニク niku
1582	虹		虫	9	S	2010	rainbow	にじ niji
1583	日		日	4	1		day	ニチ、ジツ、ひ、か nichi, jitsu, hi, ka
1584	入		入	2	1		enter	ニュウ、い-る、い-れる、はい-る nyū, i-ru, i-reru, hai-ru
1585	乳		乙	8	6		milk	ニュウ、ちち、ち nyū, chichi, chi
1586	尿		尸	7	S		urine	ニョウ nyō
1587	任		人	6	5		responsibility	ニン、まか-せる、まか-す nin, maka-seru, maka-su
1588	妊		女	7	S		pregnancy	ニン nin
1589	忍		心	7	S		endure	ニン、しの-ぶ、しの-ばせる nin, shino-bu, shino-baseru
1590	認		言	14	6		recognize	ニン、みと-める nin, mito-meru
1591	寧		宀	14	S		rather	ネイ nei
1592	熱		火	15	4		heat	ネツ、あつ-い netsu, atsu-i
1593	年		干	6	1		year	ネン、とし nen, toshi
1594	念		心	8	4		thought	ネン nen
1595	捻		手	11	S	2010	twist	ネン nen
1596	粘		米	11	S		sticky	ネン、ねば-る nen, neba-ru
1597	燃		火	16	5		burn	ネン、も-える、も-やす、も-す nen, mo-eru, mo-yasu, mo-su
1598	悩	惱	心	10	S		trouble	ノウ、なや-む、なや-ます nō, naya-mu, naya-masu
1599	納		糸	10	6		settlement	ノウ、（ナッ）、（ナ）、（ナン）、（トウ）、おさ-める、おさ-まる nō, (na'), (na), (nan), (tō), osa-meru, osa-maru
1600	能		肉	10	5		ability	ノウ nō
1601	脳	腦	肉	11	6		brain	ノウ nō
1602	農		辰	13	3		farming	ノウ nō
1603	濃		水	16	S		concentrated	ノウ、こ-い nō, ko-i
1604	把		手	7	S	1981	grasp	ハ ha
1605	波		水	8	3		wave	ハ、なみ ha, nami
1606	派		水	9	6		sect	ハ ha
1607	破		石	10	5		rend	ハ、やぶ-る、やぶ-れる ha, yabu-ru, yabu-reru
1608	覇	霸	雨	19	S	1981	hegemony	ハ ha
1609	馬		馬	10	2		horse	バ、うま、（ま） ba, uma, (ma)
1610	婆		女	11	S		old woman	バ ba
1611	罵		网	15	S	2010	insult	バ、ののし-る ba, nonoshi-ru
1612	拝	拜	手	8	6		worship	ハイ、おが-む hai, oga-mu
1613	杯		木	8	S		counter for cupfuls	ハイ、さかずき hai, sakazuki
1614	背		肉	9	6		back	ハイ、せ、せい、そむ-く、そむ-ける hai, se, sei, somu-ku, somu-keru
1615	肺		肉	9	6		lungs	ハイ hai
1616	俳		人	10	6		haiku	ハイ hai
1617	配		酉	10	3		distribute	ハイ、くば-る hai, kuba-ru
1618	排		手	11	S		repudiate	ハイ hai
1619	敗		攴	11	4		failure	ハイ、やぶ-れる hai, yabu-reru
1620	廃	廢	广	12	S		abolish	ハイ、すた-れる、すた-る hai, suta-reru, suta-ru
1621	輩		車	15	S		comrade	ハイ hai
1622	売	賣	貝	7	2		sell	バイ、う-る、う-れる bai, u-ru, u-reru
1623	倍		人	10	3		double	バイ bai
1624	梅	梅	木	10	4		ume (Japanese apricot)	バイ、うめ bai, ume
1625	培		土	11	S		cultivate	バイ、つちか-う bai, tsuchika-u
1626	陪		阜	11	S		obeisance	バイ bai
1627	媒		女	12	S		mediator	バイ bai
1628	買		貝	12	2		buy	バイ、か-う bai, ka-u
1629	賠		貝	15	S		compensation	バイ bai
1630	白		白	5	1		white	ハク、ビャク、しろ、（しら）、しろ-い haku, byaku, shiro, (shira), shiro-i
1631	伯		人	7	S		chief	ハク haku
1632	拍		手	8	S		clap	ハク、（ヒョウ） haku, (hyō)
1633	泊		水	8	S		overnight	ハク、と-まる、と-める haku, to-maru, to-meru
1634	迫		辵	8	S		urge	ハク、せま-る haku, sema-ru
1635	剝		刀	10	S	2010	peel	ハク、は-がす、は-ぐ、は-がれる、は-げる haku, ha-gasu, ha-gu, ha-gareru, ha-geru
1636	舶		舟	11	S		liner	ハク haku
1637	博		十	12	4		Dr.	ハク、（バク） haku, (baku)
1638	薄		艸	16	S		dilute	ハク、うす-い、うす-める、うす-まる、うす-らぐ、うす-れる haku, usu-i, usu-meru, usu-maru, usu-ragu, usu-reru
1639	麦	麥	麥	7	2		wheat	バク、むぎ baku, mugi
1640	漠		水	13	S	1981	vague	バク baku
1641	縛		糸	16	S		truss	バク、しば-る baku, shiba-ru
1642	爆		火	19	S		explode	バク baku
1643	箱		竹	15	3		box	はこ hako
1644	箸		竹	15	S	2010	chopsticks	はし hashi
1645	畑		田	9	3		farm	はた、はたけ hata, hatake
1646	肌		肉	6	S	1981	texture	はだ hada
1647	八		八	2	1		eight	ハチ、や、や-つ、やっ-つ、（よう） hachi, ya, ya-tsu, ya'-tsu, (yō)
1648	鉢		金	13	S	1981	bowl	ハチ、（ハツ） hachi, (hatsu)
1649	発	發	癶	9	3		departure	ハツ、ホツ hatsu, hotsu
1650	髪	髮	髟	14	S		hair of the head	ハツ、かみ hatsu, kami
1651	伐		人	6	S		fell	バツ batsu
1652	抜	拔	手	7	S		slip out	バツ、ぬ-く、ぬ-ける、ぬ-かす、ぬ-かる batsu, nu-ku, nu-keru, nu-kasu, nu-karu
1653	罰		网	14	S		penalty	バツ、バチ batsu, bachi
1654	閥		門	14	S		clique	バツ batsu
1655	反		又	4	3		anti-	ハン、（ホン）、（タン）、そ-る、そ-らす han, (hon), (tan), so-ru, so-rasu
1656	半		十	5	2		half	ハン、なか-ば han, naka-ba
1657	氾		水	5	S	2010	spread out	ハン han
1658	犯		犬	5	5		crime	ハン、おか-す han, oka-su
1659	帆		巾	6	S		sail	ハン、ほ han, ho
1660	汎		水	6	S	2010	pan-	ハン han
1661	伴		人	7	S		consort	ハン、バン、ともな-う han, ban, tomona-u
1662	判		刀	7	5		judge	ハン、バン han, ban
1663	坂		土	7	3		slope	ハン、さか han, saka
1664	阪		阜	7	4	2010	heights	ハン han
1665	板		木	8	3		board	ハン、バン、いた han, ban, ita
1666	版		片	8	5		printing block	ハン han
1667	班		玉	10	6		squad	ハン han
1668	畔		田	10	S		paddy-ridge	ハン han
1669	般		舟	10	S		generally	ハン han
1670	販		貝	11	S		marketing	ハン han
1671	斑		文	12	S	2010	blemish	ハン han
1672	飯		食	12	4		meal	ハン、めし han, meshi
1673	搬		手	13	S		conveyor	ハン han
1674	煩		火	13	S		anxiety	ハン、（ボン）、わずら-う、わずら-わす han, (bon), wazura-u, wazura-wasu
1675	頒		頁	13	S		partition	ハン han
1676	範		竹	15	S		pattern	ハン han
1677	繁	繁	糸	16	S		luxuriant	ハン han
1678	藩		艸	18	S		clan	ハン han
1679	晩	晚	日	12	6		nightfall	バン ban
1680	番		田	12	2		one's turn	バン ban
1681	蛮	蠻	虫	12	S		barbarian	バン ban
1682	盤		皿	15	S		tray	バン ban
1683	比		比	4	5		compare	ヒ、くら-べる hi, kura-beru
1684	皮		皮	5	3		skin	ヒ、かわ hi, kawa
1685	妃		女	6	S		queen	ヒ hi
1686	否		口	7	6		negate	ヒ、いな hi, ina
1687	批		手	7	6		criticism	ヒ hi
1688	彼		彳	8	S		he	ヒ、かれ、（かの） hi, kare, (kano)
1689	披		手	8	S	1981	expose	ヒ hi
1690	肥		肉	8	5		fertilizer	ヒ、こ-える、こえ、こ-やす、こ-やし hi, ko-eru, koe, ko-yasu, ko-yashi
1691	非		非	8	5		negative	ヒ hi
1692	卑	卑	十	9	S		lowly	ヒ、いや-しい、いや-しむ、いや-しめる hi, iya-shii, iya-shimu, iya-shimeru
1693	飛		飛	9	4		fly	ヒ、と-ぶ、と-ばす hi, to-bu, to-basu
1694	疲		疒	10	S		exhausted	ヒ、つか-れる hi, tsuka-reru
1695	秘	祕	示	10	6		secret	ヒ、ひ-める hi, hi-meru
1696	被		衣	10	S		incur	ヒ、こうむ-る hi, kōmu-ru
1697	悲		心	12	3		sad	ヒ、かな-しい、かな-しむ hi, kana-shii, kana-shimu
1698	扉		戶	12	S	1981	front door	ヒ、とびら hi, tobira
1699	費		貝	12	5		expense	ヒ、つい-やす、つい-える hi, tsui-yasu, tsui-eru
1700	碑	碑	石	14	S		tombstone	ヒ hi
1701	罷		网	15	S		quit	ヒ hi
1702	避		辵	16	S		evade	ヒ、さ-ける hi, sa-keru
1703	尾		尸	7	S		tail	ビ、お bi, o
1704	眉		目	9	S	2010	eyebrow	ビ、（ミ）、まゆ bi, (mi), mayu
1705	美		羊	9	3		beauty	ビ、うつく-しい bi, utsuku-shii
1706	備		人	12	5		provide	ビ、そな-える、そな-わる bi, sona-eru, sona-waru
1707	微		彳	13	S		delicate	ビ bi
1708	鼻		鼻	14	3		nose	ビ、はな bi, hana
1709	膝		肉	15	S	2010	knee	ひざ hiza
1710	肘		肉	7	S	2010	elbow	ひじ hiji
1711	匹		匸	4	S		equal	ヒツ、ひき hitsu, hiki
1712	必		心	5	4		without fail	ヒツ、かなら-ず hitsu, kanara-zu
1713	泌		水	8	S		ooze	ヒツ、ヒ hitsu, hi
1714	筆		竹	12	3		writing brush	ヒツ、ふで hitsu, fude
1715	姫		女	10	S		princess	ひめ hime
1716	百		白	6	1		hundred	ヒャク hyaku
1717	氷		水	5	3		ice	ヒョウ、こおり、ひ hyō, koori, hi
1718	表		衣	8	3		express	ヒョウ、おもて、あらわ-す、あらわ-れる hyō, omote, arawa-su, arawa-reru
1719	俵		人	10	6		bag	ヒョウ、たわら hyō, tawara
1720	票		示	11	4		ballot	ヒョウ hyō
1721	評		言	12	5		evaluate	ヒョウ hyō
1722	漂		水	14	S		drift	ヒョウ、ただよ-う hyō, tadayo-u
1723	標		木	15	4		signpost	ヒョウ hyō
1724	苗		艸	8	S		seedling	ビョウ、なえ、（なわ） byō, nae, (nawa)
1725	秒		禾	9	3		second (part of time)	ビョウ byō
1726	病		疒	10	3		sick	ビョウ、（ヘイ）、や-む、やまい byō, (hei), ya-mu, yamai
1727	描		手	11	S		sketch	ビョウ、えが-く、か-く byō, ega-ku, ka-ku
1728	猫		犬	11	S	1981	cat	ビョウ、ねこ byō, neko
1729	品		口	9	3		article	ヒン、しな hin, shina
1730	浜	濱	水	10	S		seacoast	ヒン、はま hin, hama
1731	貧		貝	11	5		poor	ヒン、ビン、まず-しい hin, bin, mazu-shii
1732	賓	賓	貝	15	S		V.I.P.	ヒン hin
1733	頻	頻	頁	17	S	1981	repeatedly	ヒン hin
1734	敏	敏	攴	10	S		cleverness	ビン bin
1735	瓶	甁	瓦	11	S	1981	flower pot	ビン bin
1736	不		一	4	4		non-	フ、ブ fu, bu
1737	夫		大	4	4		husband	フ、（フウ）、おっと fu, (fū), otto
1738	父		父	4	2		father	フ、ちち fu, chichi
1739	付		人	5	4		attach	フ、つ-ける、つ-く fu, tsu-keru, tsu-ku
1740	布		巾	5	5		linen	フ、ぬの fu, nuno
1741	扶		手	7	S		aid	フ fu
1742	府		广	8	4		urban prefecture	フ fu
1743	怖		心	8	S		dreadful	フ、こわ-い fu, kowa-i
1744	阜		阜	8	4	2010	mound	（フ） (fu)
1745	附		阜	8	S		affixed	フ fu
1746	訃		言	9	S	2010	obituary	フ fu
1747	負		貝	9	3		lose	フ、ま-ける、ま-かす、お-う fu, ma-keru, ma-kasu, o-u
1748	赴		走	9	S		proceed	フ、おもむ-く fu, omomu-ku
1749	浮		水	10	S		floating	フ、う-く、う-かれる、う-かぶ、う-かべる fu, u-ku, u-kareru, u-kabu, u-kaberu
1750	婦		女	11	5		lady	フ fu
1751	符		竹	11	S		token	フ fu
1752	富		宀	12	4		rich	フ、（フウ）、と-む、とみ fu, (fū), to-mu, tomi
1753	普		日	12	S		universal	フ fu
1754	腐		肉	14	S		rot	フ、くさ-る、くさ-れる、くさ-らす fu, kusa-ru, kusa-reru, kusa-rasu
1755	敷		攴	15	S		spread	フ、し-く fu, shi-ku
1756	膚		肉	15	S		skin	フ fu
1757	賦		貝	15	S		levy	フ fu
1758	譜		言	19	S		musical score	フ fu
1759	侮	侮	人	8	S		scorn	ブ、あなど-る bu, anado-ru
1760	武		止	8	5		military	ブ、ム bu, mu
1761	部		邑	11	3		part	ブ bu
1762	舞		舛	15	S		dance	ブ、ま-う、まい bu, ma-u, mai
1763	封		寸	9	S		seal	フウ、ホウ fū, hō
1764	風		風	9	2		wind	フウ、（フ）、かぜ、（かざ） fū, (fu), kaze, (kaza)
1765	伏		人	6	S		prostrated	フク、ふ-せる、ふ-す fuku, fu-seru, fu-su
1766	服		月	8	3		clothes	フク fuku
1767	副		刀	11	4		vice	フク fuku
1768	幅		巾	12	S		breadth	フク、はば fuku, haba
1769	復		彳	12	5		again	フク fuku
1770	福	福	示	13	3		luck	フク fuku
1771	腹		肉	13	6		abdomen	フク、はら fuku, hara
1772	複		衣	14	5		duplicate	フク fuku
1773	覆		襾	18	S		capsize	フク、おお-う、くつがえ-す、くつがえ-る fuku, oo-u, kutsugae-su, kutsugae-ru
1774	払	拂	手	5	S		pay	フツ、はら-う futsu, hara-u
1775	沸		水	8	S		seethe	フツ、わ-く、わ-かす futsu, wa-ku, wa-kasu
1776	仏	佛	人	4	5		Buddha	ブツ、ほとけ butsu, hotoke
1777	物		牛	8	3		thing	ブツ、モツ、もの butsu, motsu, mono
1778	粉		米	10	5		flour	フン、こ、こな fun, ko, kona
1779	紛		糸	10	S		distract	フン、まぎ-れる、まぎ-らす、まぎ-らわす、まぎ-らわしい fun, magi-reru, magi-rasu, magi-rawasu, magi-rawashii
1780	雰		雨	12	S	1981	atmosphere	フン fun
1781	噴		口	15	S		erupt	フン、ふ-く fun, fu-ku
1782	墳		土	15	S		tomb	フン fun
1783	憤		心	15	S		aroused	フン、いきどお-る fun, ikidoo-ru
1784	奮		大	16	6		stirred up	フン、ふる-う fun, furu-u
1785	分		刀	4	2		part, minute of time	ブン、フン、ブ、わ-ける、わ-かれる、わ-かる、わ-かつ bun, fun, bu, wa-keru, wa-kareru, wa-karu, wa-katsu
1786	文		文	4	1		writing	ブン、モン、ふみ bun, mon, fumi
1787	聞		耳	14	2		hear	ブン、モン、き-く、き-こえる bun, mon, ki-ku, ki-koeru
1788	丙		一	5	S		third class	ヘイ hei
1789	平		干	5	3		flat	ヘイ、ビョウ、たい-ら、ひら hei, byō, tai-ra, hira
1790	兵		八	7	4		soldier	ヘイ、ヒョウ hei, hyō
1791	併	倂	人	8	S		join	ヘイ、あわ-せる hei, awa-seru
1792	並	竝	立	8	6		line-up	ヘイ、なみ、なら-べる、なら-ぶ、なら-びに hei, nami, nara-beru, nara-bu, nara-bini
1793	柄		木	9	S		design	ヘイ、がら、え hei, gara, e
1794	陛		阜	10	6		highness	ヘイ hei
1795	閉		門	11	6		closed	ヘイ、と-じる、と-ざす、し-める、し-まる hei, to-jiru, to-zasu, shi-meru, shi-maru
1796	塀	塀	土	12	S	1981	fence	ヘイ hei
1797	幣		巾	15	S		cash	ヘイ hei
1798	弊		廾	15	S		abuse	ヘイ hei
1799	蔽		艸	15	S	2010	cover	ヘイ hei
1800	餅	餠	食	15	S	2010	mochi rice cake	ヘイ、もち hei, mochi
1801	米		米	6	2		rice	ベイ、マイ、こめ bei, mai, kome
1802	壁		土	16	S		wall	ヘキ、かべ heki, kabe
1803	璧		玉	18	S	2010	sphere	ヘキ heki
1804	癖		疒	18	S		mannerism	ヘキ、くせ heki, kuse
1805	別		刀	7	4		separate	ベツ、わか-れる betsu, waka-reru
1806	蔑		艸	14	S	2010	ignore	ベツ、さげす-む betsu, sagesu-mu
1807	片		片	4	6		one-sided	ヘン、かた hen, kata
1808	辺	邊	辵	5	4		environs	ヘン、あた-り、べ hen, ata-ri, be
1809	返		辵	7	3		return	ヘン、かえ-す、かえ-る hen, kae-su, kae-ru
1810	変	變	言	9	4		change	ヘン、か-わる、か-える hen, ka-waru, ka-eru
1811	偏		人	11	S		partial	ヘン、かたよ-る hen, katayo-ru
1812	遍		辵	12	S		everywhere	ヘン hen
1813	編		糸	15	5		compile	ヘン、あ-む hen, a-mu
1814	弁	辨 瓣 辯	辛 瓜 辛	5	5		valve	ベン ben
1815	便		人	9	4		convenience	ベン、ビン、たよ-り ben, bin, tayo-ri
1816	勉	勉	力	10	3		exertion	ベン ben
1817	歩	步	止	8	2		walk	ホ、ブ、（フ）、ある-く、あゆ-む ho, bu, (fu), aru-ku, ayu-mu
1818	保		人	9	5		preserve	ホ、たも-つ ho, tamo-tsu
1819	哺		口	10	S	2010	suckle	ホ ho
1820	捕		手	10	S		catch	ホ、と-らえる、と-らわれる、と-る、つか-まえる、つか-まる ho, to-raeru, to-rawareru, to-ru, tsuka-maeru, tsuka-maru
1821	補		衣	12	6		supplement	ホ、おぎな-う ho, ogina-u
1822	舗		舌	15	S		pavement	ホ ho
1823	母		毋	5	2		mother	ボ、はは bo, haha
1824	募		力	12	S		recruit	ボ、つの-る bo, tsuno-ru
1825	墓		土	13	5		grave	ボ、はか bo, haka
1826	慕		心	14	S		pining	ボ、した-う bo, shita-u
1827	暮		日	14	6		livelihood	ボ、く-れる、く-らす bo, ku-reru, ku-rasu
1828	簿		竹	19	S		register	ボ bo
1829	方		方	4	2		direction	ホウ、かた hō, kata
1830	包		勹	5	4		wrap	ホウ、つつ-む hō, tsutsu-mu
1831	芳		艸	7	S		perfume	ホウ、かんば-しい hō, kanba-shii
1832	邦		邑	7	S		home country	ホウ hō
1833	奉		大	8	S		observance	ホウ、（ブ）、たてまつ-る hō, (bu), tatematsu-ru
1834	宝	寶	宀	8	6		treasure	ホウ、たから hō, takara
1835	抱		手	8	S		embrace	ホウ、だ-く、いだ-く、かか-える hō, da-ku, ida-ku, kaka-eru
1836	放		攴	8	3		release	ホウ、はな-す、はな-つ、はな-れる、ほう-る hō, hana-su, hana-tsu, hana-reru, hō-ru
1837	法		水	8	4		method	ホウ、（ハッ）、（ホッ） hō, (ha'), (ho')
1838	泡		水	8	S	1981	bubbles	ホウ、あわ hō, awa
1839	胞		肉	9	S		placenta	ホウ hō
1840	俸		人	10	S	1981	salary	ホウ hō
1841	倣		人	10	S		emulate	ホウ、なら-う hō, nara-u
1842	峰		山	10	S		summit	ホウ、みね hō, mine
1843	砲		石	10	S		cannon	ホウ hō
1844	崩		山	11	S		crumble	ホウ、くず-れる、くず-す hō, kuzu-reru, kuzu-su
1845	訪		言	11	6		visit	ホウ、おとず-れる、たず-ねる hō, otozu-reru, tazu-neru
1846	報		土	12	5		report	ホウ、むく-いる hō, muku-iru
1847	蜂		虫	13	S	2010	bee	ホウ、はち hō, hachi
1848	豊	豐	豆	13	5		bountiful	ホウ、ゆた-か hō, yuta-ka
1849	飽		食	13	S		sated	ホウ、あ-きる、あ-かす hō, a-kiru, a-kasu
1850	褒	襃	衣	15	S	1981	praise	ホウ、ほ-める hō, ho-meru
1851	縫		糸	16	S		sew	ホウ、ぬ-う hō, nu-u
1852	亡		亠	3	6		deceased	ボウ、（モウ）、な-い bō, (mō), na-i
1853	乏		丿	4	S		scarce	ボウ、とぼ-しい bō, tobo-shii
1854	忙		心	6	S		busy	ボウ、いそが-しい bō, isoga-shii
1855	坊		土	7	S		boy	ボウ、（ボッ） bō, (bo')
1856	妨		女	7	S		disturb	ボウ、さまた-げる bō, samata-geru
1857	忘		心	7	6		forget	ボウ、わす-れる bō, wasu-reru
1858	防		阜	7	5		prevent	ボウ、ふせ-ぐ bō, fuse-gu
1859	房		戶	8	S		tassel	ボウ、ふさ bō, fusa
1860	肪		肉	8	S		obese	ボウ bō
1861	某		木	9	S		so-and-so	ボウ bō
1862	冒		冂	9	S		risk	ボウ、おか-す bō, oka-su
1863	剖		刀	10	S		divide	ボウ bō
1864	紡		糸	10	S		spinning	ボウ、つむ-ぐ bō, tsumu-gu
1865	望		月	11	4		hope	ボウ、モウ、のぞ-む bō, mō, nozo-mu
1866	傍		人	12	S		bystander	ボウ、かたわ-ら bō, katawa-ra
1867	帽		巾	12	S		cap	ボウ bō
1868	棒		木	12	6		rod	ボウ bō
1869	貿		貝	12	5		trade	ボウ bō
1870	貌		豸	14	S	2010	appearance	ボウ bō
1871	暴		日	15	5		outburst	ボウ、（バク）、あば-く、あば-れる bō, (baku), aba-ku, aba-reru
1872	膨		肉	16	S		swell	ボウ、ふく-らむ、ふく-れる bō, fuku-ramu, fuku-reru
1873	謀		言	16	S		conspire	ボウ、（ム）、はか-る bō, (mu), haka-ru
1874	頬	頰	頁	15	S	2010	cheek	ほお hoo
1875	北		匕	5	2		north	ホク、きた hoku, kita
1876	木		木	4	1		tree	ボク、モク、き、（こ） boku, moku, ki, (ko)
1877	朴		木	6	S	1981	crude	ボク boku
1878	牧		牛	8	4		breed	ボク、まき boku, maki
1879	睦		目	13	S	2010	harmonious	ボク boku
1880	僕		人	14	S	1981	me	ボク boku
1881	墨	墨	土	14	S		black ink	ボク、すみ boku, sumi
1882	撲		手	15	S		slap	ボク boku
1883	没	沒	水	7	S		drown	ボツ botsu
1884	勃		力	9	S	2010	rise	ボツ botsu
1885	堀		土	11	S	1981	ditch	ほり hori
1886	本		木	5	1		book	ホン、もと hon, moto
1887	奔		大	8	S		bustle	ホン hon
1888	翻	飜	飛	18	S		flip	ホン、ひるがえ-る、ひるがえ-す hon, hirugae-ru, hirugae-su
1889	凡		几	3	S		mediocre	ボン、（ハン） bon, (han)
1890	盆		皿	9	S		basin	ボン bon
1891	麻		麻	11	S		hemp	マ、あさ ma, asa
1892	摩		手	15	S		chafe	マ ma
1893	磨		石	16	S	1981	grind	マ、みが-く ma, miga-ku
1894	魔		鬼	21	S		witch	マ ma
1895	毎	每	毋	6	2		every	マイ mai
1896	妹		女	8	2		younger sister	マイ、いもうと mai, imōto
1897	枚		木	8	6		sheet of...	マイ mai
1898	昧		日	9	S	2010	foolish	マイ mai
1899	埋		土	10	S		bury	マイ、う-める、う-まる、う-もれる mai, u-meru, u-maru, u-moreru
1900	幕		巾	13	6		curtain	マク、バク maku, baku
1901	膜		肉	14	S		membrane	マク maku
1902	枕		木	8	S	2010	pillow	まくら makura
1903	又		又	2	S		or again	また mata
1904	末		木	5	4		end	マツ、バツ、すえ matsu, batsu, sue
1905	抹		手	8	S	1981	rub	マツ matsu
1906	万	萬	艸	3	2		ten thousand	マン、バン man, ban
1907	満	滿	水	12	4		full	マン、み-ちる、み-たす man, mi-chiru, mi-tasu
1908	慢		心	14	S		ridicule	マン man
1909	漫		水	14	S		cartoon	マン man
1910	未		木	5	4		not yet	ミ mi
1911	味		口	8	3		flavor	ミ、あじ、あじ-わう mi, aji, aji-wau
1912	魅		鬼	15	S		fascination	ミ mi
1913	岬		山	8	S	1981	headland	みさき misaki
1914	密		宀	11	6		secrecy	ミツ mitsu
1915	蜜		虫	14	S	2010	honey	ミツ mitsu
1916	脈		肉	10	5		vein	ミャク myaku
1917	妙		女	7	S		exquisite	ミョウ myō
1918	民		氏	5	4		people	ミン、たみ min, tami
1919	眠		目	10	S		sleep	ミン、ねむ-る、ねむ-い min, nemu-ru, nemu-i
1920	矛		矛	5	S		halberd	ム、ほこ mu, hoko
1921	務		力	11	5		duty	ム、つと-める、つと-まる mu, tsuto-meru, tsuto-maru
1922	無		火	12	4		nothing	ム、ブ、な-い mu, bu, na-i
1923	夢		夕	13	5		dream	ム、ゆめ mu, yume
1924	霧		雨	19	S		fog	ム、きり mu, kiri
1925	娘		女	10	S		daughter	むすめ musume
1926	名		口	6	1		name	メイ、ミョウ、な mei, myō, na
1927	命		口	8	3		fate	メイ、ミョウ、いのち mei, myō, inochi
1928	明		日	8	2		bright	メイ、ミョウ、あ-かり、あか-るい、あか-るむ、あか-らむ、あき-らか、あ-ける、あ-く、あ-くる、あ-かす mei, myō, a-kari, aka-rui, aka-rumu, aka-ramu, aki-raka, a-keru, a-ku, a-kuru, a-kasu
1929	迷		辵	9	5		astray	メイ、まよ-う mei, mayo-u
1930	冥		冖	10	S	2010	dark	メイ、ミョウ mei, myō
1931	盟		皿	13	6		alliance	メイ mei
1932	銘		金	14	S		inscription	メイ mei
1933	鳴		鳥	14	2		chirp	メイ、な-く、な-る、な-らす mei, na-ku, na-ru, na-rasu
1934	滅		水	13	S		destroy	メツ、ほろ-びる、ほろ-ぼす metsu, horo-biru, horo-bosu
1935	免	免	儿	8	S		excuse	メン、まぬか-れる men, manuka-reru
1936	面		面	9	3		face	メン、おも、おもて、つら men, omo, omote, tsura
1937	綿		糸	14	5		cotton	メン、わた men, wata
1938	麺	麵	麥	16	S	2010	noodles	メン men
1939	茂		艸	8	S		overgrown	モ、しげ-る mo, shige-ru
1940	模		木	14	6		imitation	モ、ボ mo, bo
1941	毛		毛	4	2		hair	モウ、け mō, ke
1942	妄		女	6	S	1981	delusion	モウ、ボウ mō, bō
1943	盲		目	8	S		blind	モウ mō
1944	耗		耒	10	S		decrease	モウ、（コウ） mō, (kō)
1945	猛		犬	11	S		fierce	モウ mō
1946	網		糸	14	S		netting	モウ、あみ mō, ami
1947	目		目	5	1		eye	モク、（ボク）、め、（ま） moku, (boku), me, (ma)
1948	黙	默	黑	15	S		silence	モク、だま-る moku, dama-ru
1949	門		門	8	2		gates	モン、かど mon, kado
1950	紋		糸	10	S		family crest	モン mon
1951	問		口	11	3		question	モン、と-う、と-い、（とん） mon, to-u, to-i, (ton)
1952	冶		冫	7	S	2010	melting	ヤ ya
1953	夜		夕	8	2		night	ヤ、よ、よる ya, yo, yoru
1954	野		里	11	2		field	ヤ、の ya, no
1955	弥	彌	弓	8	S	2010	all the more	や ya
1956	厄		厂	4	S	1981	unlucky	ヤク yaku
1957	役		彳	7	3		service	ヤク、エキ yaku, eki
1958	約		糸	9	4		promise	ヤク yaku
1959	訳	譯	言	11	6		translate	ヤク、わけ yaku, wake
1960	薬	藥	艸	16	3		medicine	ヤク、くすり yaku, kusuri
1961	躍		足	21	S		leap	ヤク、おど-る yaku, odo-ru
1962	闇		門	17	S	2010	darkness	やみ yami
1963	由		田	5	3		reason	ユ、ユウ、（ユイ）、よし yu, yū, (yui), yoshi
1964	油		水	8	3		oil	ユ、あぶら yu, abura
1965	喩		口	12	S	2010	metaphor	ユ yu
1966	愉		心	12	S		pleasure	ユ yu
1967	諭		言	16	S		rebuke	ユ、さと-す yu, sato-su
1968	輸		車	16	5		transport	ユ yu
1969	癒		疒	18	S	1981	healing	ユ、い-える、い-やす yu, i-eru, i-yasu
1970	唯		口	11	S		solely	ユイ、（イ） yui, (i)
1971	友		又	4	2		friend	ユウ、とも yū, tomo
1972	有		月	6	3		have	ユウ、ウ、あ-る yū, u, a-ru
1973	勇		力	9	4		courage	ユウ、いさ-む yū, isa-mu
1974	幽		幺	9	S		seclude	ユウ yū
1975	悠		心	11	S	1981	permanence	ユウ yū
1976	郵		邑	11	6		mail	ユウ yū
1977	湧		水	12	S	2010	boil	ユウ、わ-く yū, wa-ku
1978	猶		犬	12	S		furthermore	ユウ yū
1979	裕		衣	12	S		abundant	ユウ yū
1980	遊		辵	12	3		play	ユウ、（ユ）、あそ-ぶ yū, (yu), aso-bu
1981	雄		隹	12	S		male	ユウ、お、おす yū, o, osu
1982	誘		言	14	S		entice	ユウ、さそ-う yū, saso-u
1983	憂		心	15	S		melancholy	ユウ、うれ-える、うれ-い、う-い yū, ure-eru, ure-i, u-i
1984	融		虫	16	S		dissolve	ユウ yū
1985	優		人	17	6		superior	ユウ、やさ-しい、すぐ-れる yū, yasa-shii, sugu-reru
1986	与	與	臼	3	S		give	ヨ、あた-える yo, ata-eru
1987	予	豫	豕	4	3		in advance	ヨ yo
1988	余	餘	食	7	5		leave over	ヨ、あま-る、あま-す yo, ama-ru, ama-su
1989	誉	譽	言	13	S		reputation	ヨ、ほま-れ yo, homa-re
1990	預		頁	13	6		deposit	ヨ、あず-ける、あず-かる yo, azu-keru, azu-karu
1991	幼		幺	5	6		infancy	ヨウ、おさな-い yō, osana-i
1992	用		用	5	2		use	ヨウ、もち-いる yō, mochi-iru
1993	羊		羊	6	3		sheep	ヨウ、ひつじ yō, hitsuji
1994	妖		女	7	S	2010	bewitching	ヨウ、あや-しい yō, aya-shii
1995	洋		水	9	3		ocean	ヨウ yō
1996	要		襾	9	4		need	ヨウ、かなめ、い-る yō, kaname, i-ru
1997	容		宀	10	5		contain	ヨウ yō
1998	庸		广	11	S		commonplace	ヨウ yō
1999	揚		手	12	S		hoist	ヨウ、あ-げる、あ-がる yō, a-geru, a-garu
2000	揺	搖	手	12	S		swing	ヨウ、ゆ-れる、ゆ-る、ゆ-らぐ、ゆ-るぐ、ゆ-する、ゆ-さぶる、ゆ-すぶる yō, yu-reru, yu-ru, yu-ragu, yu-rugu, yu-suru, yu-saburu, yu-suburu
2001	葉		艸	12	3		leaf	ヨウ、は yō, ha
2002	陽		阜	12	3		sunshine	ヨウ yō
2003	溶		水	13	S		melt	ヨウ、と-ける、と-かす、と-く yō, to-keru, to-kasu, to-ku
2004	腰		肉	13	S		loins	ヨウ、こし yō, koshi
2005	様	樣	木	14	3		formal title	ヨウ、さま yō, sama
2006	瘍		疒	14	S	2010	boil (medical)	ヨウ yō
2007	踊		足	14	S		jump	ヨウ、おど-る、おど-り yō, odo-ru, odo-ri
2008	窯		穴	15	S		kiln	ヨウ、かま yō, kama
2009	養		食	15	4		foster	ヨウ、やしな-う yō, yashina-u
2010	擁		手	16	S		embrace	ヨウ yō
2011	謡	謠	言	16	S		noh chanting	ヨウ、うたい、うた-う yō, utai, uta-u
2012	曜		日	18	2		day of the week	ヨウ yō
2013	抑		手	7	S		repress	ヨク、おさ-える yoku, osa-eru
2014	沃		水	7	S	2010	fertility	ヨク yoku
2015	浴		水	10	4		bathe	ヨク、あ-びる、あ-びせる yoku, a-biru, a-biseru
2016	欲		欠	11	6		longing	ヨク、ほっ-する、ほ-しい yoku, ho'-suru, ho-shii
2017	翌		羽	11	6		the following	ヨク yoku
2018	翼		羽	17	S		wing	ヨク、つばさ yoku, tsubasa
2019	拉		手	8	S	2010	crush	ラ ra
2020	裸		衣	13	S		naked	ラ、はだか ra, hadaka
2021	羅		网	19	S	1981	gauze	ラ ra
2022	来	來	人	7	2		come	ライ、く-る、きた-る、きた-す rai, ku-ru, kita-ru, kita-su
2023	雷		雨	13	S		thunder	ライ、かみなり rai, kaminari
2024	頼	賴	貝	16	S		trust	ライ、たの-む、たの-もしい、たよ-る rai, tano-mu, tano-moshii, tayo-ru
2025	絡		糸	12	S		entwine	ラク、から-む、から-まる、から-める raku, kara-mu, kara-maru, kara-meru
2026	落		艸	12	3		fall	ラク、お-ちる、お-とす raku, o-chiru, o-tosu
2027	酪		酉	13	S		dairy products	ラク raku
2028	辣		辛	14	S	2010	bitter	ラツ ratsu
2029	乱	亂	乙	7	6		riot	ラン、みだ-れる、みだ-す ran, mida-reru, mida-su
2030	卵		卩	7	6		egg	ラン、たまご ran, tamago
2031	覧	覽	見	17	6		perusal	ラン ran
2032	濫		水	18	S		excessive	ラン ran
2033	藍		艸	18	S	2010	indigo	ラン、あい ran, ai
2034	欄	欄	木	20	S		column	ラン ran
2035	吏		口	6	S		officer	リ ri
2036	利		刀	7	4		profit	リ、き-く ri, ki-ku
2037	里		里	7	2		village	リ、さと ri, sato
2038	理		玉	11	2		reason	リ ri
2039	痢		疒	12	S		diarrhea	リ ri
2040	裏		衣	13	6		back	リ、うら ri, ura
2041	履		尸	15	S		footgear	リ、は-く ri, ha-ku
2042	璃		玉	14	S	2010	glassy	リ ri
2043	離		隹	18	S		detach	リ、はな-れる、はな-す ri, hana-reru, hana-su
2044	陸		阜	11	4		land	リク riku
2045	立		立	5	1		stand up	リツ、（リュウ）、た-つ、た-てる ritsu, (ryū), ta-tsu, ta-teru
2046	律		彳	9	6		law	リツ、（リチ） ritsu, (richi)
2047	慄		心	13	S	2010	fear	リツ ritsu
2048	略		田	11	5		abbreviation	リャク ryaku
2049	柳		木	9	S		willow	リュウ、やなぎ ryū, yanagi
2050	流		水	10	3		stream	リュウ、（ル）、なが-れる、なが-す ryū, (ru), naga-reru, naga-su
2051	留		田	10	5		detain	リュウ、（ル）、と-める、と-まる ryū, (ru), to-meru, to-maru
2052	竜	龍	龍	10	S	1981	dragon	リュウ、たつ ryū, tatsu
2053	粒		米	11	S		grains	リュウ、つぶ ryū, tsubu
2054	隆	隆	阜	11	S		hump	リュウ ryū
2055	硫		石	12	S		sulphur	リュウ ryū
2056	侶		人	9	S	2010	companion	リョ ryo
2057	旅		方	10	3		trip	リョ、たび ryo, tabi
2058	虜	虜	虍	13	S		captive	リョ ryo
2059	慮		心	15	S		prudence	リョ ryo
2060	了		亅	2	S		finish	リョウ ryō
2061	両	兩	入	6	3		both	リョウ ryō
2062	良		艮	7	4		good	リョウ、よ-い ryō, yo-i
2063	料		斗	10	4		fee	リョウ ryō
2064	涼		水	11	S		refreshing	リョウ、すず-しい、すず-む ryō, suzu-shii, suzu-mu
2065	猟	獵	犬	11	S		game-hunting	リョウ ryō
2066	陵		阜	11	S		mausoleum	リョウ、みささぎ ryō, misasagi
2067	量		里	12	4		quantity	リョウ、はか-る ryō, haka-ru
2068	僚		人	14	S		colleague	リョウ ryō
2069	領		頁	14	5		territory	リョウ ryō
2070	寮		宀	15	S		dormitory	リョウ ryō
2071	療		疒	17	S		heal	リョウ ryō
2072	瞭		目	17	S	2010	clear	リョウ ryō
2073	糧		米	18	S		provisions	リョウ、（ロウ）、かて ryō, (rō), kate
2074	力		力	2	1		power	リョク、リキ、ちから ryoku, riki, chikara
2075	緑	綠	糸	14	3		green	リョク、（ロク）、みどり ryoku, (roku), midori
2076	林		木	8	1		woods	リン、はやし rin, hayashi
2077	厘		厂	9	S		thousandth	リン rin
2078	倫		人	10	S		ethics	リン rin
2079	輪		車	15	4		wheel	リン、わ rin, wa
2080	隣		阜	16	S		neighboring	リン、とな-る、となり rin, tona-ru, tonari
2081	臨		臣	18	6		look to	リン、のぞ-む rin, nozo-mu
2082	瑠		玉	14	S	2010	lapis lazuli	ル ru
2083	涙	淚	水	10	S		tears	ルイ、なみだ rui, namida
2084	累		糸	11	S		accumulate	ルイ rui
2085	塁	壘	土	12	S		bases	ルイ rui
2086	類	類	頁	18	4		sort	ルイ、たぐ-い rui, tagu-i
2087	令		人	5	4		orders	レイ rei
2088	礼	禮	示	5	3		thanks	レイ、ライ rei, rai
2089	冷		冫	7	4		cool	レイ、つめ-たい、ひ-える、ひ-や、ひ-やす、ひ-やかす、さ-める、さ-ます rei, tsume-tai, hi-eru, hi-ya, hi-yasu, hi-yakasu, sa-meru, sa-masu
2090	励	勵	力	7	S		encourage	レイ、はげ-む、はげ-ます rei, hage-mu, hage-masu
2091	戻	戾	戶	7	S	1981	re-	レイ、もど-す、もど-る rei, modo-su, modo-ru
2092	例		人	8	4		example	レイ、たと-える rei, tato-eru
2093	鈴		金	13	S		small bell	レイ、リン、すず rei, rin, suzu
2094	零		雨	13	S		zero	レイ rei
2095	霊	靈	雨	15	S		spirits	レイ、リョウ、たま rei, ryō, tama
2096	隷		隶	16	S		slave	レイ rei
2097	齢	齡	齒	17	S		age	レイ rei
2098	麗		鹿	19	S		lovely	レイ、うるわ-しい rei, uruwa-shii
2099	暦	曆	日	14	S		calendar	レキ、こよみ reki, koyomi
2100	歴	歷	止	14	5		curriculum	レキ reki
2101	列		刀	6	3		row	レツ retsu
2102	劣		力	6	S		inferiority	レツ、おと-る retsu, oto-ru
2103	烈		火	10	S		ardent	レツ retsu
2104	裂		衣	12	S		split	レツ、さ-く、さ-ける retsu, sa-ku, sa-keru
2105	恋	戀	心	10	S		romance	レン、こ-う、こい、こい-しい ren, ko-u, koi, koi-shii
2106	連		辵	10	4		take along	レン、つら-なる、つら-ねる、つ-れる ren, tsura-naru, tsura-neru, tsu-reru
2107	廉		广	13	S		bargain	レン ren
2108	練	練	糸	14	3		practice	レン、ね-る ren, ne-ru
2109	錬	鍊	金	16	S		tempering	レン ren
2110	呂		口	7	S	2010	spine	ロ ro
2111	炉	爐	火	8	S		hearth	ロ ro
2112	賂		貝	13	S	2010	bribe	ロ ro
2113	路		足	13	3		road	ロ、じ ro, ji
2114	露		雨	21	S		dew	ロ、（ロウ）、つゆ ro, (rō), tsuyu
2115	老		老	6	4		old man	ロウ、お-いる、ふ-ける rō, o-iru, fu-keru
2116	労	勞	力	7	4		labour	ロウ rō
2117	弄		廾	7	S	2010	tamper with	ロウ、もてあそ-ぶ rō, moteaso-bu
2118	郎	郞	邑	9	S		son	ロウ rō
2119	朗	朗	月	10	6		melodious	ロウ、ほが-らか rō, hoga-raka
2120	浪		水	10	S		wandering	ロウ rō
2121	廊	廊	广	12	S		corridor	ロウ rō
2122	楼	樓	木	13	S		watchtower	ロウ rō
2123	漏		水	14	S		leak	ロウ、も-る、も-れる、も-らす rō, mo-ru, mo-reru, mo-rasu
2124	篭	籠	竹	16	S	2010	basket	ロウ、かご、こ-もる rō, kago, ko-moru
2125	六		八	4	1		six	ロク、む、む-つ、むっ-つ、（むい） roku, mu, mu-tsu, mu'-tsu, (mui)
2126	録	錄	金	16	4		record	ロク roku
2127	麓		鹿	19	S	2010	foot of a mountain	ロク、ふもと roku, fumoto
2128	論		言	15	6		theory	ロン ron
2129	和		口	8	3		peace	ワ、（オ）、やわ-らぐ、やわ-らげる、なご-む、なご-やか wa, (o), yawa-ragu, yawa-rageru, nago-mu, nago-yaka
2130	話		言	13	2		talk	ワ、はな-す、はなし wa, hana-su, hanashi
2131	賄		貝	13	S		bribe, board	ワイ、まかな-う wai, makana-u
2132	脇		肉	10	S	2010	aside	わき waki
2133	惑		心	12	S		beguile	ワク、まど-う waku, mado-u
2134	枠		木	8	S	1981	frame	わく waku
2135	湾	灣	水	12	S		gulf	ワン wan
2136	腕		肉	12	S		arm	ワン、うで wan, ude

== See also ==
- Jōyō kanji
- List of kyōiku kanji
- Table of Japanese kanji radicals
