= Radical 162 =

Chinese character radical

辵
- Radical 162 (U+2FA1)
- 辵 (U+8FB5) "walk"

Pronunciations
- Pinyin: chuò
- Bopomofo: ㄔㄨㄛˋ
- Wade–Giles: ch'o4
- Cantonese Yale: cheuk3
- Jyutping: coek3
- Japanese Kana: チャク chaku (on'yomi)
- Sino-Korean: 착 chak
- Hán-Việt: xước

Names
- Chinese name(s): (辶) 走之底 zǒuzhīdǐ
- Japanese name(s): (辶) 進繞/しんにょう/しんにゅう shinnyō/shinnyū
- Hangul: 쉬엄쉬엄 갈 swieomswieom gal

Stroke order animation

Radical 162 or radical walk (辵部) meaning "walk" is one of the 20 Kangxi radicals (214 radicals in total) composed of 7 strokes. When used as a component, this radical character transforms into ⻍, ⻌, or ⻎ (See #Variant forms).

In the Kangxi Dictionary, there are 381 characters (out of 49,030) to be found under this radical.

辶 (3 strokes), the component form of 辵, is also the 49th indexing component in the Table of Indexing Chinese Character Components predominantly adopted by Simplified Chinese dictionaries published in mainland China, with 辵 listed as its associated indexing component.

== Evolution ==
Small seal script character

Qing dynasty Clerical script

== Derived characters ==
Strokes	Characters
+0	辵 辶^{Component}
+1	辷^{JP}
+2	辸 边^{SC} (=邊) 辺^{JP} (=邊) 辻^{JP} 込^{JP} 辽^{SC} (=遼)
+3	巡 达^{SC} (=達) 辿 迀 迁^{SC} (=遷) 迂 迃 (=迂) 迄 迅 迆 (=迤) 过^{SC} (=過) 迈^{SC} (=邁) 迉
+4	迊 (=匝 → 匚 迎) 迋 迌 迍 迎 迏 运^{SC} (=運) 近 迒 迓 返 迕 迖 迗 还^{SC} (=還) 这^{SC} (=這) 迚 进^{SC} (=進) 远^{SC} (=遠) 违^{SC} (=違) 连^{SC} (=連) 迟^{SC} (=遲) 迬
+5	迠 迡 迢 迣 迤 迥 迦 迧 (=陳 → 阜 / 徇 → 彳) 迨 迩^{SC} (=邇) 迪 迫 迭 迮 迯 (=逃) 述 迱 迲 迳^{SC} (=逕)
+6	迴 迵 迶 迷 迸 迹^{SC/Variant} (=跡 → 足) 迺 (=乃 → 丿) 迻 (=移 → 禾) 迼 追 迾 迿 退 送 适 (also SC form of 適) 逃 逄 逅 逆 逇 逈 (=迥) 选^{SC} (=選) 逊^{SC} (=遜)
+7	逋 逌 逍 逎 透 逐 逑 递^{SC} (=遞) 逓^{JP} (=遞) 途 逕 逖 逗 逘 這 通 逛 逜 逝 逞 速 造 逡 逢 連 逤 逥 (=迴) 逦^{SC} (=邐) 逧
+8	迸 逨 逩 (=奔 → 大) 逪 逫 逬 (=迸) 逭 逮 逯 逰 (=遊) 週 進 逳 逴 逵 逶 逷 逸 逹 (=達) 逺 (=遠) 逻^{SC} (=邏)
+9	逼 逽 逾 逿 遀 (=隋 → 阜 / 隨 → 阜) 遁 遂 遃 遄 遅^{JP} (=遲) 遆 遇 遈 遉 (=偵 → 人) 遊 運 遌 遍 過 遏 遐 遑 遒 道 達 違 遖 遗^{SC} (=遺) 遥^{JP} (=遙)
+10	遘 遙 遚 遛 遜 遝 遞 遟 遠 遡^{JP} (=溯 → 水) 遢 遣 遤 遥^{SC} (=遙)
+11	遦 遧 遨 適 遪 遫 遬 遭 遮 遯 (=遁) 遰 遱 遳 遷
+12	遲 遴 遵 遶 (=繞 → 糸) 遷 選 遹 遺 遻 遼 邆
+13	遽 遾 避 邀 邁 邂 邃 還 邅 邉 (=邊)
+14	邇 邈
+15	邊 邋 邌
+16	邍 (=原 → 厂)
+17	邎
+19	邏 邐
+54	𰻞

== Variant forms ==
Variations of radical 162 (second row) in different CJK scripts.

Written form

This radical character has different forms in different languages.

Traditionally, this radical character is printed with two dots, while in written regular script, only the one-dot form is used.

In post-war Japan, with the reform of the national language (Japanese language), the tōyō kanji (当用漢字) policy was published, with some kanji simplified. This includes the adjustment of characters with radical 162 by replacing the two-dot form ⻍ (4 strokes in dictionaries) with its one-dot form ⻌ (3 strokes in dictionaries) in printing typefaces. This simplification was then inherited by the less mandatory jōyō kanji (常用漢字) policy. This change did not happen among hyōgai kanji (Chinese characters not covered by jōyō kanji). In the 2010 revision of jōyō kanji, however, included several hyōgai kanji in the new version of jōyō kanji table, causing inconsistency in the printing form of radical 162 among commonly used Chinese characters in Japanese. Moreover, in the 1983 version of JIS coded kanji character sets, ⻍ in some hyōgai kanji were also simplified; This change was partially reverted in its newer versions. The 2010 Revised Jōyō Kanji Table stipulates that despite the inconsistency in the printing forms, this radical character should always be written with one dot.

In mainland China, the replacement of the two-dot ⻍ with one-dot ⻌ (3 strokes in dictionaries) happens when the xin zixing (new typeface) was popularized. The change also applies to traditional Chinese characters (e.g. 運) used in mainland China.

In Taiwan's Standard Form of National Characters and Hong Kong's List of Graphemes of Commonly-Used Chinese Characters, the one-dot form with two twists ⻎ (4 strokes in dictionaries) is adopted, despite the more traditional form ⻍ is still widely used in publications.

Kangxi Dict. Japanese (hyōgai kanji) Korean Trad. Chinese (TW/HK, old)	Simp. Chinese Japanese (jōyō kanji)	Trad. Chinese (TW/HK, standard)
U+8FB6 (Variation selector: U+E0100/U+E0102) U+2ECD	U+8FB6 (U+FA66) (Variation selector: U+E0101/U+E0103) U+2ECC	U+8FB6 (Variation selector: U+E0104) U+2ECE
辶	辶	辶

== Literature ==
- Fazzioli, Edoardo (1987). Chinese calligraphy : from pictograph to ideogram : the history of 214 essential Chinese/Japanese characters. calligraphy by Rebecca Hon Ko. New York: Abbeville Press. ISBN 0-89659-774-1.
- Lunde, Ken (Jan 5, 2009). "Appendix J: Japanese Character Sets" (PDF). CJKV Information Processing: Chinese, Japanese, Korean & Vietnamese Computing (Second ed.). Sebastopol, Calif.: O'Reilly Media. ISBN 978-0-596-51447-1.
