= Radical 120 =

Chinese character radical

糸
- Radical 120 (U+2F77)
- 糸 (U+7CF8) "silk"

Pronunciations
- Pinyin: mì
- Bopomofo: ㄇㄧˋ
- Gwoyeu Romatzyh: mih
- Wade–Giles: mi^{4}
- Cantonese Yale: mihk
- Jyutping: mik6
- Japanese Kana: ベキ beki ミャク myaku (on'yomi)
- Sino-Korean: 멱 myeok

Names
- Chinese name(s): (Left) 絞絲旁/绞丝旁 jiǎosīpáng (Bottom) 絞絲底/绞丝底 jiǎosīdǐ
- Japanese name(s): 糸/いと ito (Left) 糸偏/いとへん itohen
- Hangul: 가는 실 ganeun sil

Stroke order animation

Radical 120 or radical silk (糸部) meaning "silk" is one of the 29 Kangxi radicals (214 radicals in total) composed of 6 strokes.

In the Kangxi Dictionary, there are 823 characters (out of 49,030) to be found under this radical.

糸 is also the 148th indexing component in the Table of Indexing Chinese Character Components predominantly adopted by Simplified Chinese dictionaries published in mainland China, with the left component forms 纟 (simp.) and 糹 (trad.) being its associated indexing components.

== Evolution ==
Shang dynasty Oracle bone script

Shang dynasty Bronze script

Western Zhou Bronze script

Shuowen ancient script

Small seal script character

== Derived characters ==
Strokes	Characters (糸糹)	Characters (纟)
+0	糸 (=絲) 糹	纟 (=糹)
+1	糺 (=糾) 系 (also SC form of 繫 and 係 -> 人)	
+2	糼 糽 糾 糿	纠 (=糾)
+3	紀 紁 紂 紃 約 紅 紆 紇 紈 紉	纡 (=紆) 红 (=紅) 纣 (=紂) 纤 (=纖) 纥 (=紇) 约 (=約) 级 (=級) 纨 (=紈) 纩 (=纊) 纪 (=紀) 纫 (=紉) 纶 (=綸)
+4	紊 紋 紌 納 紎 紏 紐 紑 紒 紓 純 紕 紖 紗 紘 紙 級 紛 紜 紝 紞 紟 素 紡 索 紣 (=綷) 紤 紥 (=紮) 紦	紧 (=緊) 纬 (=緯) 纭 (=紜) 纮 (=紘) 纯 (=純) 纰 (=紕) 纱 (=紗) 纲 (=綱) 纳 (=納) 纴 (=紝) 纵 (=縱) 纷 (=紛) 纸 (=紙) 纹 (=紋) 纺 (=紡) 纻 (=紵) 纼 (=紖) 纽 (=紐) 纾 (=紓)
+5	紨 紩 紪 紫 紬 紭 紮 累 (also SC form of 纍) 細 紱 紲 紳 紴 紵 紶 紷 紸 紹 紺 紻 紼 紽 紾 紿 絀 絁 終 絃 (=弦 -> 弓) 組 絅 絆 絇 絈 絉 絊 絋^{JP nonstandard} (=纊) 経^{JP} (=經)	线 (=線) 绀 (=紺) 绁 (=紲) 绂 (=紱) 练 (=練) 组 (=組) 绅 (=紳) 细 (=細) 织 (=織) 终 (=終) 绉 (=縐) 绊 (=絆) 绋 (=紼) 绌 (=絀) 绍 (=紹) 绎 (=繹) 经 (=經) 绐 (=紿)
+6	絍 絎 絏 (=紲) 結 絑 絒 絓 絔 絕 絖 絗 絘 絙 絚 (=緪) 絜 絝 絞 絟 絠 絡 絢 絣 絤 (=線) 絥 給 絧 絨 絩 絪 絫 絬 絭 絮 絯 絰 統 絲 絳 絴 絵^{JP} (=繪) 絶^{JP/GB TC} (=絕)	絷 (=縶) 绑 (=綁) 绒 (=絨) 结 (=結) 绔 (=絝) 绕 (=繞) 绖 (=絰) 绗 (=絎) 绘 (=繪) 给 (=給) 绚 (=絢) 绛 (=絳) 络 (=絡) 绝 (=絕) 绞 (=絞) 统 (=統)
+7	絛 絸 (=繭) 絹 絺 絻 絼 絽 絾 絿 綀 綁 綂 (=統) 綃 綄 綅 綆 綇 綈 綉 (=繡) 綊 綋 綌 綍 綎 綏 綐 綑 (=捆 -> 手) 綒 經 綔 綕 綖 綗 綘 (=縫) 継^{JP} (=繼) 続^{JP} (=續) 綛 緐 (=繁)	绠 (=綆) 绡 (=綃) 绢 (=絹) 绣 (=繡) 绤 (=綌) 绥 (=綏) 绦 (=絛) 继 (=繼) 绨 (=綈)
+8	綜 綝 綞 綟 綠 綡 綢 綣 綤 綥 綦 綧 綨 綩 綪 綫 (=線) 綬 維 綮 綯 綰 綱 網 綳 (=繃) 綴 綵 綶 綷 綸 綹 綺 綻 綼 綽 綾 綿 緀 緁 緂 緃 緄 緅 緆 緇 緈 緉 緊 緋 緌 緍 緎 総 (=總) 緑^{JP/GB TC} (=綠) 緒 緔 緕^{JP} (=纃)	绩 (=績) 绪 (=緒) 绫 (=綾) 绬 (=緓) 续 (=續) 绮 (=綺) 绯 (=緋) 绰 (=綽) 绱 (=緔) 绲 (=緄) 绳 (=繩) 维 (=維) 绵 (=綿) 绶 (=綬) 绷 (=繃) 绸 (=綢) 绹 (=綯) 绺 (=綹) 绻 (=綣) 综 (=綜) 绽 (=綻) 绾 (=綰) 绿 (=綠) 缀 (=綴) 缁 (=緇)
+9	緓 緖 (=緒) 緗 緘 緙 線 緛 緜 (=綿) 緝 緞 緟 締 緡 (=緜 / 愍 -> 心) 緢 緣 緤 緥 (=褓 -> 衣) 緦 緧 (=鞧 -> 革) 編 緩 緪 緫 (=總 / 䍟 -> 网) 緬 緭 緮 緯 緰 緱 緲 緳 練 緵 緶 緷 緸 緹 緺 緻 緼^{HK/GB TC} (=縕) 緽 緾 (=纏) 緿 縀 縁^{JP} (=緣) 縂 縃 縄^{JP} (=繩) 縅 縆 (=絚) 縇	缂 (=緙) 缃 (=緗) 缄 (=緘) 缅 (=緬) 缆 (=纜) 缇 (=緹) 缈 (=緲) 缉 (=緝) 缊 (=縕) 缋 (=繢) 缌 (=緦) 缍 (=綞) 缎 (=緞) 缏 (=緶) 缐 (=線) 缑 (=緱) 缒 (=縋) 缓 (=緩) 缔 (=締) 缕 (=縷) 编 (=編) 缗 (=緡) 缘 (=緣)
+10	縈 縉 縊 縋 縌 縍 縎 縏 縐 縑 縒 縓 縔 縕 縖 縗 縘 (= 繫) 縙 縚 (=絛 / 韜 -> 韋) 縛 縜 縝 縞 縟 縠 縡 縢 縣 縤 縥 縦^{JP} (=縱) 縧 (=絛) 縨	缙 (=縉) 缚 (=縛) 缛 (=縟) 缜 (=縝) 缝 (=縫) 缞 (=縗) 缟 (=縞) 缠 (=纏) 缡 (=縭) 缢 (=縊) 缣 (=縑) 缤 (=繽)
+11	縩 縪 縫 縬 縭 縮 縯 縰 縱 縲 縳 縴 縵 縶 縷 縸 縹 縺 縻 縼 總 績 縿 繀 繁 繂 繃 繄 繅 繆 繇 繉 繊^{JP} (=纖) 繌 (=緵) 繍^{JP} (=繡)	缥 (=縹) 缦 (=縵) 缧 (=縲) 缨 (=纓) 缩 (=縮) 缪 (=繆) 缫 (=繅)
+12	繈 (=襁 -> 衣) 繎 繏 繐 繑 繒 繓 織 繕 繖 繗 繘 繙 (=翻 -> 羽 / 幡 -> 巾) 繚 繛 繜 繝 繞 繟 繠 繡 繢 繣 繤 (=纂) 繥 繧 繱	缬 (=纈) 缭 (=繚) 缮 (=繕) 缯 (=繒)
+13	繋^{JP} (=繫) 繦 (=繈) 繨 繩 繪 繫 繬 繭 繮 (=韁 -> 革) 繯 繰 繲 繳 繴 繵 繶 繷 繸 繹 繺	缰 (=韁) 缱 (=繾) 缲 (=繰) 缳 (=繯) 缴 (=繳)
+14	繻 繼 繽 繾 繿 纀 纁 (=曛 -> 日) 纂 纃	
+15	纄 纅 纆 纇 纈 纉 纊 纋 續 纍 纎 (=纖) 纏 纐	
+16	纑 纒 (=纏)	缵 (=纘)
+17	纓 纔 (=才 -> 手) 纕 纖	
+18	纗	
+19	纘 纙 纚 纛	
+21	纜 纝	
+23	纞	

丝 (the simplified form of 絲) falls under radical 1 (一).

== Variant forms ==
Traditional printing form of 糸 as a left component

Preferred stroke order of the left component form 糹 in regular script

Stroke order of the simplified form 纟

This radical character takes different forms in different languages and characters.

In traditional typefaces, regardless of the position of the radical character, the two turning strokes are broken into two respectively to adapt to the carving of movable type systems, and there is usually a gap between the second and the third strokes, and the middle stroke of the last three strokes is a vertical line and is written prior to the rest two strokes (middle-left-right). In actual handwriting, however, when the radical character is used as a left component, the last three strokes are more often written as dots from left to right (糹) rather than middle-left-right, especially in regular script.

Currently, when used independently or as a bottom component (as in 索, 繁, etc.), the discontinuous turning strokes are merged into one, and a hook is added to the end of the vertical line to imitate the character's handwriting form in both printed Simplified Chinese and Traditional Chinese. When used as a left component, it is simplified as 纟 in Simplified Chinese, which is derived from the cursive form of 糹. The standard printing form of the traditional left component form 糹 is also altered to imitate the handwriting form, and the last three strokes are also written left-to-right. In addition, in mainland China's Guo Biao traditional Chinese characters, the first dot in the last three strokes of 糹 tilts to the left, while in Taiwan's Standard Form of National Characters, all three dots are written rightward. The more traditional typeface form 糸 is still widely used in Traditional Chinese publication

The traditional form remains standard in modern Japanese and Korean printing typefaces, while in handwriting, both forms are acceptable.

Traditional Typefaces Japanese Korean	Simp. Chinese	Handwriting form Trad. Chinese (Mainland China)	Handwriting form Trad. Chinese (Taiwan)
糸 結	糸 结	糸 結	糸 結

== Sinogram ==
The radical is also used as an independent Chinese character. It is one of the kyōiku kanji or kanji taught in elementary school in Japan. It is a first grade kanji.

== Literature ==
- Fazzioli, Edoardo (1987). Chinese calligraphy : from pictograph to ideogram : the history of 214 essential Chinese/Japanese characters. calligraphy by Rebecca Hon Ko. New York: Abbeville Press. ISBN 0-89659-774-1.
- Lunde, Ken (Jan 5, 2009). "Appendix J: Japanese Character Sets" (PDF). CJKV Information Processing: Chinese, Japanese, Korean & Vietnamese Computing (Second ed.). Sebastopol, Calif.: O'Reilly Media. ISBN 978-0-596-51447-1.
