= Jiu zixing =

Traditional printing press form

Jiu zixing (simplified Chinese: 旧字形; traditional Chinese: 舊字形; pinyin: jiù zìxíng; Wade–Giles: chiu^{4} tzŭ^{4}hsing^{2}; Jyutping: gau6 zi6jing4; lit. 'Old character form'), also known as inherited glyph form, or traditional glyph form, not to be confused with Traditional Chinese, is a traditional orthography of Chinese characters which uses the orthodox character forms, especially the character forms used in print after the development of movable type printing, but before reformation by national standardization. Jiu zixing formed in the Ming Dynasty, and is also known as Kyūjitai in Japan.

Broadly, jiu zixing refers to all character forms used in printed Chinese before reformation by national standardization, such as xin zixing in mainland China, the Standard Form of National Characters in Taiwan, and List of Graphemes of Commonly-Used Chinese Characters in Hong Kong. Jiu zixing is generally the opposite form of the standards. Some representative books that used jiu zixing include Kangxi Dictionary, Zhongwen Da Cidian, Dai Kan-Wa Jiten, Chinese-Korean Dictionary, and Zhonghua Da Zidian.

Scholars have developed several standards for jiu zixing, but there is no single enforced standard. Variations of jiu zixing can be seen in the Kangxi Dictionary, Old Chinese printing forms, Korean Hanja, some printed documents in Taiwan, and MingLiU in Windows 98 and earlier versions; slight differences may occur between different jiu zixing standards. Some open-sourced communities also develop and maintain jiu zixing standards which are either based on or unify other jiu zixing forms from academic research.

== Origin ==
During the woodblock printing era, words were usually carved in handwritten form (regular script) as each woodblock is different, making the work to produce each printed book tedious. The development of wooden movable type during the Song dynasty caused the Chinese characters to take on a more rectangular form following the wood texture. Vertical strokes were thickened to reduce engraving loss, while a small triangle was added at the end of horizontal strokes and the start of vertical strokes to improve the legibility of text even after the pieces are worn out by long-term use. As the character styles started to differ widely from regular script, the calligraphic methods used on regular scripts could not be used on movable type characters and a new distinctive style designated for movable type was born. This style was developed fully during the Ming dynasty, which has now evolved into Ming typefaces.

Comparing movable type and woodblock styles, it can be noticed that movable type characters – which are the basis of jiu zixing today – are different from the random and changing nature of handwritten regular script, and emphasize clear strokes and the beautiful, symmetric structure of characters. Movable type characters also emphasize the philology aspects of Chinese characters more so than regular script.

== Standardizations ==
=== Kangxi Dictionary ===
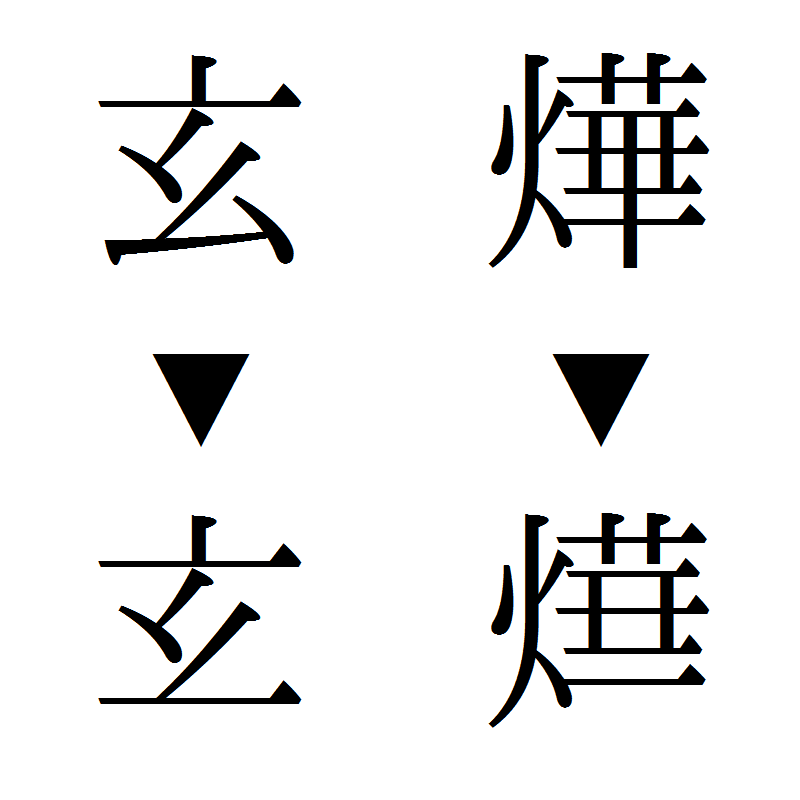
In the Kangxi Dictionary, the final strokes of taboo characters (such as 玄 and 燁) are omitted.

The Kangxi Dictionary is viewed as a standardization of jiu zixing, especially in Taiwan, and its character forms are referenced by multiple standards. The Kangxi Dictionary includes a few taboo characters differing from standard forms, such as 燁 (rendered as 𤍞) and 玄 (rendered as 𤣥).

=== Standard printing characters in Korea ===
Character forms depicted in KS X 1001 and KS X 1002 can usually be used as jiu zixing, but some fonts may not adhere to the Kangxi Dictionary. For example, the first stroke of 音 is a wilted dot (or vertical dot, 竪點,), and some components of 儿 (such as that in 微) use 几 instead.

=== Kyūjitai in Japan ===
Kyūjitai is the character form used before Japan released the JIS X 0218 standard (later expanded to JIS X 2013). In 2004, the revised version JIS X 0213:2004 changed some character forms back to Kyūjitai. Some characters have two or more forms listed.

=== Inherited Glyphs Standardisation Documents ===
The Inherited Glyphs Standardisation Documents is a modern open-source orthography standard compiled by the organization Ichitenfont, mainly defined under the 'Checklist of Inherited Glyphs document. The checklist is conducted under philological research, with care given of orthographical theory, current usage, and aesthetics in traditional orthographies. Mixed components in current standards are separated and normalized to different character forms, and the most representative inherited character form is chosen as the recommended form. The standard also includes other orthographical forms with daily usage which have a legitimate philological source, providing various options to adjust and adapt character orthography on a per-font basis. The standard and its annex are available on GitHub under CC-BY 4.0, along with a supplementary font "I.Ming" which is used as the representative glyphs of the orthography standard, licensed under IPA Font License. There are other open-source and commercial fonts providing support for Inherited Glyphs Standardisation Documents standard.

=== Orthographies used by modern digital fonts ===
Most modern font foundries, including justfont and Arphic, provide Chinese fonts using a current-generation style, which generally follows jiu zixing forms and styles, with some strokes or characters changed to follow current education forms. These fonts are partly xin zixing and do not fully follow the character forms of jiu zixing or that of the Kangxi Dictionary. IBM Plex Sans TC, an open-source Traditional Chinese font released in August 2024, uses an "amalgam" style which is similar to the current-generation style.

Some jiu zixing digital fonts were changed to use xin zixing forms. Two notable examples of such fonts are the default Traditional Chinese system fonts offered on earlier versions of Windows and macOS, which are MingLiU and Heiti TC respectively. Opponents of the jiu zixing form reported the fonts as "incorrect", leading to a change to xin zixing forms in later versions.

== See also ==
- Xin zixing
- Ming/Song typeface
- Traditional Chinese characters
