= Radical 119 =

Chinese character radical

米
- Radical 119 (U+2F76)
- 米 (U+7C73) "rice"

Pronunciations
- Pinyin: mǐ
- Bopomofo: ㄇㄧˇ
- Gwoyeu Romatzyh: mii
- Wade–Giles: mi^{3}
- Cantonese Yale: máih
- Jyutping: mai5
- Japanese Kana: ベイ bei / マイ mai (on'yomi) こめ kome (kun'yomi)
- Sino-Korean: 미 mi

Names
- Chinese name(s): (Left) 米字旁 mǐzìpáng (Bottom) 米字底 mǐzìdǐ
- Japanese name(s): 米/こめ kome (Left) 米偏/こめへん komehen
- Hangul: 쌀 ssal

Stroke order animation

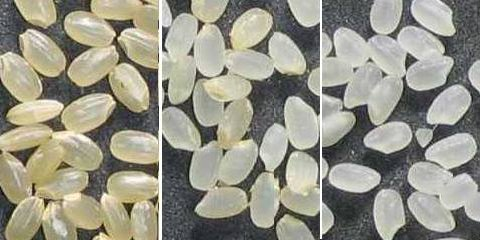
Rice

Radical 119 or radical rice (米部) meaning "rice" is one of the 29 Kangxi radicals (214 radicals in total) composed of 6 strokes.

In the Kangxi Dictionary, there are 318 characters (out of 49,030) to be found under this radical.

米 is also the 144th indexing component in the Table of Indexing Chinese Character Components predominantly adopted by Simplified Chinese dictionaries published in mainland China.

== Evolution ==
Unrelated to 木, 禾, and 来.

Shang dynasty Oracle bone script

Western Zhou Bronze script

Chu slip and silk script

Qin slip script

Large seal script character

Small seal script character

== Derived characters ==
Strokes	Characters
+0	米
+2	籴^{SC} (=糴) 籵 (=蹯 -> 足) 籶
+3	娄^{SC} (=婁) 籷 籸 籹 籺 类^{SC} (=類) 籼^{SC} (=秈) 籽 籾 籿 粀 粁 粂
+4	粃 (=秕 -> 禾 / 紕 -> 糸) 粄 粅 粆 粇 (=糠/粳) 粈 粉 粊 粋^{JP} (=粹) 粌 粍 粎 粏 粐 粑
+5	畨 (=翻 -> 羽 / 番 -> 田) 粒 粓 粔 粕 粖 粗 粘 粙 粚 粛^{JP} (=肅 -> 聿) 粜^{SC} (=糶) 粝^{SC} (=糲) 粣
+6	粞 粟 粠 粡 粢 粤^{SC/JP} (=粵) 粥 粦 粧 (=妝 -> 女) 粨 粩 粪^{SC} (=糞) 粫 粬 (=麴 -> 麥) 粭
+7	粮^{SC} (=糧) 粯 粰 粱 粲 粳 粴 粵 糀
+8	粶 粷 粸 粹 粺 (=稗 -> 禾) 粻 粼 粽 精 粿 糁^{SC} (=糝)
+9	糂 (=糝) 糃 糄 糅 糆 糇^{SC} (=餱) 糈 糉 (=粽) 糊 糋 糌 糍 糎
+10	糏 糐 糑 糒 糓 糔 糕 糖 糗 糘
+11	糙 糚 糛 (=糖) 糜 糝 糞 糟 糠 糡 糢 糨
+12	糣 糤 (=饊 -> 食) 糥 糦 糧
+13	糩 糪 糫 糬 糭 (=粽)
+14	糮 糯 糰
+15	糲
+16	糱 糳 糴
+17	糵 (=糱)
+19	糶
+21	糷

== Variant forms ==
This radical character has a different form in Taiwan Traditional Chinese to forms in the other writing systems.

Traditionally, the two diagonal strokes under the horizontal start from the central junction, and the last stroke is a right-falling press when the character appears independently, or a dot when used as a component. In Taiwan's Standard Form of National Characters, however, all four diagonal strokes are detached from other strokes, and the last stroke is replaced for a dot, whether used independently or as a component.

Traditional	Taiwan
米 粒	米 粒

== Sinogram ==
The radical is also used as an independent Chinese character. It is one of the kyōiku kanji or kanji taught in elementary schools in Japan. It is a second grade kanji.

== Literature ==
- Fazzioli, Edoardo (1987). Chinese calligraphy : from pictograph to ideogram : the history of 214 essential Chinese/Japanese characters. calligraphy by Rebecca Hon Ko. New York: Abbeville Press. ISBN 0-89659-774-1.
- Lunde, Ken (Jan 5, 2009). "Appendix J: Japanese Character Sets" (PDF). CJKV Information Processing: Chinese, Japanese, Korean & Vietnamese Computing (Second ed.). Sebastopol, Calif.: O'Reilly Media. ISBN 978-0-596-51447-1.
