= Radical 184 =

Chinese character radical

食
- Radical 184 (U+2FB7)
- 食 (U+98DF) "eat, food"

Pronunciations
- Pinyin: shí
- Bopomofo: ㄕˊ
- Wade–Giles: shi2
- Cantonese Yale: sik6
- Jyutping: sik6
- Japanese Kana: ショク shoku (on'yomi) く-う ku-u / た-べる ta-beru (kun'yomi)
- Sino-Korean: 식 sik
- Hán-Việt: thực, tự

Names
- Chinese name(s): (Left) 食字旁 shízìpáng (Bottom) 食字底 shízì
- Japanese name(s): 食/しょく shoku (Left) 食偏/しょくへん shokuhen
- Hangul: 밥 bap

Stroke order animation

Stroke order of the left component form 飠

Stroke order of the simplified left component form 饣

Radical 184 or radical eat (食部) meaning "eat" or "food" is one of the 11 Kangxi radicals (214 radicals in total) composed of 9 strokes.

In the Kangxi Dictionary, there are 403 characters (out of 49,030) to be found under this radical.

食 is also the 185th indexing component in the Table of Indexing Chinese Character Components predominantly adopted by Simplified Chinese dictionaries published in mainland China, with the simplified left component form 饣 and its traditional form 飠 listed as its associated indexing components.

== Evolution ==
Ideogrammic compound 亼 ("mouth") + 皀 ("a bowl of rice on a stand"); unrelated to 良.

Shang dynasty Oracle bone script

Western Zhou Bronze script

Spring and Autumn period bronze script

Warring States period bronze script

Chu slip and silk script

Qin slip script

Large seal script

Small seal script

=== 皀 ===
Rice bowl part of 食.

Shang dynasty Oracle bone script

Western Zhou Bronze script

Large seal script

Small seal script

== Derived characters ==
Strokes	Characters (食飠)	Characters (饣)
+0	食 飠^{Component}	饣^{SC component} (=飠)
+2	飡 (=餐) 飢 飣 飤 (=飼)	饤^{SC} (=飣) 饥^{SC} (=飢)
+3	飥 飦 飧 飨^{SC} (=饗)	饦^{SC} (=飥) 饧^{SC} (=餳)
+4	飩 飪 飫 飬 飭 飮 (=飲) 飯 飰 (=飯) 飱 (=飧) 飲	饨^{SC} (=飩) 饩^{SC} (=餼) 饪^{SC} (=飪) 饫^{SC} (=飫) 饬^{SC} (=飭) 饭^{SC} (=飯) 饮^{SC} (=飲)
+5	飳 飴 飵 飶 飷 飸 (=饕) 飹 飻 飼 飽 飾 飿	饯^{SC} (=餞) 饰^{SC} (=飾) 饱^{SC} (=飽) 饲^{SC} (=飼) 饳^{SC} (=飿) 饴^{SC} (=飴)
+6	飺 餀 餁 (=飪) 餂 餃 餄 餅 餆 餇 餈 (=糍 -> 米) 餉 養 餋 餌 餍^{SC} (=饜) 餎 餏	饵^{SC} (=餌) 饶^{SC} (=饒) 饷^{SC} (=餉) 饸^{SC} (=餄) 饹^{SC} (=餎) 饺^{SC} (=餃) 饻^{SC} (=餏) 饼^{SC} (=餅)
+7	餐 餑 餒 餓 餔 餕 餖 餗 餘 餙 餝	饽^{SC} (=餑) 饾^{SC} (=餖) 饿^{SC} (=餓) 馀^{SC} (=餘) 馁^{SC} (=餒) 馂^{SC} (=餕)
+8	餚 餛 餜 餞 餟 餠 (=餅) 餡 餢 餣 餤 餥 餦 餧 (=餵) 館 餩	馃^{SC} (=餜) 馄^{SC} (=餛) 馅^{SC} (=餡) 馆^{SC} (=館)
+9	餪 餫 餬 (=糊 -> 米) 餭 餮 餯 餰 餱 餲 餳 餴 餵 餷	馇^{SC} (=餷) 馈^{SC} (=饋) 馊^{SC} (=餿) 馋^{SC} (=饞)
+10	餶 餸 餹 (=糖 -> 米) 餺 餻 (=糕 -> 米) 餼 餽 餾 餿 饀 饁 饂 饃	馉^{SC} (=餶) 馌^{SC} (=饁) 馍^{SC} (=饃) 馎^{SC} (=餺) 馏^{SC} (=餾) 馐^{SC} (=饈)
+11	饄 (=糖 -> 米) 饅 饆 饇 饈 饉	馑^{SC} (=饉) 馒^{SC} (=饅)
+12	饊 饋 饌 饍 (=膳 -> 肉) 饎 饏 饐 饑 饒 饓	馓^{SC} (=饊) 馔^{SC} (=饌)
+13	饔 饕 饖 饗 饘 饙	
+14	饚 饛 饜	
+16	饝 (=饃)	
+17	饞 饟 (=餉)	
+19	饠 饡	
+22	饢	馕^{SC} (=饢)

== Variant forms ==
This radical character has different forms in different languages when used as an individual character and as a component.

Traditionally, when used as an individual character, its third stroke is printed as either a horizontal line (食) or a vertical line (食), but more often written as a slanted dot (食); when used as a left component, it is usually printed as 𩙿 and written as 飠 in regular script.

In China, xin zixing adopted the handwritten form 食 and 飠 and applies it also to printing typefaces. This change is applied chiefly to Traditional Chinese publications in mainland China; the left component form 飠 was already replaced by the simplified form 饣 prior to the printing typeface reform. Taiwan's Standard Form of National Characters and Hong Kong's List of Graphemes of Commonly-Used Chinese Characters use 食 and 飠 (the third stroke is horizontal) as the standard forms, while other alternative forms (e.g. 食/𩙿, 食/飠) are still rather prevalent in publishing.

In modern Japanese, 食 (third stroke is horizontal) and 𩙿 are seen as the traditional/orthodox forms. The shinjitai reform changed the third stroke in 食 as an individual character or as a non-left component to a short horizontal line (食); changed the left component form 𩙿 to 飠. In principle, these changes apply only to jōyō kanji (more specifically, jōyō kanji before 2010 revision; some characters added in 2010 were not simplified); the traditional form is used for hyōgai kanji.

Kangxi Dict. Korean	Japanese	Trad. Chinese (TW, HK, MO)	Trad. Chinese (Mainland China)	Simp. Chinese
食	食	食	食	食
飼	飼	飼	飼	饲
饉	饉	饉	饉	馑
饕	饕	饕	饕	饕

== Literature ==
- Fazzioli, Edoardo (1987). Chinese calligraphy : from pictograph to ideogram : the history of 214 essential Chinese/Japanese characters. calligraphy by Rebecca Hon Ko. New York: Abbeville Press. ISBN 0-89659-774-1.
