= Radical 85 =

Chinese character radical

水
- Radical +85 (U+2F54)
- 水 (U+6C34) "water"

Pronunciations
- Pinyin: shuǐ
- Bopomofo: ㄕㄨㄟˇ
- Gwoyeu Romatzyh: shoei
- Wade–Giles: shui^{3}
- Cantonese Yale: séui
- Jyutping: seoi2
- Pe̍h-ōe-jī: súi
- Japanese Kana: スイ sui (on'yomi) みず mizu (kun'yomi)
- Sino-Korean: 수 su

Names
- Chinese name(s): (氵) 三點水/三点水 sāndiǎnshuǐ
- Japanese name(s): 水/みず mizu (氵) 三水/さんずい sanzui (Bottom) 下水/したみず shitamizu
- Hangul: 물 mul (氵) 삼수변/三水邊 samsubyeon

Stroke order animation

Radical 85 or radical water (水部) meaning "water" is a Kangxi radical; one of 35 of the 214 that are composed of 4 strokes. Its left-hand form, 氵, is closely related to Radical 15, 冫 bīng (also known as 两点水 liǎngdiǎnshuǐ), meaning "ice", from which it differs by the addition of just one stroke.

In the Kangxi Dictionary, there are 1,595 characters (out of 40,000) to be found under this radical.

水 is also the 77th indexing component in the Table of Indexing Chinese Character Components predominantly adopted by Simplified Chinese dictionaries published in mainland China, with 氵 and 氺 being its associated indexing component.

In the Chinese wuxing ("Five Phases"), 水 represents the element Water. In Taoist cosmology, 水 (Water) is the nature component of the bagua diagram 坎 kǎn.

== Evolution ==
=== 水 ===
Compare 巛.

Oracle bone script

Bronze script

Warring States period bronze script

Chu slip and silk script

Qin slip script

Large seal script

Small seal script

=== 永 ===
Oracle bone script

Bronze script

Large seal script

Small seal script

=== 求 ===
A centipede.

Oracle bone script

Bronze script

Large seal script

Small seal script

== Derived characters ==
Strokes	Characters
+0	水 氵 氺 (= 水)
+1	氶 氷 (= 冰 -> 冫) 永 氹
+2	氽 氻 氼 (= 溺) 氾 氿 汀 汁 求 汃 汄 (= 㳁) 汅 (= 沔) 汆 汇^{SC} (= 匯 -> 匚) 汈 汉^{SC} (= 漢)
+3	汊 汋 汌 汍 汎 汏 汐 汑 汒 (=茫 -> 艸) 汓 (=泅) 汔 汕 汖 (=流 / 池 / 𣎵 -> 木) 汗 汘 汙 (=污) 汚^{JP} (=污) 汛 汜 汝 汞 江 池 污 汢 汣 汤^{SC} (=湯)
+4	汥 汦 汧 汨 汩 汪 汫 汬 (=阱 -> 阜) 汭 汮 汯 汰 汱 汲 汳 汴 汵 汶 汷 汸 汹^{SC} (=洶) 決 汻 汼 汽 汾 汿 沀 (=汿) 沁 沂 沃 沄 (also SC form of 澐) 沅 沆 沇 沈 (also SC form of 瀋) 沉 沊 沋 沌 沍 沎 沏 沐 沑 沒 沓 沔 沕 沖 沗 (=添) 沘 沙 沚 沛 沜 沝 沞 沟^{SC} (=溝) 沠 没^{SC/JP} (=沒) 沢^{JP} (=澤) 沣^{SC} (=灃) 沤^{SC} (=漚) 沥^{SC} (=瀝) 沦^{SC} (=淪) 沧^{SC} (=滄) 沨^{SC} (=渢) 沩^{SC} (=溈) 沪 (SC form of 滬 / JP form of 濾)
+5	沫 沬 沭 沮 沯 沰 沱 沲 河 沴 沵 (=濔/沴) 沶 沷 沸 油 沺 治 沼 沽 沾 沿 泀 況 泂 泃 泄^{SC} (=洩) 泅 泆 泇 泈 泉 泊 泋 泌 泍 泎 泏 泐 泑 泒 泓 泔 法 泖 泗 泘 泙 泛 泜 泝 (=溯) 泞^{SC} (=濘) 泟 (=浾) 泠 泡 波 泣 泤 (=汜) 泥 泦 泧 注 泩 泪^{SC} (=淚) 泫 泬 泭 (=桴 -> 木) 泮 泯 泰 泱 泲 泳 泴 泶 (=澩) 泷^{SC} (=瀧) 泸^{SC} (=瀘) 泹 泺^{SC} (=濼) 泻^{SC} (=瀉) 泼^{SC} (=潑) 泽^{SC} (=澤) 泾^{SC} (=涇) 浅^{SC} (=淺)
+6	泚 泿 洀 洁^{SC} (=潔) 洂 洃 洄 洅 洆 洇 洈 洉 洊 洋 洌 洎 洏 洐 洑 洒^{SC} (=灑) 洓 洔 洕 洗 洘 洙 洚 洛 洜 (=洛) 洝 洞 洟 洠 (=涘) 洡 洢 洣 洤 津 洦 洧 洨 洩 洪 洫 洬 洭 洮 洯 洰 洱 洲 洳 洴 洵 洶 洷 洸 洹 洺 活 洼^{SC} (=窪 -> 穴) 洽 派 洿 浀 流 浂 浃^{SC} (=浹) 浄^{JP} (=淨) 浅^{JP} (=淺) 浆^{SC} (=漿) 浇^{SC} (=澆) 浈^{SC} (=湞) 浉^{SC} (=溮) 浊^{SC} (=濁) 测^{SC} (=測) 浌 浍^{SC} (=澮) 济^{SC} (=濟) 浏^{SC} (=瀏) 浐^{SC} (=滻) 浑^{SC} (=渾) 浒^{SC} (=滸) 浓^{SC} (=濃) 浔^{SC} (=潯) 浕^{SC} (=濜)
+7	酒 洍 (=汜) 洖 浖 浗 浘 浙 浚 浛 浜 (also JP form of 濱) 浝 浞 浟 浠 浡 浢 浣 浤 浥 浦 浧 浨 浩 浪 浫 浬 浭 浮 浯 浰 浱 (=漘) 浲 浳 浴 浵 浶 海 浸 浹 浺 浻 浼 浽 浾 浿 涀 涁 (=滲) 涂 (also SC form of 塗 -> 土) 涃 涄 涅 涆 涇 消 涉 涊 涋 涌 (also SC form of 湧) 涍 涎 涏 涐 涑 涒 涓 涔 涕 涖 涗 涘 涚^{SC/HK} (=涗) 涛^{SC/JP} (=濤) 涜^{JP} (=瀆) 涝^{SC} (=澇) 涞^{SC} (=淶) 涟^{SC} (=漣) 涠^{SC} (=潿) 涡^{SC} (=渦) 涢^{SC} (=溳) 涣^{SC} (=渙) 涤^{SC} (=滌) 涥 润^{SC} (=潤) 涧^{SC} (=澗) 涨^{SC} (=漲) 涩^{SC} (=澀)
+8	涙^{JP} (=淚) 涪 涫 涬 涭 涮 涯 涰 (=啜 -> 口) 涱 液 涳 涴 涵 涶 涷 涸 涹 涺 涻 涼 涽 涾 涿 淀^{SC} (=澱) 淁 淂 淃 淄 淅 淆 淇 淈 淉 淊 (=淹) 淋 淌 淍 淎 淏 淐 淑 淒 淓 淔 淕 淖 淗 (=泦) 淘 淙 淚 淛 (=浙) 淜 淝 淞 淟 淠 淡 淢 淣 淤 淥 淦 淧 (=㴵) 淨 淩 淪 淫 淬 淭 淮 淯 淰 深 淲 淳 淴 淵 淶 混 淸 (=清) 淹 淺 添 淼 (=渺) 淽 淾 (=飲 -> 食) 淿 (=泊) 渀 渁 (=淵) 渂 (=汶 / 岷 -> 山) 渄 清 渆 (=淵) 渇^{JP} (=渴) 済^{JP} (=濟) 渉^{JP} (=涉) 渊^{SC} (=淵) 渋^{JP} (=澀) 渌^{SC} (=淥) 渍^{SC} (=漬) 渎^{SC} (=瀆) 渏 (=漪) 渐^{SC} (=漸) 渑^{SC} (=澠) 渒 渓^{JP} (=溪) 渔^{SC} (=漁) 渕 (=淵) 渖^{SC nonstandard} (=瀋) 渗^{SC} (=滲) 渚 湴
+9	渃 渘 渙 減 渜 渝 渞 渟 渠 渡 渢 渣 渤 渥 渦 渧 渨 温^{SC/HK/JP} (=溫) 渪 (=濡) 渫 測 渭 渮 (=菏 -> 艸) 港 渰 渱 渲 渳 渴 渵 渶 渷 (=沇) 游 渹 渺 渻 渼 渽 渾 渿 湀 湁 湂 湃 湄 湅 湆 湇 (=湆) 湈 湉 湊 湋 湌 (=餐 -> 食) 湍 湎 湏 湐 (=洦) 湑 湒 湓 湔 湕 湖 湗 湘 湙 湚 湛 湜 湝 湞 湟 湠 湡 湢 湣 湤 湥 湦 湧 湨 湩 湪 湫 湬 (=湫) 湭 湮 湯 湰 湱 湲 湳 湵 湶 湷 湸 湹 (=瀍) 湺 (=涎) 湻 (=淳) 湼 (=涅) 湽 (=淄) 湾^{SC}/湾^{SC} (=灣) 湿^{SC/JP} (=濕) 満^{JP} (=滿) 溁^{SC} (=濚) 溂 溃^{SC} (=潰) 溄 (=漨) 溅^{SC} (=濺) 溆 (=漵) 溇^{SC} (=漊) 溈 溉 溊 (=波) 溋 (=盈 -> 皿) 溌^{JP} (=潑) 滋 滞^{SC} (=滯)
+10	滞^{JP} (=滯) 溍 溎 溏 源 溑 溒 溓 溔 溕 (=濛) 準 溗 溘 溙 溚 溛 溜 溝 溞 溟 溠 溡 溢 溣 溤 溥 溦 溧 溨 (=渽) 溩 溪 溫 溬 (=㳾) 溭 溮 溯 溰 溱 溲 溳 溴 溵 溶 溷 溸 溹 溺 溻 溼 (=濕) 溽 溾 溿 滀 滁 滂 滃 滄 滅 滆 滇 滈 滉 滊 滍 滎 滏 滐 滑 滒 滓 滔 滕 滖 滗^{SC} (=潷) 滘 滙 (=匯 -> 匚) 滛 (=淫) 滜 滝^{JP} (=瀧) 滟^{SC} (=灩) 滠^{SC} (=灄) 满^{SC} (=滿) 滢^{SC} (=瀅) 滣 (=漘) 滤^{SC} (=濾) 滥^{SC} (=濫) 滦^{SC} (=灤) 滧 滨^{SC} (=濱) 滩^{SC} (=灘) 滪^{SC} (=澦) 漓 (also SC forom of 灕)
+11	滌 滚^{SC} (=滾) 滫 滬 滭 滮 滯 滰 滱 滲 滳 滴 滵 滶 滷 滸 滹 滺 (=浟) 滻 滼 滽 滾 滿 漀 漁 漂 漃 漄 (=涯) 漅 漆 漇 漈 漉 漊 漌 漍 漎 漏 漐 漑 (=溉) 漒 演 漕 漖 漗 漘 漙 漚 漛 漜 漝 漞 漟 漠 漡 (=湯) 漢 漣 漤 漥 漦 漧 (=乾 -> 乙) 漨 漩 漪 漫 漬 漭 漮 漯 漰 漱 漲 漳 漴 漵 漶 漷 漸 漹 漺 漻 漼 漾 漿 潀 潁 潂 (=洪) 潃 (=滫) 潄 (=漱) 潅 (=灌) 潆^{SC} (=瀠) 潇^{SC} (=瀟) 潈 潉 潊 (=漵) 潋^{SC} (=瀲) 潌 潍^{SC} (=濰)
+12	漋 漽 潎 潏 潐 潑 潒 潓 潔 潕 潖 潗 潘 潙 潚 潛 潜^{SC/JP} (=潛) 潝 潞 潟 潠 潡 潢 潣 潤 潥 潦 潧 (=溱) 潨 潩 潪 潫 潬 潭 潮 潯 潰 潱 潲 潳 潴^{SC} (=瀦) 潵 潶 潷 潸 潹 (=潺) 潺 潻 潼 潽 潾 潿 澁 (=澀) 澂 (=澄) 澃 澄 澅 澆 澇 澈 澉 澊 澋 澌 澍 澎 澏 (=浛) 澐 澑 (=溜) 澒 澓 澔 澕 澖 澗 澘 (=潸) 澚 澛^{SC} (=瀂) 澜^{SC} (=瀾) 澝 (=濘) 濐 (=渚)
+13	澙 (=潟) 澞 澟 (=凜 -> 冫) 澠 澡 澢 澣 (=浣) 澤 澥 澦 澧 澨 澩 澪 澫 澬 澭 澮 澯 澰 澱 澲 澳 澴 澵 澶 澷 澸 澹 澺 澻 澼 澽 澾 澿 激 濁 濂 濃 濄 濅 (=浸) 濆 濇 濈 濉 濊 濋 濌 濍 濎 濏 濑^{SC} (=瀨) 濒^{SC} (=瀕) 濓 濖
+14	澀 濔 濕 濗 濘 濙 濚 濛 濜 濝 濞 濟 濠 濡 濢 濣 濤 濥 濦 濧 濨 濩 濪 濫 濬 (=浚) 濭 濮 濯 濰 濱 濲 濴 濵 (=濱) 濶 (=闊 -> 門) 濷 濸
+15	濹 濺 濻 (=瀢) 濼 濽 (=灒) 濾 濿 瀀 瀁 瀂 瀃 瀄 瀅 瀆 瀇 瀈 瀉 瀊 瀋 瀌 瀍 瀎 瀏 瀐 (=瀸) 瀑 瀒 (=澀) 瀓 (=澄) 瀔
+16	濳 (=潛) 瀕 瀖 瀗 瀘 瀙 瀚 瀛 瀜 瀝 瀞 瀟 瀠 瀡 瀢 瀣 瀤 瀥 (=滈) 瀦 瀧 瀨 瀩 瀪 瀫 瀬^{JP} (=瀨) 瀭 瀮
+17	瀯 瀰 瀱 瀲 瀳 瀴 瀵 瀶 瀷 瀸 瀹 瀺 瀻 瀼 瀽 瀾 瀿 灀 灁 (=淵)
+18	灂 灃 灄 灅 灆 灇 灈 灉 灊 灋 (=法) 灌 灍 (=㵐) 灏^{SC} (=灝) 灐 (=瀅)
+19	灑 灒 灓 灔 (=灩) 灕 灖 灗 灘
+20	灙 灚 灛 灜 (=瀛)
+21	灝 灞 灟 灠 (=漤) 灡
+22	灢 灣
+23	灎 (=灩) 灤 灥 灦
+24	灧 (=灩) 灨 (=贛 -> 貝)
+28	灩
+29	灪

== Sinogram ==
The radical is also used as an independent Chinese character. It is one of the kyōiku kanji or kanji taught in elementary school in Japan. It is a first grade kanji.

== Literature ==
- Fazzioli, Edoardo (1987). Chinese calligraphy : from pictograph to ideogram : the history of 214 essential Chinese/Japanese characters. calligraphy by Rebecca Hon Ko. New York: Abbeville Press. ISBN 0-89659-774-1.
- Leyi Li: “Tracing the Roots of Chinese Characters: 500 Cases”. Beijing 1993, ISBN 978-7-5859-0204-2 tai
