= Chart of Standard Forms of Common National Characters =

Taiwanese list of Chinese characters

The Chart of Standard Forms of Common National Characters or the Table of Standard Typefaces for Frequently-Used Chinese Characters (Chinese: 常用國字標準字體表; pinyin: Chángyòng Guózì Biāozhǔn Zìtǐ Biǎo) is a list of 4,808 commonly used Chinese characters. The standard typefaces were prescribed by Taiwan's Ministry of Education, and have been adopted in the textbooks for primary and junior high schools in Taiwan since September 1982.

== History ==
The project to standardize frequently used Chinese characters started in 1973. This work was undertaken by a task force consisting from the Graduate Institute of Chinese of the National Taiwan Normal University. The Chart was completed in 1978 and published in June 1979.

On September 1, 1982, the Ministry of Education promulgated the Chart of Standard Forms of Common National Characters, which contained 4,808 characters. In December of the same year, it publicized the Chart of Standard Forms of Less-Than-Common National Characters (Chinese: 次常用國字標準字體表; pinyin: Cì Chángyòng Guózì Biāozhǔn Zìtǐ Biǎo), which included 6,341 characters.

In addition, 18,388 characters in the Chart of Rarely-Used National Characters (Chinese: 罕用國字標準字體表; pinyin: Hǎnyòng Guózì Biāozhǔn Zìtǐ Biǎo) and 18,588 characters in the Chart of Variant Characters (Chinese: 異體國字字表; pinyin: Yìtǐ Guózì Zìbiǎo) were established later. These four charts include a total of 48,125 characters.

On August 4, 1986, Chinese Standard Interchange Code (CNS 11643) was announced as a national standard. Its character encoding plane order is set based on the frequency of usage. The characters set and typeface of CNS 11643 were established on the basis of the Chart of Standard Forms of Common National Characters.

In the Taiwan Ministry of Education's Dictionary of Chinese Variant Form (Chinese: 異體字字典; pinyin: yìtǐzì zìdiǎn) Digital Edition, the Common National Characters are coded as A. The Less-Than-Common Characters are designated to B and changed to 6,329 characters. The Rarely-Used Characters are C, and the number reduce to 18,318 characters. Also, 465 new-added standard characters are labeled as N. In total, there are 29,921 standard characters in this dictionary, others are deemed as variant characters. The number of variant characters in the latest Dictionary of Chinese Variant Form Digital Edition is 74,407.

== See also ==
- Standard Form of National Characters
