= Radical 15 =

Chinese character radical

冫
- Radical 15 (U+2F0E)
- 冫 (U+51AB) "ice"

Pronunciations
- Pinyin: bīng
- Bopomofo: ㄅ一ㄥ
- Wade–Giles: ping1
- Cantonese Yale: bing1
- Jyutping: bing1
- Pe̍h-ōe-jī: peng
- Japanese Kana: ヒョウ hyō (on'yomi) こおり kōri (kun'yomi)
- Sino-Korean: 빙 bing
- Hán-Việt: băng

Names
- Chinese name(s): 兩點水/两点水 liǎngdiǎnshuǐ
- Japanese name(s): 二水/にすい nisui
- Hangul: 얼음 eoreum

Stroke order animation

Radical 15 or radical ice (冫部), meaning ice, is one of 23 of the 214 Kangxi radicals that are composed of 2 strokes.

In the Kangxi Dictionary, there are 115 characters (out of 49,030) to be found under this radical.

冫 is also the 18th indexing component in the Table of Indexing Chinese Character Components predominantly adopted by Simplified Chinese dictionaries published in mainland China.

== Evolution ==
=== 冫/仌 ===
Unrelated to 氵 and 次 .

Shang dynasty oracle bone script

Bronze script

Large seal script

Small seal script

Note that in modern Traditional Chinese, Simplified Chinese and Japanese, radical ice in somes (e.g. 冬, 寒) is now written as two dots. Their original forms are retained in Korean hanja and some old Traditional Chinese typefaces (e.g. 冬, 寒).

=== 冬 (winter) ===
Shang dynasty oracle bone script

Shang dynasty bronze script

Warring States period bronze script

Chu slip and silk script

Qin slip script

Large seal script

Small seal script

Han dynasty Clerical script

=== 寒 (cold) ===
宀 ("house") + 人 ("person") + 茻 ("grass"). In some bronze inscriptions, 二 is added at the bottom of the character. 二 became 仌 in seal script.

Bronze script

Large seal script

Small seal script

== Derived characters ==
Strokes	Characters
+0	冫
+3	冬 冭 冮 冯^{SC} (=馮 -> 馬)
+4	冰 (ice) 冱 冲^{SC/variant} (沖 -> 水 / 衝 -> 行) 决^{SC/variant} (=決 -> 水) 冴
+5	况^{SC/variant} (=況 -> 水, condition) 冶 冷 冸 冹 冺
+6	冻^{SC} (=凍, to freeze) 冼 冽 冾 冿 净^{SC} (=淨 -> 水, clean)
+7	凁 凂 凃
+8	凄 凅 准 凇 凈 (=淨 -> 水) 凉^{SC/variant} (=涼 -> 水, cool) 凊 凋 凌 凍 凎
+9	减^{SC/variant} (=減 -> 水, reduce) 凐 凑^{SC/variant} (=湊 -> 水, gather)
+10	凒 凓 凔 凕 凖 (=準 -> 水)
+11	凗
+12	凘
+13	凙 凚 凛^{SC/JP variant} 凜^{TC variant}
+14	凝 凞
+15	凟

In both Unihan database and mainland China's standard, the Simplified Chinese character 习 (=習) falls under radical second (Unihan: 乙部, China: 乛部 or its variant form 𠃌) instead of radical ice.

== Literature ==
- Fazzioli, Edoardo (1987). Chinese calligraphy : from pictograph to ideogram : the history of 214 essential Chinese/Japanese characters. calligraphy by Rebecca Hon Ko. New York: Abbeville Press. ISBN 0-89659-774-1.
- Leyi Li: “Tracing the Roots of Chinese Characters: 500 Cases”. Beijing 1993, ISBN 978-7-5619-0204-2
- KangXi: page 131, character 15
- Dai Kanwa Jiten: character 1607
- Dae Jaweon: page 294, character 11
- Hanyu Da Zidian: volume 1, page 295, character 1
