= Radical 178 =

Chinese character radical

韋
- Radical 178 (U+2FB1)
- 韋 (U+97CB) "tanned leather"

Pronunciations
- Pinyin: wéi
- Bopomofo: ㄨㄟˊ
- Wade–Giles: wei2
- Cantonese Yale: wai4
- Jyutping: wai4, wai5
- Japanese Kana: イ i (on'yomi) なめしがわ nameshigawa (kun'yomi)
- Sino-Korean: 위 wi
- Hán-Việt: vi, vy

Names
- Chinese name(s): 韋字旁/韦字旁 wéizìpáng
- Japanese name(s): なめしがわ nameshigawa
- Hangul: 다룸가죽 darumgajuk

Stroke order animation

Stroke order of the simplified form 韦

Radical 178 or radical tanned leather (韋部) meaning "tanner leather" is one of the 11 Kangxi radicals (214 radicals in total) composed of 9 strokes.

In the Kangxi Dictionary, there are 100 characters (out of 49,030) to be found under this radical.

韦, the simplified form of 韋, is the 63rd indexing component in the Table of Indexing Chinese Character Components predominantly adopted by Simplified Chinese dictionaries published in mainland China, while the traditional form 韋 is listed as its associated indexing component.

== Evolution ==
Compound of 舛 (feet) + 囗 (enclosure).

Oracle bone script character

Shang dynasty Bronze script character

Western Zhou Bronze script

Chu slip and silk script

Qin slip script

Large seal script character

Small seal script character

Clerical script

== Derived characters ==
Strokes	Characters (韋)	Characters (韦)
+0	韋	韦^{SC} (=韋)
+3	韌	韧^{SC} (=韌)
+5	韍 韎	韨^{SC} (=韍)
+6	韏 韐 韑	
+7	韒 (=鞘 -> 革)	
+8	韓 韔 韕	韩^{SC} (=韓)
+9	韖 韗 韘 韙 韚	韪^{SC} (=韙) 韫^{SC} (=韞)
+10	韜 韝 韞 韟	韬^{SC} (=韜)
+11	韛 韠	
+12	韡 韢	
+13	韣	
+15	韤 (=襪 -> 衣) 韥	

== Literature ==
- Fazzioli, Edoardo (1987). Chinese calligraphy : from pictograph to ideogram : the history of 214 essential Chinese/Japanese characters. calligraphy by Rebecca Hon Ko. New York: Abbeville Press. ISBN 0-89659-774-1.
- Lunde, Ken (Jan 5, 2009). "Appendix J: Japanese Character Sets" (PDF). CJKV Information Processing: Chinese, Japanese, Korean & Vietnamese Computing (Second ed.). Sebastopol, Calif.: O'Reilly Media. ISBN 978-0-596-51447-1.
