= Radical 50 =

Chinese character radical

巾
- Radical 50 (U+2F31)
- 巾 (U+5DFE) "turban, scarf"

Pronunciations
- Pinyin: jīn
- Bopomofo: ㄐㄧㄣ
- Gwoyeu Romatzyh: jin
- Wade–Giles: chin^{1}
- Cantonese Yale: gān
- Jyutping: gan1
- Pe̍h-ōe-jī: kun
- Japanese Kana: キン kin きれ kire (kun'yomi)
- Sino-Korean: 건 geon

Names
- Chinese name(s): (Left/right) 巾字旁 jīnzìpáng (Bottom) 巾字底 jīnzìdǐ
- Japanese name(s): 巾/はば haba 幅偏/はばへん habahen 巾偏/きんへん/きんべん kinhen/kinben
- Hangul: 수건 sugeon

Stroke order animation

Radical 50 or radical turban (巾部) meaning "turban" or "scarf" is one of the 31 Kangxi radicals (214 radicals total) composed of three strokes.

In the Kangxi Dictionary, there are 295 characters (out of 49,030) to be found under this radical.

巾 is also the 40th indexing component in the Table of Indexing Chinese Character Components predominantly adopted by Simplified Chinese dictionaries published in mainland China.

== Evolution ==
Oracle bone script character

Bronze script character

Large seal script character

Small seal script character

=== 巿 ===
Large seal script

Small seal script

=== 市 (city; market) ===
Phono-semantic compound: semantic 兮 ("bustling") + phonetic 之 (OC *tjɯ).

Bronze script character

Large seal script

Small seal script

=== 帝 (sovereign) ===
Shang dynasty oracle bone script

Western Zhou oracle bone script

Shang dynasty bronze script

Western Zhou bronze script

Spring and Autumn period bronze script

Warring States period bronze script

Chu slip and silk script

Qin slip script

Shuowen ancient script

Small seal script

=== 帚 (broom) ===
Shang dynasty oracle bone script

Western Zhou bronze script

Large seal script

Small seal script

== Derived characters ==
Strokes	Characters
+0	巾
+1	巿 帀 币^{SC} (=幣)
+2	市 布 帄 帅^{SC} (=帥)
+3	帆 帇 师^{SC} (=師)
+4	帉 帊 帋 (=紙 -> 糸) 希 帍 帎 帏 (幃) 帐^{SC} (=帳)
+5	帑 帒 帓 帔 帕 帖 帗 帘 帙 帚 帛 帜^{SC} (=幟)
+6	帝 帞 帟 帠 帡 帢 帣 帤 帥 带^{SC} (=帶) 帧^{SC} (=幀)
+7	帨 帩 帪 師 帬 (=裙 -> 衣) 席 帮^{SC} (=幫) 帯^{JP} (=帶) 帰^{JP} (=歸 -> 止) 帱^{SC} (=幬)
+8	帲^{Kangxi} (=帡) 帳 帴 帵 帶 帷 常 帹 帺 帻^{SC} (=幘) 帼^{SC} (=幗)
+9	帽 帾 帿 幀 幁 幂 幃 幄 幅 幆 幇^{JP} (=幫) 幉
+10	幊 幋 幌 幍 幎 幏 幐
+11	幈 幑 幒 幓 幔 幕 幖 幗 幘 幙 幚 (=幫) 幛
+12	幜 幝 幞 幟 幠 幡 幢 幣 幤 幥
+13	幦 幧 幨 幩
+14	幪 幫 幬
+15	幭 幮 幯
+16	幰
+17	幱

== Literature ==
- Fazzioli, Edoardo (1987). Chinese calligraphy : from pictograph to ideogram : the history of 214 essential Chinese/Japanese characters. calligraphy by Rebecca Hon Ko. New York: Abbeville Press. ISBN 0-89659-774-1.
- Lunde, Ken (Jan 5, 2009). "Appendix J: Japanese Character Sets" (PDF). CJKV Information Processing: Chinese, Japanese, Korean & Vietnamese Computing (Second ed.). Sebastopol, Calif.: O'Reilly Media. ISBN 978-0-596-51447-1.
