= Ambiguities in Chinese character simplification =

A number of Chinese characters are simplified-traditional multipairings (简繁一对多; 簡繁一對多), which do not have a one-to-one mapping between their simplified and traditional forms.

This is usually because the simplification process merged two or more distinct characters into one. In most cases, these traditional characters are homonyms, having the same pronunciation but different meanings. As a result, converting text from simplified to traditional characters is difficult to automate, especially in the case of common characters such as Simplified: 后 ⇄ Traditional: 后後 (behind, empress), S: 表 ⇄ T: 表錶 (table, clock), S: 奸 ⇄ T: 奸姦 (traitor, rape) and more.

In a smaller number of cases, a single traditional character is mapped to multiple simplified characters for different uses, which occurs because the simplification scheme contains a list of bespoke simplifications for certain heavily-used meanings.

The following is an exhaustive list of all characters whose simplified and traditional forms do not map in a one-to-one manner. Simplified characters are prefixed with "S", and traditional characters with "T".

== 1 to 2 ==
S: 万 ⇄ T: 万萬 S: 丑 ⇄ T: 丑醜 S: 丰 ⇄ T: 丰豐 S: 于 ⇄ T: 于於 S: 云 ⇄ T: 云雲 S: 亘 ⇄ T: 亘亙 S: 仆 ⇄ T: 仆僕 S: 仑 ⇄ T: 侖崙 S: 价 ⇄ T: 价價 S: 仿 ⇄ T: 彷徬 S: 优 ⇄ T: 优優 S: 体 ⇄ T: 体體 S: 佣 ⇄ T: 佣傭 S: 克 ⇄ T: 克剋 S: 党 ⇄ T: 党黨 S: 冬 ⇄ T: 冬鼕 S: 冲 ⇄ T: 沖衝 S: 准 ⇄ T: 准準 S: 几 ⇄ T: 几幾 S: 出 ⇄ T: 出齣 S: 划 ⇄ T: 划劃 S: 别 ⇄ T: 别彆 S: 刮 ⇄ T: 刮颳 S: 制 ⇄ T: 制製 S: 千 ⇄ T: 千韆 S: 卜 ⇄ T: 卜蔔 S: 卤 ⇄ T: 鹵滷 S: 卷 ⇄ T: 卷捲 S: 历 ⇄ T: 歷曆 S: 发 ⇄ T: 發髮 S: 叠 ⇄ T: 曡疊 S: 只 ⇄ T: 衹隻 S: 叶 ⇄ T: 叶葉 S: 吁 ⇄ T: 吁籲 S: 合 ⇄ T: 合閤 S: 吊 ⇄ T: 吊弔 S: 同 ⇄ T: 同衕 S: 后 ⇄ T: 后後 S: 向 ⇄ T: 向嚮 S: 吨 ⇄ T: 吨噸 S: 听 ⇄ T: 听聽 S: 周 ⇄ T: 周週 S: 咸 ⇄ T: 咸鹹 S: 咽 ⇄ T: 咽嚥 S: 哄 ⇄ T: 哄鬨 S: 喂 ⇄ T: 喂餵 S: 回 ⇄ T: 回迴 S: 团 ⇄ T: 團糰 S: 困 ⇄ T: 困睏 S: 圣 ⇄ T: 圣聖 S: 坏 ⇄ T: 坏壞 S: 坛 ⇄ T: 壇罈 S: 坝 ⇄ T: 垻壩 S: 复 ⇄ T: 復複 S: 夸 ⇄ T: 夸誇 S: 奸 ⇄ T: 奸姦 S: 姜 ⇄ T: 姜薑 S: 宁 ⇄ T: 宁寧 S: 它 ⇄ T: 它牠 S: 审 ⇄ T: 審讅 S: 家 ⇄ T: 家傢 S: 尽 ⇄ T: 盡儘 S: 局 ⇄ T: 局侷 S: 岭 ⇄ T: 岭嶺 S: 岳 ⇄ T: 岳嶽 S: 布 ⇄ T: 布佈 S: 帆 ⇄ T: 帆颿 S: 帘 ⇄ T: 帘簾 S: 广 ⇄ T: 广廣 S: 庄 ⇄ T: 庄莊 S: 庞 ⇄ T: 龐厖 S: 弥 ⇄ T: 彌瀰 S: 弦 ⇄ T: 弦絃 S: 当 ⇄ T: 當噹 S: 录 ⇄ T: 彔錄 S: 彩 ⇄ T: 彩綵 S: 御 ⇄ T: 御禦 S: 忏 ⇄ T: 忏懺 S: 志 ⇄ T: 志誌 S: 怀 ⇄ T: 怀懷 S: 怜 ⇄ T: 怜憐 S: 惊 ⇄ T: 惊驚 S: 愿 ⇄ T: 愿願 S: 才 ⇄ T: 才纔 S: 扎 ⇄ T: 扎紮 S: 扑 ⇄ T: 扑撲 S: 托 ⇄ T: 托託 S: 扰 ⇄ T: 扰擾 S: 折 ⇄ T: 折摺 S: 拐 ⇄ T: 拐枴 S: 挂 ⇄ T: 挂掛 S: 挨 ⇄ T: 挨捱 S: 据 ⇄ T: 据據 S: 摆 ⇄ T: 擺襬 S: 斗 ⇄ T: 斗鬥 S: 旋 ⇄ T: 旋鏇 S: 昆 ⇄ T: 昆崑 S: 曲 ⇄ T: 曲麯 S: 术 ⇄ T: 术術 S: 朱 ⇄ T: 朱硃 S: 朴 ⇄ T: 朴樸 S: 机 ⇄ T: 机機 S: 杆 ⇄ T: 杆桿 S: 杯 ⇄ T: 杯盃 S: 松 ⇄ T: 松鬆 S: 板 ⇄ T: 板闆 S: 极 ⇄ T: 极極 S: 柜 ⇄ T: 柜櫃 S: 栗 ⇄ T: 栗慄 S: 梁 ⇄ T: 梁樑 S: 欣 ⇄ T: 欣訢 S: 欲 ⇄ T: 欲慾 S: 汇 ⇄ T: 匯彙 S: 沈 ⇄ T: 沈瀋 S: 泞 ⇄ T: 泞濘 S: 注 ⇄ T: 注註 S: 洁 ⇄ T: 洁潔 S: 洒 ⇄ T: 洒灑 S: 洼 ⇄ T: 洼窪 S: 涂 ⇄ T: 涂塗 S: 涌 ⇄ T: 涌湧 S: 淀 ⇄ T: 淀澱 S: 游 ⇄ T: 游遊 S: 湿 ⇄ T: 濕溼 S: 漓 ⇄ T: 漓灕 S: 烟 ⇄ T: 煙菸 S: 症 ⇄ T: 症癥 S: 痒 ⇄ T: 痒癢 S: 眯 ⇄ T: 眯瞇 S: 确 ⇄ T: 确確 S: 离 ⇄ T: 离離 S: 秃 ⇄ T: 禿鵚 S: 秋 ⇄ T: 秋鞦 S: 种 ⇄ T: 种種 S: 稗 ⇄ T: 稗粺 S: 筑 ⇄ T: 筑築 S: 签 ⇄ T: 簽籤 S: 篱 ⇄ T: 篱籬 S: 糊 ⇄ T: 糊餬 S: 累 ⇄ T: 累纍 S: 纤 ⇄ T: 縴纖 S: 罔 ⇄ T: 罔網 S: 翳 ⇄ T: 翳瞖 S: 肮 ⇄ T: 肮骯 S: 肴 ⇄ T: 餚殽 S: 胜 ⇄ T: 胜勝 S: 脏 ⇄ T: 臟髒 S: 腊 ⇄ T: 腊臘 S: 腌 ⇄ T: 腌醃 S: 致 ⇄ T: 致緻 S: 舍 ⇄ T: 舍捨 S: 芸 ⇄ T: 芸蕓 S: 苏 ⇄ T: 蘇囌 S: 范 ⇄ T: 范範 S: 茧 ⇄ T: 茧繭 S: 荐 ⇄ T: 荐薦 S: 药 ⇄ T: 葯藥 S: 获 ⇄ T: 獲穫 S: 蔑 ⇄ T: 蔑衊 S: 虮 ⇄ T: 虮蟣 S: 蚕 ⇄ T: 蚕蠶 S: 蜡 ⇄ T: 蜡蠟 S: 表 ⇄ T: 表錶 S: 袒 ⇄ T: 袒襢 S: 证 ⇄ T: 證証 S: 谷 ⇄ T: 谷穀 S: 赞 ⇄ T: 贊讚 S: 趟 ⇄ T: 趟蹚 S: 踊 ⇄ T: 踊踴 S: 辟 ⇄ T: 辟闢 S: 适 ⇄ T: 适適 S: 适 ⇄ T: 适適 S: 郁 ⇄ T: 郁鬱 S: 酬 ⇄ T: 酬詶 S: 酸 ⇄ T: 酸痠 S: 采 ⇄ T: 采採 S: 里 ⇄ T: 里裏 S: 阖 ⇄ T: 闔閤 S: 雇 ⇄ T: 雇僱 S: 雕 ⇄ T: 雕鵰 S: 霉 ⇄ T: 霉黴 S: 面 ⇄ T: 面麵 S: 须 ⇄ T: 須鬚 S: 饥 ⇄ T: 飢饑 S: 鸩 ⇄ T: 鴆酖

== 1 to 3 ==
S: 冬 ⇄ T: 冬咚鼕 S: 叹 ⇄ T: 嘆歎叹 S: 并 ⇄ T: 并並併 S: 当 ⇄ T: 當儅噹 S: 沈 ⇄ T: 沈沉瀋 S: 熏 ⇄ T: 熏燻薰 S: 系 ⇄ T: 系係繫 S: 胡 ⇄ T: 胡鬍衚 S: 鬃 ⇄ T: 鬃騣鬉

== 1 to 4 ==
S: 台 ⇄ T: 台檯臺颱 S: 复 ⇄ T: 复復複覆 S: 欢 ⇄ T: 歡懽讙驩 S: 蒙 ⇄ T: 蒙懞濛矇

== 2 to 1 ==
T: 線 ⇄ S: 线缐 T: 著 ⇄ S: 著着

== Special cases ==
- S: 么 ⇄ T: 么麼, T: 麼 ⇄ S: 么麽:
  - yāo (tiny) is written 幺 or 么 in simplified and traditional.
  - me (particle expressing tact) and ma (interrogative particle) are written 么 (but not 幺) in simplified and 麼 or 麽 in traditional.
  - mó (insignificant) is written 麽 in simplified and 麼 or 麽 in traditional.
- S: 了 ⇄ T: 了瞭, T: 瞭 ⇄ S: 了瞭:
  - le (completed action marker) is written 了 in both simplified and traditional.
  - liǎo (bright, understand) is written 了 in simplified and 瞭 in traditional.
  - liào (to watch from a height or distance) is written 瞭 in both simplified and traditional.
- S: 什 ⇄ T: 什甚, T: 甚 ⇄ S: 什甚:
  - shí (ten, miscellaneous) is written 什 in both simplified and traditional.
  - shén (what) is written 什 in simplified and 什 or 甚 in traditional.
  - shèn (extremely, exceed) is written 甚 in both simplified and traditional.
- S: 伙 ⇄ T: 伙夥, T: 夥 ⇄ S: 伙夥:
  - huǒ (meals) is written 伙 in both simplified and traditional.
  - huǒ (partner, combine) is written 伙 in simplified and 夥 in traditional.
  - huǒ (many) is written 夥 in both simplified and traditional.
- S: 余 ⇄ T: 余餘, T: 餘 ⇄ S: 余馀:
  - yú (first person pronoun) is written 余 in simplified and traditional.
  - yú (to remain) is written 余 in simplified and 餘 in traditional.
  - Yú (a surname) is written 馀 in simplified and 餘 in traditional.
- S: 借 ⇄ T: 借藉, T: 藉 ⇄ S: 借藉:
  - jiè (to lend) is written 借 in both simplified and traditional.
  - jiè (to rely on) is written 借 in simplified and 藉 in traditional.
  - jiè (pad, mat) and jí (numerous and disorderly) are written 藉 in both simplified and traditional.
- S: 干 ⇄ T: 干乾幹, T: 乾 ⇄ S: 干乾:
  - gān (implication) and gàn (to defend) are written 干 in both simplified and traditional.
  - gān (dry) is written 干 in simplified and 乾 in traditional.
  - gàn (main part) is written 干 in simplified and 幹 in traditional.
  - qián (first of the bagua or first hexagram of the I Ching) is written 乾 in both simplified and traditional.
- S: 征 ⇄ T: 征徵, T: 徵 ⇄ S: 征徵:
  - zhēng (journey, campaign) is written 征 in both simplified and traditional.
  - zhēng (punish, seek, characteristic, levy) is written 征 in simplified and 徵 in traditional.
  - zhǐ (fourth note of the Chinese pentatonic scale) is written 徵 in both simplified and traditional.
- S: 恶 ⇄ T: 惡噁, T: 噁 ⇄ S: 恶𫫇:
  - è (evil) and wù (to hate) are written 恶 in simplified and 惡 in traditional.
  - ě (in ěxīn (nauseous)) is written 恶 in simplified and 噁 in traditional.
  - è (oxygen) is written 𫫇 in simplified and 噁 in traditional.
- S: 苎 ⇄ T: 苧, S: 苧 ⇄ T: 薴:
  - zhù (boehmeria) is written 苎 in simplified and 苧 in traditional.
  - níng (limonene) is written 苧 in simplified and 薴 in traditional.
- S: 苹 ⇄ T: 苹蘋, T: 蘋 ⇄ S: 苹𬞟:
  - píng (silvery wormwood) is written 苹 in simplified and traditional.
  - píng (in píngguǒ (apple)) is written 苹 in simplified and 蘋 in traditional.
  - pín (four-leaf clover) is written 𬞟 in simplified and 蘋 in traditional.
- S: 钟 ⇄ T: 鍾鐘, T: 鍾 ⇄ S: 钟锺:
  - zhōng (bell) is written 钟 in simplified and 鐘 in traditional.
  - zhōng (vessel for alcohol) is written 钟 in simplified and 鍾 in traditional.
  - Zhōng (a surname) is written 锺 in simplified and 鍾 in traditional.
