= Variant Chinese characters =

Chinese characters outside of a standard

Variant character
- Regional variants of the character 返 as rendered by the Source Han Sans font family

Chinese name
- Traditional Chinese: 異體字
- Simplified Chinese: 异体字
- Literal meaning: variant character form
Transcriptions
Standard Mandarin
- Hanyu Pinyin: yìtǐzì
Yue: Cantonese
- Yale Romanization: yihtáijih
- Jyutping: ji6-tai2-zi6

Alternative Chinese name
- Traditional Chinese: 又體
- Simplified Chinese: 又体
- Literal meaning: alternative form
Transcriptions
Standard Mandarin
- Hanyu Pinyin: yòutǐ
Yue: Cantonese
- Yale Romanization: yauhtái
- Jyutping: jau6-tai2

Second alternative Chinese name
- Traditional Chinese: 或體
- Simplified Chinese: 或体
- Literal meaning: or form
Transcriptions
Standard Mandarin
- Hanyu Pinyin: huòtǐ
Yue: Cantonese
- Yale Romanization: waahktái
- Jyutping: waak6-tai2

Third alternative Chinese name
- Chinese: 重文
- Literal meaning: alternative writing
Transcriptions
Standard Mandarin
- Hanyu Pinyin: chóngwén
Yue: Cantonese
- Yale Romanization: chùngmàn
- Jyutping: cung4-man4

Vietnamese name
- Vietnamese alphabet: chữ dị thể
- Hán-Nôm: 𡨸異體

Korean name
- Hangul: 이체자
- Hanja: 異體字
Transcriptions
- Revised Romanization: icheja

Japanese name
- Kyūjitai: 異體字
- Shinjitai: 異体字
Transcriptions
- Romanization: itaiji
- Kunrei-shiki: itaizi

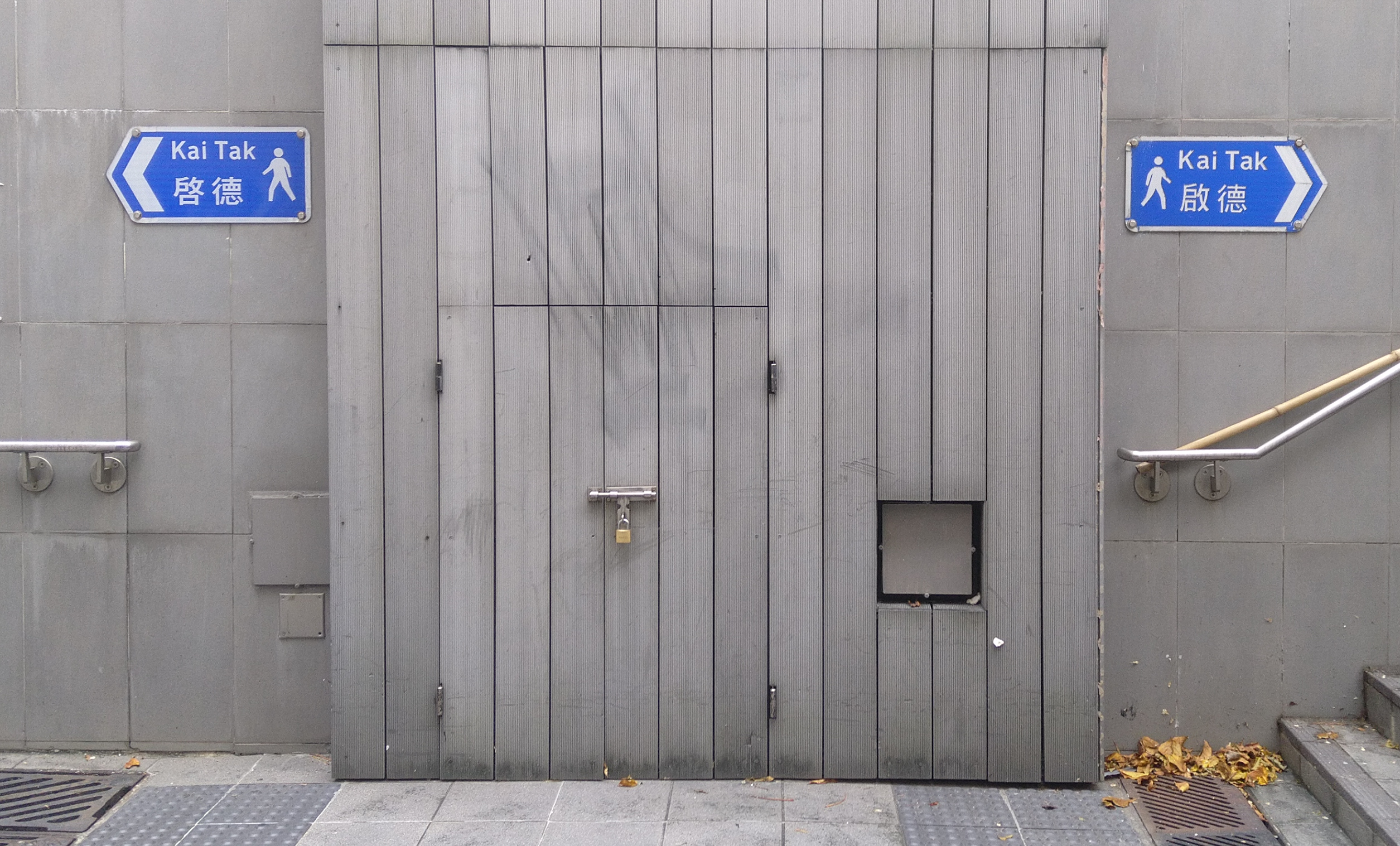
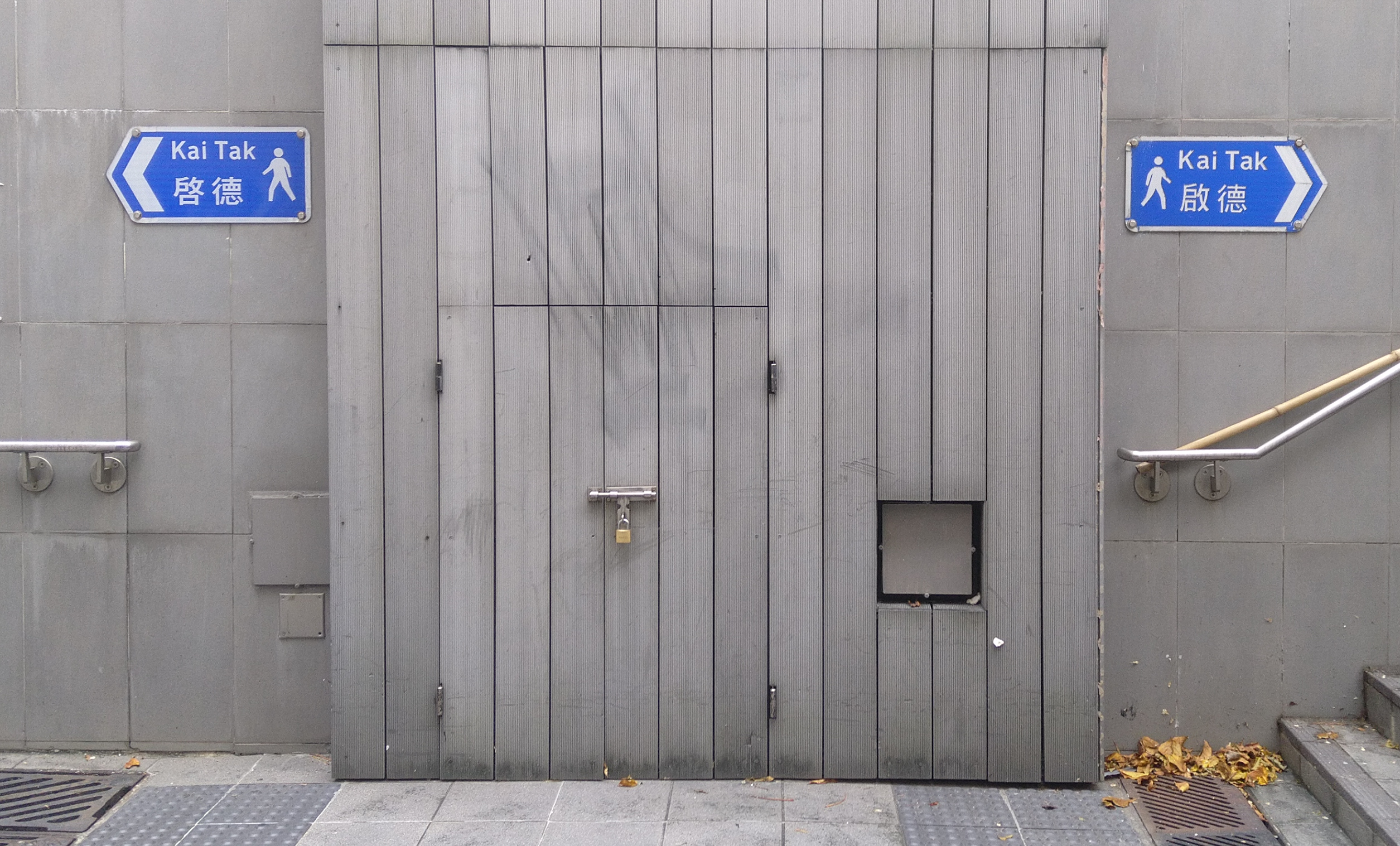
Two road signs in San Po Kong, Hong Kong, indicating the same name for Kai Tak with different variants (啓 and 啟) of the character for "Kai".

Chinese characters may have several variant forms—visually distinct glyphs that represent the same underlying meaning and pronunciation. Variants of a given character are allographs of one another, and many are directly analogous to allographs present in the English alphabet, such as the double-storey ⟨a⟩ and single-storey ⟨ɑ⟩ variants of the letter A, with the latter more commonly appearing in handwriting. Some contexts require usage of specific variants.

== Nature of variants ==
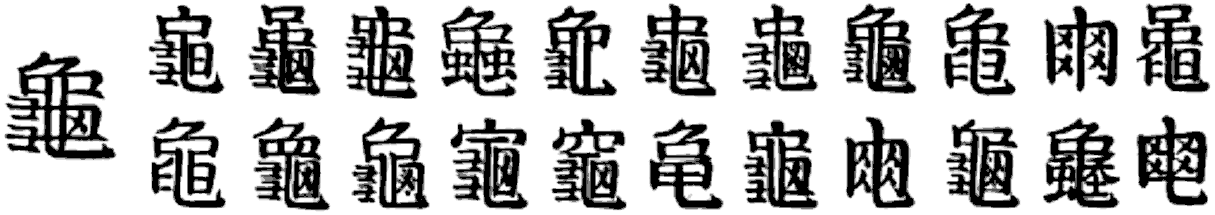
Variants of the character guī (龟; 龜; 'turtle') collected from printed sources c. 1800

5 of the 30 variant characters found in the preface of the Kangxi Dictionary not found in the dictionary itself

Before the 20th century, variation in the shape of characters was ubiquitous, a dynamic which continued after the invention of woodblock printing. For example, prior to the Qin dynasty (221–206 BC) the character meaning 'bright' was written as either 明 or 朙—with either 日 'Sun' or 囧 'window' on the left, with the 月 'Moon' component on the right. Li Si (d. 208 BC), the Chancellor of Qin, attempted to universalize the Qin small seal script across China following the wars that had politically unified the country for the first time. Li prescribed the 朙 form of the word for 'bright', but some scribes ignored this and continued to write the character as 明. However, the increased usage of 朙 was followed by proliferation of a third variant: 眀, with 目 'eye' on the left—likely derived as a contraction of 朙. Ultimately, 明 became the character's standard form.

New variants also result from larger shifts in the writing system as a whole, such as the process of libian and liding that resulted in the clerical script. According to the palaeographer Qiu Xigui, the broadest trend in the evolution of Chinese characters over their history has been simplification, both in graphical shape (字形; zìxíng), the "external appearances of individual graphs", and in graphical form (字体; 字體; zìtǐ), "overall changes in the distinguishing features of graphic[al] shape and calligraphic style, [...] in most cases refer[ring] to rather obvious and rather substantial changes". Libian often involved significant omissions, additions, or transmutations of the forms used by Qin small seal script, while liding is the direct regularization and linearization of shapes to convert them into clerical forms while preserving their original structure. For example, the character for 'year' underwent liding to the clerical script form 秊, while the same character after undergoing libian resulted in the orthodox form 年. Similarly, libian and liding created the two distinct characters 虎 and 乕 for 'tiger'.

There are variants that arise through the use of different radicals to refer to specific definitions of a polysemous character. For instance, the character 雕 could mean either 'a type of hawk' or 'carve'. Variants using different radicals to specify thus developed: respectively 鵰, with a ⿃ 'BIRD' radical, and 琱, with a ⽟ 'JADE' radical.

In rare cases, two characters in ancient Chinese with similar meanings were confused and conflated when their modern Chinese readings merged, for example, 飢 and 饑, are both read as jī and mean 'famine', used interchangeably in the modern language, even though 飢 initially meant 'insufficient food to satiate' and 饑 meant 'famine' in Old Chinese. The two characters formerly belonged to two different Old Chinese rime groups (脂 and 微 groups, respectively) which indicates they had different pronunciations in the past. A similar situation is responsible for the existence of variants of the particle 於 'in' which had the ancient form 于, now used as its simplified form. In each case above, variants were merged into single simplified forms.

== Orthodoxy ==
Character forms that are most orthodox are known as orthodox variants (正字; zhèngzì), which is sometimes taken as mean the forms present in the Kangxi Dictionary (康熙字典體; Kāngxī zìdiǎn tǐ), which usually represent the orthodox forms used in late imperial China. Non-orthodox forms are known as folk variants (俗字; súzì; Revised Romanization: sokja; Hepburn: zokuji). Some folk variants are longstanding abbreviations or calligraphic forms, and later became the basis for the simplified forms adopted on the mainland. For example, 痴 is a folk variant corresponding to the orthodox form 癡 'foolish'. These forms differ by their phonetic component, with the folk variant using a character with a "close enough" pronunciation but having much fewer strokes and thus quicker to write. In mainland China, simplified forms are called xin zixing, typically contrasting with jiu zixing, which are usually the Kangxi form.

Orthodox and vulgar forms may only differ by the length or location of individual strokes, whether certain strokes intersect, or the presence or absence of minor strokes (dots). These are often not considered to amount to being discrete variants. For instance, 述 is the new form of the character with traditional orthography 述 'recount', 'describe'. As another example, the surname 吴, also the name of an ancient state, is the 'new character shape' form of the character traditionally written 吳.

== Regional standards ==
From right to left: Kangxi Dictionary forms, standards in Mainland China, Hong Kong, Taiwan, and Japan; significant differences are highlighted in yellow. (Note: 玄 is not written completely in the Kangxi Dictionary due to the naming taboo prohibiting writing the characters of an Emperor's given name. 玄, as well as all compounds using it as a component, lack the final dot stroke. The final vertical stroke in 燁 is also omitted.)

Character variance has existed throughout every writing system that uses Chinese characters, including written Chinese, Japanese, and Korean. Several governments of countries that speak these languages have standardized their writing systems by specifying certain variants as the standard form. The choice of which variants to use has resulted in some bifurcation of written Chinese between simplified and traditional forms. The standardization of simplified forms in Japan was distinct from the process in mainland China.

The standard character forms prescribed by the government of each region are described in:

- The List of Commonly Used Standard Chinese Characters for mainland China
- The List of Graphemes of Commonly-Used Chinese Characters for Hong Kong (educational usage only)
- The Standard Form of National Characters for Taiwan (educational usage only)
- The list of jōyō kanji for Japan
- The Kangxi Dictionary in Korea

== Use in computing ==
Twelve variants of the character 劍 jiàn 'sword' that vary both in which components are used, as well as which specific allographs are used for said components: On the left side, 僉, 㑒 and 佥 qiān are allographs of the same phonetic component.; On the right side, 刂 'KNIFE', 釒 'GOLD', and 刃 'blade edge' are each distinct signific components used by the different variants. 刄 is an allograph of 刃.

Unicode deals with variant characters in a complex manner, as a result of the process of Han unification. In Han unification, some variants that are nearly identical between Chinese-, Japanese- and Korean-speaking regions are encoded in the same code point, and can only be distinguished using different typefaces. Other variants that are more divergent are encoded in different code points. On webpages, displaying the correct variants for the intended language is dependent on the typefaces installed on the computer, the configuration of the web browser and the language tags of web pages. Systems that are ready to display the correct variants are rare because many computer users do not have standard typefaces installed and the most popular web browsers are not configured to display the correct variants by default. The following are some examples of variant forms of Chinese characters with different code points and language tags.

Different code points
| Chinese | | | Japanese | Korean |
| Mainland | Taiwan | Hong Kong | Japanese | Korean |
|---|---|---|---|---|
| 戶戸户 | 戶戸户 | 戶戸户 | 戶戸户 | 戶戸户 |
| 爲為为 | 爲為为 | 爲為为 | 爲為为 | 爲為为 |
| 強强 | 強强 | 強强 | 強强 | 強强 |
| 畫畵画 | 畫畵画 | 畫畵画 | 畫畵画 | 畫畵画 |
| 線綫线 | 線綫线 | 線綫线 | 線綫线 | 線綫线 |
| 匯滙 | 匯滙 | 匯滙 | 匯滙 | 匯滙 |
| 裏裡 | 裏裡 | 裏裡 | 裏裡 | 裏裡 |
| 夜亱 | 夜亱 | 夜亱 | 夜亱 | 夜亱 |
| 龜亀龟 | 龜亀龟 | 龜亀龟 | 龜亀龟 | 龜亀龟 |

The following examples have the same code points, but different language tags. However language tags rarely work correctly to get the expected forms from text renderers (e.g. in the table below where all rendered glyphs may look the same).

Same code point, different language tags
| Chinese | | | Japanese | Korean |
| Mainland | Taiwan | Hong Kong | Japanese | Korean |
|---|---|---|---|---|
| 刃 | 刃 | 刃 | 刃 | 刃 |
| 令 | 令 | 令 | 令 | 令 |
| 毒 | 毒 | 毒 | 毒 | 毒 |
| 骨 | 骨 | 骨 | 骨 | 骨 |
| 縣 | 縣 | 縣 | 縣 | 縣 |
| 誤 | 誤 | 誤 | 誤 | 誤 |
| 船 | 船 | 船 | 船 | 船 |
| 述 | 述 | 述 | 述 | 述 |
| 煙 | 煙 | 煙 | 煙 | 煙 |
| 贈 | 贈 | 贈 | 贈 | 贈 |
| 雪 | 雪 | 雪 | 雪 | 雪 |
| 及 | 及 | 及 | 及 | 及 |
| 角 | 角 | 角 | 角 | 角 |
| 條 | 條 | 條 | 條 | 條 |
| 扁 | 扁 | 扁 | 扁 | 扁 |
| 低 | 低 | 低 | 低 | 低 |

Instead, the Unicode standard allows encoding these variants as variation sequences, by appending a variation selector (a glyph-less non-spacing mark) to the standard CJK unified ideograph (it also works directly inside plain text, without needing to use any rich text format to select the appropriate language or script, and allows easier and more selective control when the same language/script combination needs several variants). The list of valid variation sequences is standardized by Unicode, defined in the Ideographic Variation Database (IVD), part of the Unicode Characters Database (UCD), and it is expansible without reencoding new code points in the UCS (and since the Unicode versions where variation selectors were encoded and the IVD established, it's no longer needed to encode any new compatibility ideograph to render them; the two blocks CJK Compatibility Ideographs in the BMP and CJK Compatibility Ideographs Supplement in the SIP are now frozen since Unicode 4.1, except to fix a few past mistakes that were forgotten during the Han unification process for the review of normative sources).

== See also ==
- Ryakuji – Form of shorthand for writing kanji
- Z-variant – Glyphs with minor typographical differences
- Variant form (Unicode) – Alternate glyph for a character in Unicode
- Chinese character rationalization
