= Radical 199 =

Chinese character radical

麥
- Radical 199 (U+2FC6)
- 麥 (U+9EA5) "wheat"

Pronunciations
- Pinyin: mài
- Bopomofo: ㄇㄞˋ
- Wade–Giles: mai4
- Cantonese Yale: mak6
- Jyutping: mak6, maak6
- Japanese Kana: バク baku (on'yomi) むぎ mugi (kun'yomi)
- Sino-Korean: 맥 maek
- Hán-Việt: mạch

Names
- Japanese name(s): 麦/むぎ mugi 麦繞/ばくにょう baku
- Hangul: 보리 bori

Stroke order animation

Stroke order of the simplified form 麦 in Chinese

Stroke order of the simplified form 麦 in Japanese

Radical 199 or radical wheat (麥部) meaning "wheat" is one of the 6 Kangxi radicals (214 radicals in total) composed of 11 strokes.

In the Kangxi Dictionary, there are 131 characters (out of 49,030) to be found under this radical.

麦 (7 strokes), the simplified form of 麥, is the 149th indexing component in the Table of Indexing Chinese Character Components predominantly adopted by Simplified Chinese dictionaries published in mainland China, while the traditional form 麥 is listed as its associated indexing component. 麦 is also the simplified form used in Japanese.

== Evolution ==
Phono-semantic compound phonetic 來 (OC *m·rɯːɡ) + semantic 夊 ("footprint pointing down; to walk slowly");

Oracle bone script character

Bronze script character

Large seal script character

Small seal script character

=== 來 ===
來 (Simplified Chinese & shinjitai: 来) was the original character for 麥; similar to 木 and 禾 but unrelated to 米 and 釆.

Oracle bone script character

Bronze script character

Chu slip and silk script

Large seal script character

Small seal script character

== Derived characters ==
Strokes	Characters (麥)	Characters (麦)
+0	麥	麦^{SC/JP} (=麥)
+3	麧	
+4	麨 麩 麪^{HK} (=麵) 麫 (=麵)	麸^{SC}/麸^{JP} (=麩)
+5	麬 (=麩) 麭 麮	
+6	麯 (=麴) 麰	
+7	麱 麲	
+8	麳 麴	麹^{SC}/麹^{JP} (=麴)
+9	麵	麺^{SC nonstandard}/麺^{JP} (=麵)
+11	麶	
+18	麷	

== Sinogram ==
As an independent sinogram 麦 is a Chinese character. It is one of the Kyōiku kanji or Kanji taught in elementary school in Japan. It is a second grade kanji.

== Literature ==
- Fazzioli, Edoardo (1987). Chinese calligraphy : from pictograph to ideogram : the history of 214 essential Chinese/Japanese characters. calligraphy by Rebecca Hon Ko. New York: Abbeville Press. ISBN 0-89659-774-1.
- Lunde, Ken (Jan 5, 2009). "Appendix J: Japanese Character Sets" (PDF). CJKV Information Processing: Chinese, Japanese, Korean & Vietnamese Computing (Second ed.). Sebastopol, Calif.: O'Reilly Media. ISBN 978-0-596-51447-1.
