= Radical 191 =

Chinese character radical

鬥
- Radical 191 (U+2FBE)
- 鬥 (U+9B25) "fight"

Pronunciations
- Pinyin: dòu
- Bopomofo: ㄉㄡˋ
- Wade–Giles: tou4
- Cantonese Yale: dau3
- Jyutping: dau3
- Japanese Kana: トウ tō (on'yomi) たたか-う tataka-u (kun'yomi)
- Sino-Korean: 투 tu
- Hán-Việt: đấu, dấu

Names
- Japanese name(s): 闘構/たたかいがまえ/とうがまえ tatakaigamae / tōgamae
- Hangul: 싸울 ssaul

Stroke order animation

Radical 191 or radical fight (鬥部) meaning "fight" is one of the 8 Kangxi radicals (214 radicals in total) composed of 10 strokes.

In the Kangxi Dictionary, there are 23 characters (out of 49,030) to be found under this radical.

鬥 is also the 190th indexing component in the Table of Indexing Chinese Character Components predominantly adopted by Simplified Chinese dictionaries published in mainland China. However, this radical character 鬥 and former radical 169 門 "door" were merged to 门 during the simplification. 鬥 is therefore no longer in use in Simplified Chinese and is retained as an indexing component only for historical reasons.

== Evolution ==
Oracle bone script character

Large seal script character

Small seal script character

== Derived characters ==
Strokes	Characters
+0	鬥
+4	鬦 (=鬥)
+5	鬧
+6	鬨
+8	鬩
+10	鬪 (=鬥)
+12	鬫
+14	(=鬭) 鬭 (=鬥)
+17	鬮

== Literature ==
- Fazzioli, Edoardo (1987). Chinese calligraphy : from pictograph to ideogram : the history of 214 essential Chinese/Japanese characters. calligraphy by Rebecca Hon Ko. New York: Abbeville Press. ISBN 0-89659-774-1.
- Lunde, Ken (Jan 5, 2009). "Appendix J: Japanese Character Sets" (PDF). CJKV Information Processing: Chinese, Japanese, Korean & Vietnamese Computing (Second ed.). Sebastopol, Calif.: O'Reilly Media. ISBN 978-0-596-51447-1.
