= Radical 169 =

Chinese character radical

門
- Radical 169 (U+2FA8)
- 門 (U+9580) "gate, door"

Pronunciations
- Pinyin: mén
- Bopomofo: ㄇㄣˊ
- Wade–Giles: men2
- Cantonese Yale: mun4
- Jyutping: mun4
- Japanese Kana: モン mon (on'yomi) かど kado (kun'yomi)
- Sino-Korean: 문 mun
- Hán-Việt: môn, món, mon

Names
- Chinese name(s): 門字框/门字框 ménzìkuàng
- Japanese name(s): 門構/もんがまえ/かどがまえ mongamae/kadogamae
- Hangul: 문 mun

Stroke order animation

Stroke order of the simplified form 门

Radical 169 or radical gate (門部) meaning "gate" or "door" is one of the 9 Kangxi radicals (214 radicals in total) composed of 8 strokes.

In the Kangxi Dictionary, there are 246 characters (out of 49,030) to be found under this radical.

门, the simplified form of 門, is the 47th indexing component in the Table of Indexing Chinese Character Components predominantly adopted by Simplified Chinese dictionaries published in mainland China, while the traditional form 門 is listed as its associated indexing component.

== Evolution ==
Two doors (戶); unrelated to 円 ("Yen") and 鬥.

Shang dynasty Oracle bone script

Shang dynasty Bronze script

Western Zhou Bronze script

Chu slip and silk script

Qin slip script

Large seal script character

Small seal script character

== Derived characters ==
Strokes	Characters (門)	Characters (门)
+0	門	门^{SC} (=門)
+1	閁 閂	闩^{SC} (=閂)
+2	閃 閄 閅 (=門)	闪^{SC} (=閃)
+3	閆 閇 (=閉) 閈 閉 閊	闫^{SC} (=閆) 闬 (=閈) 闭^{SC} (=閉) 问^{SC} (=問 -> 口) 闯^{SC} (=闖)
+4	開 閌 閍 閎 閏 閐 閑 閒 間 閔 閕 閖 閗 (=鬥 -> 鬥)	闰^{SC} (=閏) 闱^{SC} (=闈) 闲^{SC} (=閒) 闳^{SC} (=閎) 间^{SC} (=間) 闵^{SC} (=閔) 闶^{SC} (=閌) 闷^{SC} (=悶 -> 心)
+5	閘 閙 (=鬧 -> 鬥) 閚 閛 閜 閝 閞 閟 閠 (=閏)	闸^{SC} (=閘) 闹^{SC} (=鬧 -> 鬥)
+6	閡 関^{JP} (=關) 閣 閤 閥 閦 閧 (=鬨 -> 鬥 / 巷 -> 己) 閨 閩 閪	闺^{SC} (=閨) 闻^{SC} (=聞 -> 耳) 闼^{SC} (=闥) 闽^{SC} (=閩) 闾^{SC} (=閭) 闿^{SC} (=闓) 阀^{SC} (=閥) 阁^{SC} (=閣) 阂^{SC} (=閡)
+7	閫 閬 閭 閮 閯 閰 閱 閲^{JP/HK/GB TC} (=閱) 閳 (=闡) 閴	阃^{SC} (=閫) 阄^{SC} (=鬮 -> 鬥) 阅^{SC} (=閱) 阆^{SC} (=閬)
+8	閵 閶 閸 閹 閺 閻 閼 閽 閾 閿 闀 闁 (=褒 -> 衣) 闂	阇^{SC} (=闍) 阈^{SC} (=閾) 阉^{SC} (=閹) 阊^{SC} (=閶) 阋^{SC} (=鬩 -> 鬥) 阌^{SC} (=閿) 阍^{SC} (=閽) 阎^{SC} (=閻) 阏^{SC} (=閼) 阐^{SC} (=闡)
+9	閷 (=殺 -> 殳) 闃 闄 闅 闆 闇 闈 闉 闊 闋 闌 闍 闎 闏	阑^{SC} (=闌) 阒^{SC} (=闃) 阓^{SC} (=闠) 阔^{SC} (=闊) 阕^{SC} (=闋)
+10	闐 闑 闒 闓 闔 闕 闖 闗 (=關) 闘^{JP} (=鬥 -> 鬥)	阖^{SC} (=闔) 阗^{SC} (=闐) 阘^{SC} (=闒) 阙^{SC} (=闕)
+11	闙 闚 闛 關 闝 阚^{SC} (=闞)	
+12	闞 闟 闠 闡	
+13	闢 闣 闤 闥 闦 阛^{SC} (=闤)	
+14	闧	

== Sinogram ==
Alone it is a Chinese character. It is one of the Kyōiku kanji or Kanji taught in elementary school in Japan. It is a second grade kanji.

== Literature ==
- Fazzioli, Edoardo (1987). Chinese calligraphy : from pictograph to ideogram : the history of 214 essential Chinese/Japanese characters. calligraphy by Rebecca Hon Ko. New York: Abbeville Press. ISBN 0-89659-774-1.
