= Xin zixing =

Standard simplified character forms

The xin zixing (Chinese: 新字形; pinyin: xīn zìxíng; Jyutping: san1 zi6jing4; lit. 'new character forms') are a set of standardized Chinese character forms. It is based on the 1964 "List of character forms of Common Chinese characters for Publishing" (印刷通用汉字字形表; Yìnshuà Tōngyòng Hànzì Zìxíngbiǎo) as compared to jiu zixing. The standard is based on regular script and popular characters, and changes are made to the printed version of Song (Ming) typefaces. This standard covers the simplified and traditional characters, which separates it from other standards. SimSun font uses this standard, which shows variation with other regional standards such as MingLiU and Taiwan's KaiU, and with the regular script version of SimKai, which is the written character standard for China.

Taiwan's Standard Form of National Characters made changes to the printed version of Mingsong typefaces, varying greatly from the Table of Common Chinese character in printing press and featuring drastic changes to the Ming typefaces, e.g. changing ⻍ and 辶 to ⻎. The usage of calling the Standard Form of National Characters the xin zixing is more common in areas using traditional characters.

== Characteristics ==
The xin zixing adopted various popular forms of its characters. For example:

- 群 The orthodox form of this character has 君 above 羊, i.e. 羣.
- 峰 The orthodox form of this character has 山 above 夆, i.e. 峯.
- 令 The orthodox form of this character has 亼 above 卩, i.e. 令.
  - Derived new characters: 冷 (冷), 铃/鈴 (鈴), etc.
- 兑 The orthodox form of this character is 兌.
  - Derived new characters: 税 (稅), 说/説 (說), etc.
- 青 The orthodox form of this character is 靑.
  - Derived new characters: 清 (淸), 静 (靜), etc.
- 幾 The orthodox form of this character is 幾.
- 卬 The orthodox form of this character is 卭 (3 strokes become 2 strokes).
- 印 The orthodox form of this character is 印 (4 strokes become 3 strokes).
- 熙 The orthodox form of this character is 煕.

However, it does adopt certain more orthodox variants, compared to the Taiwan and Hong Kong standards:

- 爲 the vulgar form of this character is 為 and the orthodox form of this character is 爲 with the second and fourth strokes pointing out.

== Standards ==
- List of character forms of Common Chinese characters for Publishing (1965) (Chinese: 印刷通用汉字字形表; pinyin: Yìnshuà Tōngyòng Hànzì Zìxíngbiǎo) is the first version of xin zixing.
- List of General Used Characters in Modern Chinese (1988) (Chinese: 现代汉语通用字表; pinyin: Xiàndài Hànyǔ Tōngyòng Zìbiǎo) defines the number of Chinese characters that should be used and the difference between Simplified and Traditional Chinese. The second version of xin zixing is defined in the appendix of Xiandai Hanyu Tongyong Zibiao and Xiandai Hanyu Changyong Zibiao.
- List of Generally Used Standardized Chinese characters (2013) (Chinese: 通用规范汉字表; pinyin: Tōngyòng Guīfàn Hànzìbiǎo) defines the number of Chinese characters that should be used and the difference between Simplified and Traditional Chinese. The third version of xin zixing is defined in the appendix of List of Generally Used Standardized Chinese characters.

== See also ==
- jiu zixing
- Standard Form of National Characters
