= Radical 177 =

Chinese character radical

革
- Radical 177 (U+2FB0)
- 革 (U+9769) "leather, rawhide"

Pronunciations
- Pinyin: gé
- Bopomofo: ㄍㄜˊ
- Wade–Giles: ko2
- Cantonese Yale: gaak3, gaap3
- Jyutping: gaak3, gaap3
- Japanese Kana: カク kaku (on'yomi) かわ kawa / あらた-める arata-meru (kun'yomi)
- Sino-Korean: 혁 hyeok
- Hán-Việt: cách

Names
- Japanese name(s): 革偏/かわへん kawahen
- Hangul: 가죽 gajuk

Stroke order animation

Radical 177 or radical leather (革部) meaning "leather" or "rawhide" is one of the 11 Kangxi radicals (214 radicals in total) composed of 9 strokes.

In the Kangxi Dictionary, there are 305 characters (out of 49,030) to be found under this radical.

革 is also the 179th indexing component in the Table of Indexing Chinese Character Components predominantly adopted by Simplified Chinese dictionaries published in mainland China.

== Evolution ==
Shang dynasty Oracle bone script

Western Zhou Bronze script

Large seal script

Small seal script

== Derived characters ==
Strokes	Characters
+0	革
+2	靪
+3	靫 靬 靭^{JP} (=韌 -> 韋) 靮 靯 靰 靱 (=韌 -> 韋)
+4	靲 靳 靴 靵 靶 靷 靸 靹
+5	靺 靻 靼 靽 靾 靿 鞀 鞁 鞂 鞃 鞄 鞅 鞆
+6	鞇 鞈 鞉 (=鞀) 鞊 鞋 鞌 (=鞍) 鞍 鞎 鞏 鞐 鞑^{SC} (=韃) 鞒^{SC} (=鞽)
+7	鞓 鞔 鞕 鞖 鞗 鞘 鞙
+8	鞚 鞛 (=琫 -> 玉) 鞜 鞝 鞞 鞟 鞠 鞡
+9	鞢 鞣 鞤 鞥 鞦 鞧 鞨 鞩 鞪 鞫 鞬 鞭 鞮 鞯^{SC} (=韉) 鞰 (=韞 -> 韋)
+10	鞱 鞲 鞳 鞴 鞵 (=鞋) 鞶 鞷
+11	鞸 鞹 鞺 鞻
+12	鞼 鞽 鞾 鞿
+13	韀 韁 韂 韃
+14	韄 韅
+15	韆 韇 韈 (=襪 -> 衣)
+17	韉
+21	韊

== Sinogram ==
The radical is also used as an independent Chinese character. It is one of the Kyōiku kanji or Kanji taught in elementary school in Japan. It is a fifth grade kanji.

== Literature ==
- Fazzioli, Edoardo (1987). Chinese calligraphy : from pictograph to ideogram : the history of 214 essential Chinese/Japanese characters. calligraphy by Rebecca Hon Ko. New York: Abbeville Press. ISBN 0-89659-774-1.
