= Radical 115 =

Chinese character radical

禾
- Radical 115 (U+2F72)
- 禾 (U+79BE) "grain"

Pronunciations
- Pinyin: hé
- Bopomofo: ㄏㄜˊ
- Gwoyeu Romatzyh: her
- Wade–Giles: ho^{2}
- Cantonese Yale: wòh
- Jyutping: wo4
- Japanese Kana: カ ka (on'yomi) いね ine (kun'yomi)
- Sino-Korean: 화 hwa

Names
- Chinese name(s): 禾字旁 hézìpáng
- Japanese name(s): 禾/いね ine (Left) 禾偏/いねへん inehen (Informal) ノ木/のぎ nogi (Left, informal) ノ偏/のぎへん nogihen
- Hangul: 벼 byeo

Stroke order animation

Radical 115 or radical grain (禾部) meaning "grain" is one of the 23 Kangxi radicals (214 radicals in total) composed of 5 strokes.

In the Kangxi Dictionary, there are 431 characters (out of 49,030) to be found under this radical.

禾 is also the 111th indexing component in the Table of Indexing Chinese Character Components predominantly adopted by Simplified Chinese dictionaries published in mainland China.

== Evolution ==
Similar to 木 and 來; unrelated to 釆.

Oracle bone script character

Bronze script character

Large seal script character

Small seal script character

== Derived characters ==
| Strokes | Characters |
|---|---|
| +0 | 禾 |
| +2 | 禿 秀 私 利 秂 秃^{SC} (=禿) |
| +3 | 秄 秅 秆^{SC} (=稈) 秇 秈 秉 秊 (=年 -> 干) |
| +4 | 秋 (also SC form of 鞦 -> 革) 秌 (=秋) 种 (also SC form of 種) 秎 秏 (=耗 -> 耒) 秐 科 秒 (=藐 -> 艸) 秓 秔 (=粳 -> 米) 秕 秖 秗 |
| +5 | 秘 秙 秚 秛 秜 秝 秞 租 秠 秡 秢 秣 秤 秥 秦 秧 秨 秩 秪 秫 秬 秭 秮 积^{SC} (=積) 称^{SC}/称^{JP} (=稱) |
| +6 | 秱 秲 秳 秴 秵 秶 秷 秸 秹 秺 移 秼 秽^{SC} (=穢) 秾^{SC} (=穠) 稆^{SC} (=穭) |
| +7 | 秿 稀 稁 稂 稃 稄 稅 稇 稈 稉 (=粳 -> 米) 稊 程 稌 稍 税^{SC/JP} (=稅) |
| +8 | 稏 稐 稑 稒 稓 稔 稕 稖 (=䎧 -> 耒) 稗 稘 (=萁 -> 艸) 稙 稚 稛 稜 稝 稞 稟 稠 稡 稢 稣^{SC} (=穌) 稤 稥 |
| +9 | 稦 稧 稨 稩 稪 稫 稬 (=糯 -> 米) 稭 (=秸) 種 稯 稰 稱 稲^{JP} (=稻) 稳^{SC} (=穩) 穊 |
| +10 | 稴 稵 稶 稷 稸 (=蓄 -> 艸) 稹 稺 (=稚) 稻 稼 稽 稾 (=稿) 稿 穀 穁 穂^{JP} (=穗) 穃 |
| +11 | 穄 穅 (=糠 -> 米) 穆 穇 穈 穋 穌 積 穎 穏^{JP} (=穩) 穐 (=秋) 穑^{SC} (=穡) 穒 |
| +12 | 穉 (=稚) 穓 穔 穕 穖 穗 穘 穙 穚 穛 穜 (=種) 穝 穞^{SC} (=穭) |
| +13 | 穟 穠 穡 穢 穣^{JP} (=穰) |
| +14 | 穤 (=糯 -> 米) 穥 穦 穧 穨 (=頹 -> 頁) 穩 穪 (=稱 苾 -> 艸) 穫 |
| +15 | 穬 穭 穮 穯 |
| +17 | 穰 穳 |
| +18 | 穱 |
| +19 | 穲 |

== Literature ==
- Fazzioli, Edoardo (1987). Chinese calligraphy : from pictograph to ideogram : the history of 214 essential Chinese/Japanese characters. calligraphy by Rebecca Hon Ko. New York: Abbeville Press. ISBN 0-89659-774-1.
- Lunde, Ken (Jan 5, 2009). "Appendix J: Japanese Character Sets" (PDF). CJKV Information Processing: Chinese, Japanese, Korean & Vietnamese Computing (Second ed.). Sebastopol, Calif.: O'Reilly Media. ISBN 978-0-596-51447-1.
