= Radical 145 =

Chinese character radical

衣
- Radical 145 (U+2F90)
- 衣 (U+8863) "clothes"

Pronunciations
- Pinyin: yī
- Bopomofo: ㄧ
- Wade–Giles: i1
- Cantonese Yale: yi1
- Jyutping: ji1, ji3
- Japanese Kana: イ i / エ e (on'yomi) ころも koromo (kun'yomi)
- Sino-Korean: 의 ui

Names
- Chinese name(s): (Left) 衣字旁 yīzìpáng (Bottom) 衣字底 yīzìdǐ
- Japanese name(s): 衣/ころも koromo (Left) 衣偏/ころもへん koromohen
- Hangul: 옷 ot

Stroke order animation

Stroke order of the component form 衤

Radical 145 or radical clothes (衣部) meaning "clothes" is one of the 29 Kangxi radicals (214 radicals in total) composed of 6 strokes. The radical character transforms into 衤 when appearing at the left side of a Chinese character.

In the Kangxi Dictionary, there are 607 characters (out of 49,030) to be found under this radical.

衣 is also the 142nd indexing component in the Table of Indexing Chinese Character Components predominantly adopted by Simplified Chinese dictionaries published in mainland China, with 衤 as its associated indexing component.

== Evolution ==
Oracle bone script character

Bronze script character

Chu slip and silk script

Qin slip script

Large seal script character

Small seal script character

== Derived characters ==
Strokes	Characters
+0	衣 衤
+2	初 补^{SC} (=補)
+3	衦 衧 表 衩 衪 (=袘) 衫 衬^{SC} (=襯)
+4	衭 衮^{SC} (=袞) 衯 衰 衱 衲 衳 衴 衵 衶 衷 衸 衹 衺 (=邪 -> 邑 斜 -> 斗) 衻 衼 衽 衾 衿 袀 袁 袂 袃 袄^{SC} (=襖) 袅^{SC} (=裊) 袆^{SC} (=褘) 袇
+5	袈 袉 袊 袋 袌 袍 袎 袏 袐 袑 袒 袓 袔 袕 袖 袗 袘 袙 袚 袛 袜^{SC} (=襪) 袝 袞 袟 袠 (=帙 -> 巾 / 秩 -> 禾) 袡 袢 袣 袤 袥 袦 袧 袨 袩 袪 被 袬 袭^{SC} (=襲) 袮 袰
+6	袯^{SC} (=襏) 袱 袲 袳 袴 (=褲 / 胯 -> 肉) 袵 (=衽) 袶 袷 袸 袹 袺 袻 袼 袽 袾 袿 裀 裁 裂 裃 裄 装^{SC} (=裝) 裆^{SC} (=襠) 裇 裈^{SC} (=褌) 裉
+7	裊 裋 裌 裍 裎 裏 裐 裑 裒 裓 裔 裕 裖 裗 裘 裙 裚 裛 補 裝 裞 裟 裠 (=裙) 裡 (=裏) 裢^{SC} (=褳) 裣^{SC} (=襝) 裤^{SC} (=褲) 裥^{SC} (=襇)
+8	裧 裨 裩 裪 裫 裬 裭 裮 裯 裰 裱 裲 裳 裴 裵 (=裴) 裶 裷 裸 裹 裺 裻 裼 製 裾 裿 褀 褁 褂 褃 褄
+9	裦 褅 褆 複 褈 褉 褊 褋 褌 褍 褎 褏 (=袖) 褐 褑 褒 褓 褔 褕 褖 褗 褘 褙 褚 褛^{SC} (=褸) 褜 褝 (=襌)
+10	褞 褟 褠 褡 褢 褣 褤 褥 褦 褧 褨 褩 褪 褫 褬 褭 褮 褯 褰 褱 褲 褴^{SC} (=襤)
+11	褳 褵 褶 褷 褸 褹 褺 褻 褼 褽 褾 褿 襀 襁 襂 襃 (=褒) 襄 襅 襔
+12	襆 襇 襈 襉 襊 襋 襌 襍 (=雜 -> 隹) 襎 襏 襐 襑 襒 襓 襕^{SC} (=襴)
+13	襖 襗 襘 襙 襚 襛 襜 襝 襞 襟 襠 襡 襢
+14	襣 襤 襥 襦 襧 襨
+15	襩 襪 襫 襬 襭 襮
+16	襯 襰 襱 襲
+17	囊 襳 襴 襽
+18	襵 襶 襷
+19	襸 襹 襺 襻 襼

== Sinogram ==
As an independent sinogram it is one of the kyōiku kanji or kanji taught in elementary school in Japan. It is a fourth grade kanji.

== Literature ==
- Fazzioli, Edoardo (1987). Chinese calligraphy : from pictograph to ideogram : the history of 214 essential Chinese/Japanese characters. calligraphy by Rebecca Hon Ko. New York: Abbeville Press. ISBN 0-89659-774-1.
