= Standard Form of National Characters =

Chinese character standard in Taiwan

The Standard Form of National Characters or the Standard Typefaces for Chinese Characters (Chinese: 國字標準字體; pinyin: Guózì Biāozhǔn Zìtǐ; Zhuyin Fuhao: ㄍㄨㄛˊ ㄗˋ ㄅㄧㄠ ㄓㄨㄣˇ ㄗˋ ㄊㄧˇ) is the standardized form of Chinese characters set by the Ministry of Education of the Republic of China (Taiwan).

== History ==
There are multiple versions of the standard, the first one released on 1982 and the second version on 1994. The standard is referenced by CNS 11643 which standardise new characters based on the orthography in standard, and an amendment was made to the orthography in CNS 11643 in 2024.

== Lists ==
There are three charts of the Standard Form of National Characters as defined in 1982, promulgated by Taiwan's Ministry of Education:

- Chart of Standard Forms of Common National Characters (Chinese: 常用國字標準字體表), including 4,808 commonly used Chinese characters.
- Chart of Standard Forms of Less-Than-Common National Characters (Chinese: 次常用國字標準字體表), including secondary commonly used 6,329 characters.
- Chart of Rarely-Used National Characters (Chinese: 罕用國字標準字體表), including 18,319 rarely used characters.

There are two reference glyph tables of the Standard Form of National Characters as provided in 1994, promulgated by Taiwan's Ministry of Education. This version is slightly different with the version in 1982.

- Kai Master Draft of Standard Form of National Characters (Chinese: 國字標準字體楷體母稿), for Regular script.
- Ming Master Draft of Standard Form of National Characters (Chinese: 國字標準字體宋體母稿), for Ming typeface.

== Characteristics ==
Note: Viewing this section correctly requires certain standard typefaces to be installed and the browser to be configured to use them in appropriate contexts.

The Standard Form of National Characters tends to adopt traditional orthodox variants for most of its characters, but it still adopts many common vulgar variants. Many have their components rearranged. For example:

- 群 The orthodox form of this character has 君 above 羊, i.e. 羣.
- 峰 The orthodox form of this character has 山 above 夆, i.e. 峯.
- 裡 The orthodox form of this character has 里 inside 衣, i.e. 裏.

Other vulgar variants which are extremely common in handwriting have been adopted. For example:

- 為 The orthodox form of this character is 爲 with the second and fourth strokes pointing out.
- 令 The orthodox form of this character has 亼 above 卩, i.e. 令.

Some forms which were standardized have never been used or are extremely rare. For example:

- 寺 Before this standard was created, the second horizontal stroke was almost always the longest, i.e. 寺.
- 有青能 Whenever there is a component resembling ⺼ or 月 placed at the bottom, most standards write the first stroke as a vertical stroke, e.g. the mainland Chinese standard writes these characters as 有青能.

Some components are differentiated where most other standards do not differentiate. For example:

- 朠脈 The component on the left in 朠 is 月 (meaning "moon"), while the component on the left in 脈 is ⺼ (a form of 肉, meaning "meat"). They are differentiated in that 月 has two horizontal strokes, where ⺼ has a dot and an upward-horizontal stroke resembling 冫.
- 草夢 The component at the top of 草 is 艹, while the component at the top of 夢 is 卝. They are differentiated in that the horizontal strokes of 卝 do not pass through the vertical strokes.
- 次冰 The component on the left in 次 is 二, while the component on the left in 冰 is 冫.
- 冬致瓊 The component on the top in 冬 is 夂, the component on the right in 致 is 夊, and the component on the bottom right of 瓊 is 攵.

This standard tends to follow a rule of writing regular script where there should be no more than one of ㇏ (called 捺), long horizontal stroke, or hook to the right (e.g. ㇂ ㇃) in a character.

- 樂業央 The first horizontal strokes in these characters are long horizontal strokes. Therefore, long dots are used in place of a regular right falling stroke ㇏ as their last strokes. Other standards use ㇏ as the last stroke, e.g. mainland China (樂業央) and Japan (樂業央).
- 七 This character has a long horizontal stroke, so it cannot have a hook to the right. Other standards do not follow this rule as closely, e.g. mainland China (七) and Japan (七).

== Usage ==
Currently the ROC government does not enforce the use of Standard Form of National Characters for fonts produced by font foundries, and most fonts currently selling in the market does not obey the standard form. There were also multiple versions of the Standard Form of National Characters, which font foundries that claim to be following the standard might not be using the latest version. Schools in Taiwan are expected to teach the Standard Form of National Characters.

Fonts on older operating systems such as MingLiU on Windows XP and Heiti TC on Mac OS X Panther does not follow the standard, instead opting for the region-agnostic jiu zixing forms. However current operating systems have updated new UI fonts which generally follows the standard form such as MingLiU and Microsoft JhengHei on Windows 10, Noto Sans CJK/Source Han from Google/Adobe and Pingfang TC on Mac OS. This has caused increased usage in current times as more users will use the default fonts provided by the operating system with no choices to change the UI font.

Hong Kong does not use the Standard Form of National Characters, instead generally used either jiu zixing, Monotype Traditional Chinese fonts or DynaComware LiSong font; schools will educate on the List of Graphemes of Commonly-Used Chinese Characters and allow other orthography variants specified in the list. However due to widespread usage of new operating system that uses the Standard Form of National Characters which is only specific to ROC education use only, this has caused Hongkongers to reject the Standard Form of National Characters, and teachers will teach student these are "computer character" and are incorrect.

== Objections ==
Standard Form of National Characters claimed to follow traditional orthography and etymology of the Chinese characters. However, the standard is heavily criticized by the general public due to extremely strict rules and requirements, incorrect etymologies and closed-door standardisation process.

=== Strict rules and requirements ===
The standard stipulated multiple requirements on glyph design that violates either traditional printing orthographies or calligraphy practices. For example, general rule 36 prescribe horizontal strokes wrapped inside (e.g. 日, 田 and 月) must touch both left and right side, however in calligraphy the strokes usually does not touch the right side (and sometimes left side).

Arphic Technology mentioned that when MingLiU was changed from jiu zixing to Standard Form of National Characters, it has "lost the beauty of printing orthography that was in the original Japanese Shaken font design, became an unbalanced handwritten typeface, which is rejected by the printing industry". The company CEO mentioned in regards to the standard that "if you simply define what printed fonts should look like by handwriting techniques, the characters will be crooked and the reading experience will be very poor" when interviewed about justfont and its glyph shapes that does not follow the standard, which shows that the standard is not fit for printing typefaces such as heiti (sans-serif) and mingti (serif).

Team members of justfont mentioned that Standard Form of National Characters is only suitable for education. For the comfort and beauty of reading, the printing orthography standard should still be used. Standard Form of National Characters harms the visual balance and aesthetics when applied to printing typefaces, as seen in fonts like MingLiU on Windows 10..

=== Etymology ===
Various characters that had better etymology in jiu zixing has been forcibly changed to follow vulgar forms or based on incorrect etymology studies. For example, traditional orthography of 靑 (bottom is 円 or 丹), 爲 (top with 爪 signifying using hand to do things), 朕 (left is 舟月 with two dots inside, not horizontal), ⺬ (the standard uses 礻), 讀 (right side is 𧶠), 者 (with extra dot), 言 (first stroke is horizontal) all have closer relations to the original forms shown in Seal script and traditional dictionaries such as Kangxi dictionary and Zhonghua Da Zidian.

=== Standardisation process ===
The authorities’ attitude in creating and enforcing the standard is also questioned. Scholars, calligraphers, and industry professionals argue that the standards were developed in a closed, top-down manner without sufficient public or cross-disciplinary oversight. Critics say officials have been unwilling to revise the standards despite widespread feedback, sometimes justifying this rigidity by citing government approval or technical constraints, as said by a government official to a public member: "the standard has been entered into computer and cannot be modified" and later "the standard has been enforced and cannot be modified". Prominent voices, including calligraphers and font designers, contend that the process ignored practical concerns such as readability, printing feasibility, and artistic tradition, leading to a lack of consensus and ongoing dissatisfaction across multiple fields.
