= Traditional Chinese characters =

Standardized set of Chinese characters

Traditional Chinese
- Script type: Logographic
- Published: Taiwan: ( 1979; 1982 ); Hong Kong: (1986)
- Period: 2nd century-present
- Direction: Left-to-right; Top-to-bottom, columns right to left
- Official script: Taiwan; Hong Kong; Macau
- Languages: Chinese languages

Related scripts
- Parent systems: Oracle bone script: Small seal script; Clerical script; Regular script; Traditional Chinese
- Sister systems: Simplified characters; Kanji; Hanja; Chữ Nôm; Bopomofo; Khitan large script; Khitan small script; Sawndip

ISO 15924
- ISO 15924: Hant (502), Han (Traditional variant)

Unicode
- Unicode range: Not in Unicode

Chinese name
- Traditional Chinese: 正體字
- Simplified Chinese: 正体字
- Literal meaning: Orthodox form characters
Transcriptions
Standard Mandarin
- Hanyu Pinyin: Zhèngtǐzì
- Bopomofo: ㄓㄥˋ ㄊㄧˇ ㄗˋ
- Wade–Giles: Chêng^{4}-tʻi^{3}-tzŭ^{4}
- Tongyong Pinyin: Jhèng-tǐ-zìh
- IPA: [ʈʂə̂ŋ.tʰì.tsɹ̩̂]
Yue: Cantonese
- Yale Romanization: Jing tái jih
- Jyutping: zing3 tai2 zi6
- IPA: [tsɪŋ˧.tʰɐj˧˥.tsi˨]

Alternative Chinese name
- Traditional Chinese: 繁體字
- Simplified Chinese: 繁体字
- Literal meaning: Complex form characters
Transcriptions
Standard Mandarin
- Hanyu Pinyin: Fántǐzì
- Bopomofo: ㄈㄢˊ ㄊㄧˇ ㄗˋ
- Wade–Giles: Fan^{2}-tʻi^{3}-tzŭ^{4}
- Tongyong Pinyin: Fán-tǐ-zìh
- IPA: [fǎn.tʰì.tsɹ̩̂]
Yue: Cantonese
- Yale Romanization: Fàahn tái jih
- Jyutping: faan4 tai2 zi6
- IPA: [fan˩ tʰɐj˧˥ tsi˨]

Traditional Chinese characters are one of two standardized character sets used to write the Chinese language, with the other being simplified characters. Traditional characters predominated in written Chinese, the historical lingua franca of East Asia, until the mid-20th century. Today, they are used in Taiwan, Hong Kong, and Macau, as well as in most overseas Chinese communities outside of Southeast Asia.

In the mid-20th century, People's Republic of China (PRC) began standardizing simplified Chinese, mostly with characters that existed before as variants, sometimes merging previously distinct character forms. "Traditional" as such is a retronym applied to non-simplified character. As for non-Chinese languages using Chinese characters, Japanese kanji include many simplified characters known as shinjitai standardized after World War II, sometimes distinct from their simplified Chinese counterparts. Korean hanja remain virtually identical to traditional Chinese characters. Despite the debates on traditional and simplified Chinese, the two scripts are mutually intelligible to most native speakers, and many Chinese-language platforms allow users to switch between them.

== Terminology ==
Traditional characters are known by different names throughout the Chinese-speaking world. The most widely used name is 繁體字; 繁体字; fántǐzì; 'complex characters'. The government of Taiwan officially refers to them as 正體字; 正体字; zhèngtǐzì; 'orthodox characters'. This term is sometimes used outside Taiwan to distinguish standard characters, including both simplified, and traditional, from other variants and idiomatic characters. Traditional characters are also known as 老字; lǎozì; 'old characters', or 全體字; 全体字; quántǐzì; 'full characters' to distinguish them from simplified characters.

Some argue that since traditional characters are often the original standard forms, they should not be called "complex". Conversely, there is a common objection to the description of traditional characters as "standard", due to their not being used by a large population of Chinese speakers. Additionally, as the process of Chinese character creation often made many characters more elaborate over time, there is sometimes a hesitation to characterize them as "traditional".

== Use by region ==
The modern shapes of traditional Chinese characters first appeared with the emergence of the clerical script during the Han dynasty c. 200 BCE, with the sets of forms and norms more or less stable since the Southern and Northern dynasties period c. the 5th century.

=== Mainland China ===
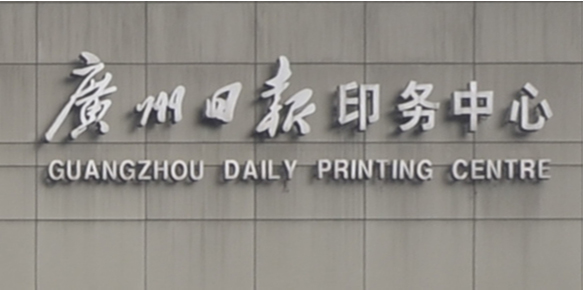
The Guangzhou Daily, one of China's best-read newspapers, uses traditional Chinese characters in its branding.

Under the PRC's Law of Standard Spoken and Written Chinese Language, which came into effect on 1 January 2026, traditional characters and variant characters may be used in the following circumstances:

1. cultural relics and historic sites
2. variant characters in personal names
3. works of art such as calligraphy and seal engraving
4. handwritten inscriptions and signboards
5. publishing, teaching, and research where their use is needed
6. special circumstances approved by the relevant departments of the State Council

The nameplates and logos of many major institutions in China are written in traditional characters, such as those of the People's Daily, Tsinghua University, Bank of China, Air China, and Sinopec. Chinese leaders from Mao Zedong to Xi Jinping tend to sign their names and inscribe calligraphic dedications using, fully or partially, traditional Chinese. A notable critic of character simplification was the renowned historian Chen Yinke, whose works continued to be published in traditional characters in mainland China, in accordance with his wishes, long after the promulgation of simplified characters. His works were not published in simplified Chinese until 2020, when his copyright expired, fifty years after his death. Qian Zhongshu also maintained that some of his scholarly works be published in traditional Chinese. He preferred the traditional form of zhong in his name, 鍾, which had been merged with 鐘 into the simplified character 钟. As a result, both forms of zhong have been used by publishers and media (He had no issue with the simplified qian and shu, as they were not merged with characters of distinct meaning). 锺 was restored as a standard simplified character in 2013 (maintaining the simplified radical while restoring the phonetic element).

In mainland China, traditional Chinese characters are standardized according to the Table of Comparison between Standard, Traditional and Variant Chinese Characters. Dictionaries published in mainland China generally show both simplified and their traditional counterparts. There are small differences between the accepted traditional forms in mainland China and elsewhere, for example the accepted traditional form of 产 in mainland China is 産 (also the accepted form in Japan and Korea), while in Hong Kong, Macau and Taiwan the accepted form is 產 (also the accepted form in Vietnamese chữ Nôm).

=== Hong Kong and Macau ===
In Hong Kong and Macau, traditional characters were retained during the colonial period. However, the growing use of simplified characters, often to accommodate immigrants and tourists from mainland China, has prompted concerns among some locals about the preservation of what they see as the cultural heritage. In Hong Kong, the set of traditional characters is prescribed in the List of Graphemes of Commonly-Used Chinese Characters by the Hong Kong Education Bureau.

=== Taiwan ===
Although the Republic of China (ROC) government attempted to promote its own simplified-character schemes in mainland China and Taiwan in the 1930s and 1950s, respectively, both efforts failed. In 1956, following the PRC's announcement of a character simplification program, the ROC government abandoned its own plans and did not pursue further simplification efforts. Despite official discouragement, the use of simplified characters has gained traction in everyday life. Notably, "Taiwan" is much more often today to be written in simplified forms 台灣 or 台湾 rather than the orthodox 臺灣. Political leaders such as Tsai Ing-wen, Su Tseng-chang, and Lai Ching-te have also been known to use simplified characters in personal handwriting, although some of these forms are long-established variants and do not necessarily correspond to the simplified script prescribed in mainland China.

In Taiwan, the set of traditional characters is regulated by the Ministry of Education and standardized in the Standard Form of National Characters.

=== Singapore ===
Traditional characters were recognized as the official script in Singapore until 1969, when the government adopted simplified characters. Beyond official and educational contexts, traditional characters continue to be used in everyday and commercial settings.

=== Philippines ===
Although major public universities teach in simplified characters, many well-established Chinese schools still use traditional characters. Publications such as the Chinese Commercial News, World News, and United Daily News all use traditional characters. The Philippine Chinese Daily uses simplified characters.

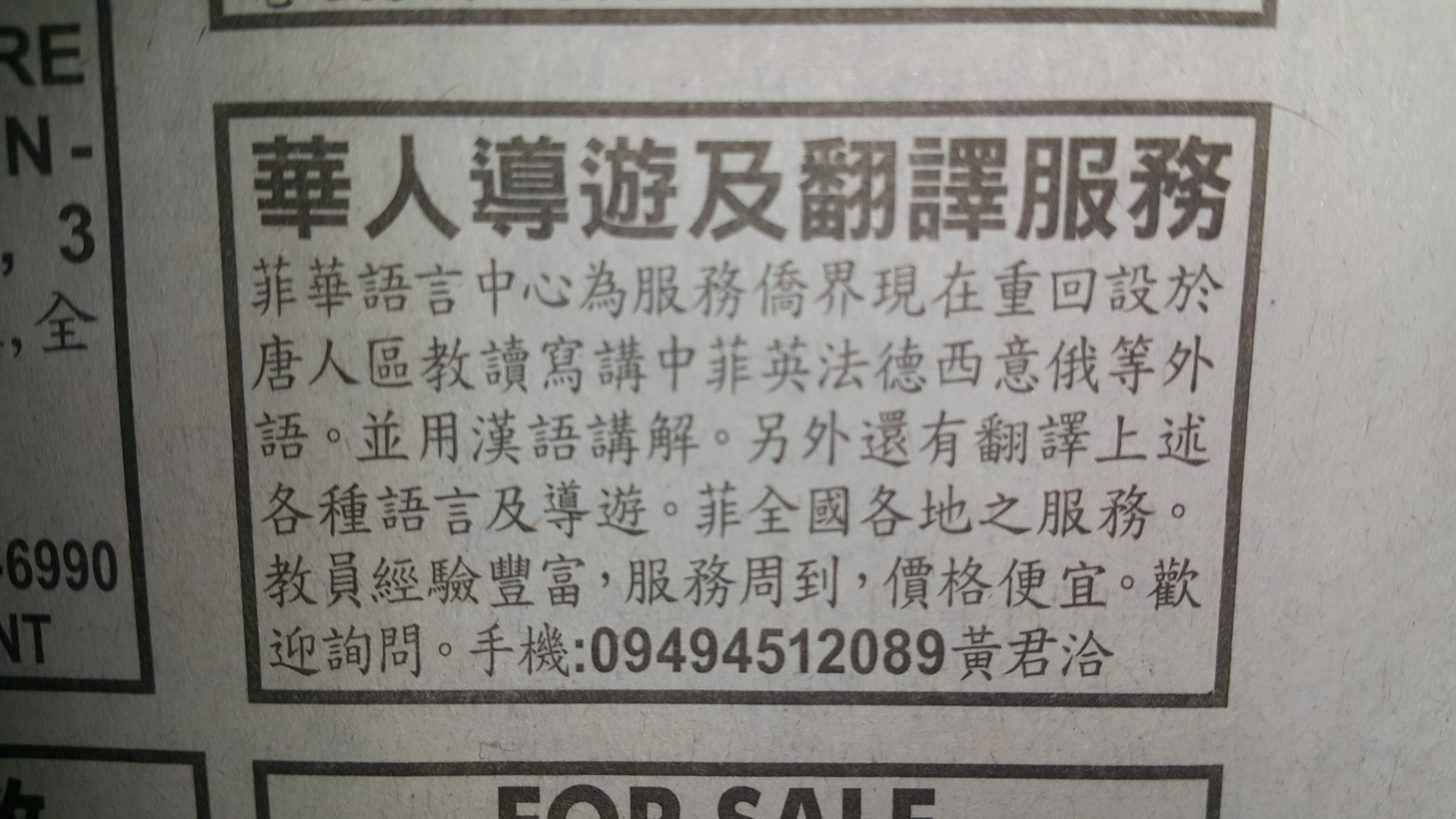
Advertisement in a Filipino Chinese daily newspaper written in traditional Chinese characters

=== North America ===
Because most Chinese immigrants arrived in the United States before the widespread adoption of simplified Chinese in the late 20th century, traditional characters have remained prevalent in Chinese American communities, including in Chinatowns and Chinese-language newspapers. When only one script is used, Chinese-language public notices and signs issued by the United States government have traditionally been more likely to appear in traditional characters. The use of simplified characters has increased in the 21st century with the growing presence of immigrants from mainland China and expanding exchanges with the People's Republic of China. Today, most modern Chinese courses at American schools and universities teach simplified characters only.

== Use on computers ==
=== Encoding ===
In the past, traditional Chinese was most often encoded on computers using the Big5 standard, which favored traditional characters. However, the ubiquitous Unicode standard gives equal weight to simplified and traditional Chinese characters, and has become by far the most popular encoding for Chinese-language text.

=== Input methods ===
There are various input method editors (IMEs) available for the input of Chinese characters. Many characters, often dialectical variants, are encoded in Unicode but cannot be inputted using certain IMEs, with one example being the Shanghainese-language character U+20C8E 𠲎 CJK UNIFIED IDEOGRAPH-20C8E—a composition of 伐 with the ⼝ 'MOUTH' radical—used instead of the Standard Chinese 嗎; 吗.

=== Typefaces ===
Typefaces often use the initialism TC to signify the use of traditional Chinese characters, as well as SC for simplified Chinese characters. In addition, the Noto family of typefaces, for example, also provides separate fonts for the traditional character set used in Taiwan (TC) and the set used in Hong Kong (HK).

=== Webpages ===
Most Chinese-language webpages now use Unicode for their text. The World Wide Web Consortium (W3C) recommends the use of the language tag zh-Hant to specify webpage content written with traditional characters. ISO 15924 offers Hant to mark text in traditional Chinese and Hntl for text mixing traditional Chinese and Latin characters, sometimes used for Taiwanese Hokkien.

== Comparison with other scripts ==
In the Japanese writing system, kyujitai are traditional forms, which were simplified to create shinjitai for standardized Japanese use following World War II. Kyūjitai are mostly congruent with the traditional characters in Chinese, save for minor stylistic variation. Characters that are not included in the jōyō kanji list are generally recommended to be printed in their traditional forms, with a few exceptions. Additionally, there are kokuji, which are kanji wholly created in Japan, rather than originally being borrowed from China.

In the Korean writing system, hanja—replaced almost entirely by hangul in South Korea and totally replaced in North Korea—are mostly identical with their traditional counterparts, save minor stylistic variations. As with Japanese, there are autochthonous hanja, known as gukja.

Traditional Chinese characters are also used by non-Chinese ethnic groups. The Maniq people living in Thailand and Malaysia use Chinese characters to write the Kensiu language.

== See also ==
- Modern Chinese characters
- Chữ Nôm
- Ambiguities in Chinese character simplification
