= List of Graphemes of Commonly-Used Chinese Characters =

The List of Graphemes of Commonly-Used Chinese Characters (Chinese: 常用字字形表; Jyutping: soeng4 jung6 zi6 zi6 jing4 biu2) is a list of 4762 commonly used Chinese characters and their standardized forms prescribed by the Hong Kong Education Bureau. The list is meant to be taught in primary and middle schools in Hong Kong, but does not place restrictions on typefaces used for printing such as Ming, gothic, or rounded gothic typeface styles.

== History ==
Research and compilation work on the list began in July 1984. The work was undertaken by Professor Lei Hok-ming (李學銘) of the Department of Chinese of the Education Bureau Institute of Language in Education (ILE) (語文教育學院) and other scholars within the department. A Committee for the Research of Commonly-Used Chinese Character Graphemes, composed of scholars from various academic institutions, also participated in the examination and approval process for each character. The list was completed in September 1985 and published in September 1986.

The list was revised more thoroughly upon republications in 1990, 1997, and 2000. The 1990 revision was undertaken by three professors in the Chinese department of the ILE. In 2000, the ILE had become a part of the Education University of Hong Kong, so the editing process was undertaken by three professors (Ze Gaa-hou 謝家浩, Lou Hing-kiu 盧興翹, and Sitou Sau-mei 司徒秀薇) of the Education University, along with Lei Hok-ming, who was at Hong Kong Polytechnic University at the time.

The list was last updated in 2007, included as an appendix to the Hong Kong Chinese Lexical Lists for Primary Learning (Chinese: 香港小學學習字詞表; Jyutping: Hoeng1gong2 siu2hok6 hok6zaap6 zi6ci4 biu2).

In 2012, the list was published as a hardcover book, with Cantonese and Mandarin pronunciations and simple English explanations for every character.
