= Radical 38 =

Chinese character radical

女
- Radical 38 (U+2F25)
- 女 (U+5973) "woman, female"

Pronunciations
- Pinyin: nǚ
- Bopomofo: ㄋㄩˇ
- Gwoyeu Romatzyh: neu
- Wade–Giles: nü^{3}
- Cantonese Yale: néuih
- Jyutping: neoi5
- Pe̍h-ōe-jī: lú
- Japanese Kana: ジョ jo (on'yomi) おんな onna (kun'yomi)
- Sino-Korean: 녀 (여) nyeo

Names
- Chinese name(s): (Left) 女字旁 nǚzìpáng (Bottom) 女字底 nǚzìdǐ
- Japanese name(s): 女偏/おんなへん onnahen
- Hangul: 계집 gyejip

Stroke order animation

Radical 38 or radical woman (女部) meaning "woman" or "female" is one of the 31 Kangxi radicals (214 radicals total) composed of three strokes.

In the Kangxi Dictionary, there are 681 characters (out of 49,030) to be found under this radical.

女 is also the 56th indexing component in the Table of Indexing Chinese Character Components predominantly adopted by Simplified Chinese dictionaries published in mainland China.

== Evolution ==
Compare 卩, 旡 and 母.

Oracle bone script character

Bronze script character

Chu slip and silk script

Qin slip script

Large seal script character

Small seal script character

== Derived characters ==
Strokes	Characters
+0	女
+2	奴 奵 奶
+3	奷 奸 (also SC form of 姦) 她 奺 奻 奼 好 奾 奿 妀 妁 如 妃 妄 妅 妆^{SC} (=妝) 妇^{SC} (=婦) 妈^{SC} (=媽)
+4	妉 妊 妋 妌 妎 妏 妐 妑 妒 妓 妔 妕 妖 妗 妘 妙 妚 妛^{JP} (variant form of 媸 in Chinese) 妜 妝 妞 妟 妠 妡 妢 妣 妤 妥 妦 妧 妨 妩^{SC} (=嫵) 妪^{SC} (=嫗) 妫^{SC} (=媯)
+5	妬^{JP} (=妒) 妭 妮 妯 妰 妱 妲 妳 妴 妵 妶 妷 (=姪 / 逸 -> 辵) 妸 (=婀) 妹 妺 妻 妼 妽 妾 妿 姀 姁 姂 姃 姄 姅 姆 姇 姈 姉^{JP} (=姊) 姊 始 姌 姍 姎 姏 姐 姑 姒 姓 委 姕 姖 姗^{SC} (=姍)
+6	妍 姘 姙 (=妊) 姚 姛 姜 姝 姞 姟 姠 姡 姢 (=娟) 姣 姤 姥 姦 姧 (=姦) 姨 姩 姪 姫 (also JP form of 姬) 姭 姮 姯 姰 姱 姲 姳 姴 姵 姶 姷 姸 (=妍) 姹^{SC} (=奼) 姺 姻 姼 姽 姾 姿 娀 威 娂 娃 娅^{SC} (=婭) 娆^{SC} (=嬈) 娇^{SC} (=嬌) 娈^{SC} (=孌)
+7	姬 娉 娊 娋 娌 娍 娎 娏 娐 娑 娒 娓 娔 娕 娖 娗 娘 娙 娚 (=嫐 / 喃 -> 口 / 甥 -> 生) 娛 娜 娝 娞 娟 娠 娡 娢 娣 娤 娥 娦 娧 娨 娩 娪 娫 娭 娮 娯^{JP} (=娛) 娰 娱^{SC} (=娛) 娲^{SC} (=媧) 娳 娴^{SC} (=嫻) 娽
+8	娬 娵 娶 娷 娸 娹 娺 娻 娼 娾 娿 (=婀) 婀 婁 婂 婃 婄 婅 婆 婇 婈 婉 婊 婋 婌 婍 婎 婏 (=嬎) 婐 婑 (=婐) 婒 婓 婔 (=婓) 婕 婖 婗 婘 (=眷 -> 目) 婙 (=婧) 婚 婛 婜 婝 婞 婟 婠 婡 婢 婣 (=姻) 婤 婥 婦 婧 婨 婩 婪 婫 婬 (=淫 -> 水) 婭 婮 婯 (=麗 -> 鹿) 婰 婱 婲 婳^{SC} (=嫿) 婴^{SC} (=嬰) 婵^{SC} (=嬋) 婶^{SC} (=嬸)
+9	婷 婸 婹 (=偠 -> 人) 婺 婻 婼 婽 婾 (=偷 -> 人 / 愉 -> 心) 婿 媀 媁 媂 媃 媄 (=美 -> 羊) 媅 媆 媇 (=親 -> 見) 媈 媉 媊 媋 媌 媍 (=婦) 媎 (=姐) 媏 媑 媒 媓 媔 媕 媖 媗 媘 媙 媚 媛 媜 媝 媞 媟 媠 媡 媢 媣 媤 媥 媦 媧 媨 媩 媪^{SC/HK} (=媼) 媫 (=婕) 媬 媭^{SC} (=嬃) 媮 (=偷 -> 人 / 愉 -> 心) 媯 嫏
+10	媐 媰 媱 媲 媳 媴 媵 媶 媷 媸 媹 媺 (=美 -> 羊) 媻 媼 媽 媾 媿 (=愧 -> 心) 嫀 (=姺) 嫁 嫂 嫃 嫄 嫅 嫆 嫇 嫈 嫉 嫊 嫋 (=裊 -> 衣) 嫌 嫍 嫎 嫐 嫑 嫒^{SC} (=嬡) 嫓 (=媲) 嫔^{SC} (=嬪)
+11	嫕 嫖 嫗 嫘 嫙 嫚 嫛 嫜 嫝 嫞 嫟 (=暱 -> 日) 嫠 嫡 嫢 嫣 嫤 嫥 嫦 嫧 嫨 (=戁 -> 心) 嫩 嫪 嫫 嫬 嫭 嫮 (=嫭) 嫯 嫰 (=嫩) 嫱^{SC} (=嬙) 嫲
+12	嫳 嫴 嫵 嫶 嫷 嫸 嫹 (=媌) 嫺 (=嫻) 嫻 嫼 嫽 嫾 嫿 嬀 (=媯) 嬁 嬂 嬃 嬄 嬅 嬆 嬇 嬈 嬉 嬊 嬋 嬌 嬍 (=美 -> 羊) 嬎 嬏
+13	嬐 嬑 嬒 嬓 嬔 嬕 嬖 嬗 嬘 嬙 嬚 嬛 嬜 嬝 (=裊 -> 衣) 嬞 嬟 嬠 嬡 嬢^{JP} (=孃) 嬴
+14	嬣 嬤 嬥 嬦 嬧 嬨 嬩 嬪 嬫 嬬 嬭 (=奶) 嬮 嬯 嬰 嬱 嬲 嬳 嬵 嬶 嬷^{SC} (=嬤)
+15	嬸 嬺 嬻 嬼 嬽
+16	嬹 嬾 (=懶 -> 心) 嬿
+17	孀 孁 孂 孃 孄 孅 孆 (=嬰)
+18	孇 孈 孉
+19	孊 孋 孌
+20	孍
+21	孎 孏 (=懶 -> 心)

== Controversies over sexism ==
Some feminists have claimed that many Chinese characters under radical woman are pejorative, 奴 (slave, literally a hand holding a woman), 妖 (demon), 妒 (JP: 妬, envy), 姦 (Simp.: 奸, rape, traitor), 嫌 (dislike) for example, and learning and using them may unconsciously lead to misogyny. Some have even proposed a reform of these characters.

In 2010, Ye Mantian (叶满天), a mainland Chinese male lawyer, posted an essay online in which he criticized 16 Chinese characters for their sexist implication. The 16 characters were 娱 (娛, entertainment), 耍 (to play with, usually classified under radical 126 而), 婪 (greedy), 嫉 (envy), 妒 (envy), 嫌 (dislike), 佞 (flattery), 妄 (presumptuous), 妖 (demon), 奴 (slave), 妓 (prostitute), 娼 (whore), 奸 (姦, rape, traitor), 姘 (extramarital sex), 婊 (bitch), and 嫖 (to visit prostitutes). He also proposed a reform of some characters, e.g. replace 奸 with a newly created Chinese character "犭行" (犭: dog, usually associated with monsters or uncivilized actions; 行: behaviors; the proposed character therefore implies rape is a monstrous behavior), believing that the change would reduce rape cases. Opponents argued that the new characters were historically unsound; that even if they were adopted, they would remain specious and would not effectively improve female's social status. They also pointed out that improvements in legal and social culture aspects were the actual remedy of sexism.

In 2015, an exhibition in Beijing entitled "姦: Cultural Codes of Gender Violence" (姦：性別暴力伤害的文化符号) organized by 65 artists was canceled by the authorities. Still, the idea of this exhibition made its way through international media outlets. Tong Yujie (佟玉洁), the exhibition's academic convener, questioned in her writing: "Why did one woman become three, and such a symbol of political and moral imagination and an object of enmity in traditional Chinese society and political theory?"

A 2014 study done by Wang Yuping from Anhui University's School of Chinese Language and Literature analyzed all Chinese characters with the woman radical in a concise edition of Hanyu Da Cidian (汉语大词典简编). The result shows that among these characters, there are 56 with negative meaning, 70 with positive meaning, and 184 are neutral. Nonetheless, the author believed that some of these categories suggested discrimination in traditional Chinese culture.

Similar controversies also exist in "gendered" European languages which have divisions between masculine and feminine terms. This phenomenon is called linguistic sexism.

== Sinogram ==
Alone the character is one of the Kyōiku kanji or Kanji taught in elementary school in Japan. It is a first grade kanji.

== Literature ==
- Fazzioli, Edoardo (1987). Chinese calligraphy : from pictograph to ideogram : the history of 214 essential Chinese/Japanese characters. calligraphy by Rebecca Hon Ko. New York: Abbeville Press. ISBN 0-89659-774-1.
- Lunde, Ken (Jan 5, 2009). "Appendix J: Japanese Character Sets" (PDF). CJKV Information Processing: Chinese, Japanese, Korean & Vietnamese Computing (Second ed.). Sebastopol, Calif.: O'Reilly Media. ISBN 978-0-596-51447-1.
