= Radical 46 =

Chinese character radical

山
- Radical 46 (U+2F2D)
- 山 (U+5C71) "mountain"

Pronunciations
- Pinyin: shān
- Bopomofo: ㄕㄢ
- Gwoyeu Romatzyh: shan
- Wade–Giles: shan^{1}
- Cantonese Yale: sāan
- Jyutping: saan1
- Pe̍h-ōe-jī: san
- Japanese Kana: サン san (on'yomi) やま yama (kun'yomi)
- Sino-Korean: 산 san

Names
- Chinese name(s): (Left) 山字旁 shānzìpáng (Top) 山字頭/山字头 shānzìtóu (Bottom) 山字底 shānzìdǐ
- Japanese name(s): 山/やま yama (Left) 山偏/やまへん yamahen (Top) 山冠/やまかんむり yamakanmuri
- Hangul: 메 me

Stroke order animation

Radical 46 or radical mountain (山部) meaning "mountain" is one of the 31 Kangxi radicals (214 radicals total) composed of three strokes. It is found in the names of mountains generally in east Asia.

In the Kangxi Dictionary, there are 636 characters (out of 49,030) to be found under this radical.

山 is also the 39th indexing component in the Table of Indexing Chinese Character Components predominantly adopted by Simplified Chinese dictionaries published in mainland China.

In Taoist cosmology, 山 (mountain) is the natural component of the bagua diagram 艮 gèn. This diagram corresponds to the I Ching trigram ☶.

== Evolution ==
Compare 火 and 丘. Top component of 出 and 岁 is from 止 ("foot"). Unrelated to 屮.

Oracle bone script character

Bronze script character

Chu slip and silk script

Large seal script character

Small seal script character

== Derived characters ==
| Strokes | Characters |
|---|---|
| +0 | 山 |
| +1 | 乢 (=蓋 -> 艸) 屲 |
| +2 | 屳 屴 屵 屶^{JP} (also obsolete variant form of 會 -> 曰) 屷 (=會 -> 曰) |
| +3 | 屸 屹 屺 屻 屼 屽 屾 屿^{SC} (=嶼) 岀 (=出 -> 凵) 岁^{SC} (=歲) 岂^{SC} (=豈) 岃 |
| +4 | 岄 岅 (=阪 -> 阜) 岆 岇 岈 岉 岊 岋 岌 岎 岏 岐 岑 岒 岓 岔 岕 岖^{SC} (=嶇) 岗^{SC} (=崗) 岘^{SC} (=峴) 岙^{SC} (=嶴) 岚^{SC} (=嵐) 岛^{SC} (=島) 岜 |
| +5 | 岝 岞 岟 岠 岡 岢 岣 岤 岥 岦 岧 岨 岩 岪 岫 岬 岭^{SC} (=嶺) 岮 岯 岰 岱 岲 岳 岴 (=嶇) 岵 岶 岷 岸 岹 (=岧) 岺 岻 岼 岽^{SC} (=崬) 岾 岿^{SC} (=巋) 峀 峁 峂 峃^{SC} (=嶨) 峄^{SC} (=嶧) 峅^{JP} |
| +6 | 岍 峆 峇 峈 峉 峊 峋 峌 峍 峎 峏 峐 峑 峒 峓 峔 峕 (=時 -> 日) 峖 峗 峘 峙 峚 峛 峜 峝 (=峒) 峞 峟 峠^{JP} 峡^{SC/JP} (=峽) 峢 (=峛) 峣^{SC} (=嶢) 峤^{SC} (=嶠) 峥^{SC} (=崢) 峦^{SC} (=巒) 峧 |
| +7 | 峨 峩 (=峨) 峪 峫 峬 峭 峮 峯^{HK variant} (=峰) 峰 峱 峲 峳 峴 峵 島 峷 峸 峹 峺 峻 峼 峽 峾 峿 崀 崁 崂^{SC} (=嶗) 崃^{SC} (=崍) 崄^{SC} (=嶮) 崅 |
| +8 | 崆 崇 崈 (=崇) 崉 崊 崋 崌 崍 崎 崏 崐 (=崑) 崑 崒 崓 崔 崕 (=崖) 崖 崗 崘 (=崙) 崙 崚 崛 崜 崝 崞 崟 崠 崡 崢 崣 崤 崥 崦 崧 崨 崩 崪 崫 崬 崭^{SC} (=嶄) 崮 崯 崰 |
| +9 | 崱 崲 崳 崴 崵 崶 崷 崸 崹 崺 崻 (=峙) 崼 崽 崾 崿 嵀 嵁 嵂 嵃 嵄 嵅 嵆 嵇 嵈 嵉 嵋 嵌 嵍 嵎 嵏 嵐 嵑 嵒 (=岩) 嵓 (=岩) 嵔 嵕 嵖 嵗 (=歲 -> 止) 嵘^{SC} (=嶸) 嵙 嵚^{SC} (=嶔) 嵛 嵜 (=崎) 嵝^{SC} (=嶁) |
| +10 | 嵊 嵞 嵟 嵠 嵡 嵢 嵣 嵤 嵥 嵦 嵧 嵨 嵩 嵪 嵫 嵬 嵭 嵮 嵯 嵰 嵱 嵲 嵳 嵴 嵵 嵶 |
| +11 | 嵷 嵸 嵹 嵺 嵻 嵼 嵽 嵾 嵿 嶀 嶁 嶂 嶃 (=嶄) 嶄 嶅 嶆 嶇 嶈 嶉 嶊 嶋 (=島) 嶌 (=島) 嶍 嶎 |
| +12 | 嶏 嶐 嶑 嶒 嶓 嶔 嶕 嶖 嶗 嶘 嶙 嶚 (=嶛) 嶛 嶜 嶝 嶞 嶟 嶠 嶡 嶢 嶣 嶤 嶥 |
| +13 | 嶦 嶧 嶨 嶩 (=峱) 嶪 嶫 嶬 嶭 嶮 嶯 嶰 嶱 嶲 嶳 嶴 嶵 嶶 |
| +14 | 嶷 嶸 嶹 嶺 嶼 嶽 嶾 嶿 |
| +15 | 巀 巁 巂 |
| +16 | 嶻 巃 巄 (=巃) 巅^{SC} (=巔) |
| +17 | 巆 巇 巈 巉 巊 巋 巌^{JP} (=巖) |
| +18 | 巍 巏 巐 |
| +19 | 巎 巑 巒 巓 (=巔) 巔 巕 巗 (=巖) |
| +20 | 巖 巘 巙 巚 (=巘) |

== Sinogram ==
The radical is also used as an independent Chinese character. It is one of the kyōiku kanji or kanji taught in elementary school in Japan. It is a first grade kanji.

== Literature ==
- Fazzioli, Edoardo (1987). Chinese calligraphy : from pictograph to ideogram : the history of 214 essential Chinese/Japanese characters. calligraphy by Rebecca Hon Ko. New York: Abbeville Press. ISBN 0-89659-774-1.
- Lunde, Ken (Jan 5, 2009). "Appendix J: Japanese Character Sets" (PDF). CJKV Information Processing: Chinese, Japanese, Korean & Vietnamese Computing (Second ed.). Sebastopol, Calif.: O'Reilly Media. ISBN 978-0-596-51447-1.

== See also ==
- Xian (Taoism)
- List of mountains in China
- List of mountains in Japan
- List of mountains in Korea
