= Radical 109 =

Chinese character radical

目
- Radical 109 (U+2F6C)
- 目 (U+76EE) "eye"

Pronunciations
- Pinyin: mù
- Bopomofo: ㄇㄨˋ
- Gwoyeu Romatzyh: muh
- Wade–Giles: mu^{4}
- Cantonese Yale: muhk
- Jyutping: muk6
- Japanese Kana: ボク boku / モク moku (on'yomi) め me (kun'yomi)
- Sino-Korean: 목 mok

Names
- Chinese name(s): 目字旁 mùzìpáng and added 眼睛 YANJiNG
- Japanese name(s): 目/め me (Left) 目偏/めへん mehen
- Hangul: 눈 nun

Stroke order animation

Radical 109 or radical eye (目部) meaning "eye" is one of the 23 Kangxi radicals (214 radicals in total) composed of 5 strokes.

In the Kangxi Dictionary, there are 647 characters (out of 49,030) to be found under this radical.

目 is also the 105th indexing component in the Table of Indexing Chinese Character Components predominantly adopted by Simplified Chinese dictionaries published in mainland China.

== Evolution ==
Component of 民, 臣, 見, 面 and 頁; unrelated to 日, 皿, 貝 and 鼎. Form 罒 can represent both 目 and 网

Oracle bone script character

Bronze script character

Qin slip script

Shuowen ancient script

Large seal script character

Small seal script character

=== 直 ===
Ideogrammic compound 目 + 丨; unrelated to 真.

Oracle bone script character

Bronze script character

Large seal script character

Small seal script character

== Derived characters ==
Strokes	Characters
+0	目
+1	自
+2	盯
+3	盰 盱 盲 盳 直 盵
+4	盶 盷 相 盹 盺 盻 盼 盽 盾 盿 眀 省 眂 眃 眄 眅 眆 眇 眈 眉 眊 看 県 眍
+5	眎 眏 眐 眑 眒 眓 眔 眕 眖 眗 眘 眙 眚 眛 眜 眝 眞 真 眠 眡 眢 眣 眤 眥 眦 眧 眨 眩 眪 眫 眬 眿
+6	眭 眮 眯 眰 眱 眲 眳 眴 眵 眶 眷 眸 眹 眺 眻 眼 眽 眾
+7	着 睁 睂 睃 睄 睅 睆 睇 睈 睉 睊 睋 睌 睍 睎 睏 睐 睑
+8	睒 睓 睔 睕 睖 睗 睘 睙 睚 睛 睜 睝 睞 睟 睠 睡 睢 督 睤 睥 睦 睧 睨 睩 睪 睫 睬 睭
+9	煛 睮 睯 睰 睱 睲 睳 睴 睵 睶 睸 睹 睺 睻 睼 睽 睾 睿 瞀 瞁 瞂 瞃 瞄 瞅 瞆
+10	瞇 瞈 瞉 瞊 瞋 瞌 瞍 瞎 瞏 瞐 瞑 瞒 瞓
+11	瞔 瞕 瞖 瞗 瞘 瞙 瞚 瞛 瞜 瞝 瞞 瞟 瞠 瞡 瞢 瞣
+12	瞤 瞥 瞦 瞧 瞨 瞩 瞪 瞫 瞬 瞭 瞮 瞯 瞰 瞱 瞲 瞳 瞴 瞵 瞶 瞷
+13	瞸 瞹 瞺 瞻 瞼 瞽 瞾 瞿 矀 矁 矂
+14	矃 矄 矅 矆 矇 矈 矉 矊
+15	矋 矌 矍 矎 矏
+16	矐 矑 矒 矓
+18	矔
+19	睷 矕 矗
+20	矘 矙
+21	矖 矚

== Sinogram ==
In isolation it is a Chinese character meaning eye. It is one of the Kyōiku kanji or Kanji taught in elementary school in Japan. It is a first grade kanji.
