= Radical 106 =

Chinese character radical

白
- Radical 106 (U+2F69)
- 白 (U+767D) "white"

Pronunciations
- Pinyin: bái
- Bopomofo: ㄅㄞˊ
- Wade–Giles: pai2
- Cantonese Yale: baak6
- Jyutping: baak6
- Japanese Kana: ハク haku (on'yomi) しろ shiro / しら shira / しろ-い shiro-i (kun'yomi)
- Sino-Korean: 백 baek
- Hán-Việt: bạch

Names
- Chinese name(s): 白字旁 báizìpáng
- Japanese name(s): 白/しろ shiro (Left) 白偏/しろへん shirohen
- Hangul: 흰 huin

Stroke order animation

Radical 106 or radical white (白部) meaning "white" is one of the 23 Kangxi radicals (214 radicals in total) composed of 5 strokes.

In the Kangxi Dictionary, there are 109 characters (out of 49,030) to be found under this radical.

白 is also the 112th indexing component in the Table of Indexing Chinese Character Components predominantly adopted by Simplified Chinese dictionaries published in mainland China.

== Evolution ==
Unrelated to 日, 曰 and 自.

Oracle bone script character

Bronze script character

Large seal script character

Small seal script character

== Derived characters ==
Strokes	Characters
+0	白
+1	百 癿
+2	皀 皁 (=皂) 皂 皃 (=貌 -> 豸 / 兒 -> 儿 完 -> 宀)
+3	的
+4	皅 皆 皇 皈
+5	畠 皉 皊 皋 皌 皍 (=即 -> 卩)
+6	皎 皏 皐 (=皋) 皑^{SC} (=皚)
+7	皒 皓 皔 皕 皖
+8	皗 皘 皙
+10	皚 皛 皜 (=皓 / 暠 -> 日) 皝 皞
+11	皟 皠 皡 (=皞)
+12	皢 皣 皤 皥 (=皞)
+13	皦 皧 皨
+14	皩
+15	皪 皫
+16	皬
+18	皭

== Literature ==
- Fazzioli, Edoardo (1987). Chinese calligraphy : from pictograph to ideogram : the history of 214 essential Chinese/Japanese characters. calligraphy by Rebecca Hon Ko. New York: Abbeville Press. ISBN 0-89659-774-1.
