= Radical 132 =

Chinese character radical

自
- Radical 132 (U+2F83)
- 自 (U+81EA) "self"

Pronunciations
- Pinyin: zì
- Bopomofo: ㄗˋ
- Gwoyeu Romatzyh: tzyh
- Wade–Giles: tzŭ^{4}
- Cantonese Yale: jih
- Jyutping: zi
- Japanese Kana: ジ ji / シ shi (on'yomi) みずか-ら mizuka-ra (kun'yomi)
- Sino-Korean: 자 ja

Names
- Japanese name(s): 自/みずから mizukara
- Hangul: 스스로 seuseuro

Stroke order animation

Radical 132 or radical self (自部) meaning "self" is one of the 29 Kangxi radicals (214 radicals in total) composed of 6 strokes.

In the Kangxi Dictionary, there are 34 characters (out of 49,030) to be found under this radical.

自 is also the 137th indexing component in the Table of Indexing Chinese Character Components predominantly adopted by Simplified Chinese dictionaries published in mainland China.

== Evolution ==
An original form of 鼻 ("nose"); unrelated to 目 and 白.

Shang dynasty Oracle bone script

Western Zhou Bronze script

Chu slip and silk script

Shuowen ancient script

Large seal script

Small seal script

== Derived characters ==
Strokes	Characters
+0	自
+1	臫
+4	臬 臭
+6	臮 臯 (=皋 -> 白) 臰
+9	臱
+10	臲

== Sinogram ==
The radical is also used as an independent Chinese character. It is one of the Kyōiku kanji or Kanji taught in elementary school in Japan. It is a second grade kanji.

== Literature ==
- Fazzioli, Edoardo (1987). Chinese calligraphy : from pictograph to ideogram : the history of 214 essential Chinese/Japanese characters. calligraphy by Rebecca Hon Ko. New York: Abbeville Press. ISBN 0-89659-774-1.
- Lunde, Ken (Jan 5, 2009). "Appendix J: Japanese Character Sets" (PDF). CJKV Information Processing: Chinese, Japanese, Korean & Vietnamese Computing (Second ed.). Sebastopol, Calif.: O'Reilly Media. ISBN 978-0-596-51447-1.
