= Radical 209 =

Chinese character radical

鼻
- Radical 209 (U+2FD0)
- 鼻 (U+9F3B) "nose"

Pronunciations
- Pinyin: bí
- Bopomofo: ㄅㄧˊ
- Wade–Giles: pi2
- Cantonese Yale: bei6
- Jyutping: bei6
- Japanese Kana: ヒ, ビ hi, bi hana はな
- Sino-Korean: 비 bi
- Hán-Việt: tị

Names
- Japanese name(s): 鼻偏 hanaben
- Hangul: 코 ko

Stroke order animation

Radical 209 meaning "nose" (鼻部) is 1 of 2 Kangxi radicals (214 radicals total) composed of 14 strokes.

In the Kangxi Dictionary there are 49 characters (out of 49,030) to be found under this radical.

== Evolution ==
semantic 自 ("nose") + phonetic 畀 (OC *pids).

Shuowen seal script

=== 畀 ===
An arrow, see also 矢

Shang dynasty Oracle bone script

Western Zhou Bronze script

Large seal script character

== Characters with Radical 209 ==
strokes	character
+0	鼻
+2	鼼 鼽
+3	鼾 鼿
+5	齀 齁
+8	齂
+9	齃 齄
+10	齅 齆
+11	齇
+13	齈
+22	齉

== Sinogram ==
As an independent sinogram 鼻 is a Chinese character. It is one of the Kyōiku kanji or Kanji taught in elementary school in Japan. Specifically it is a third grade kanji.
