= Radical 154 =

Chinese character radical

貝
- Radical 154 (U+2F99)
- 貝 (U+8C9D) "shell"

Pronunciations
- Pinyin: bèi
- Bopomofo: ㄅㄟˋ
- Wade–Giles: pei4
- Cantonese Yale: bui3
- Jyutping: bui3
- Japanese Kana: ハイ hai / バイ bai (on'yomi) かい kai (kun'yomi)
- Sino-Korean: 패 pae

Names
- Chinese name(s): (Side) 貝字旁/贝字旁 bèizìpáng (Bottom) 貝字底/贝字底 bèizìdǐ
- Japanese name(s): 貝/かい kai 貝偏/かいへん kaihen 小貝/こがい kogai (as opposed to 大貝/おおがい ōgai standing for 頁)
- Hangul: 조개 jogae

Stroke order animation

Radical 154 or radical shell (貝部) meaning "shell" is one of the 20 Kangxi radicals (214 radicals in total) composed of 7 strokes.

In the Kangxi Dictionary, there are 277 characters (out of 49,030) to be found under this radical.

贝, The simplified form of 貝, is the 76 indexing component in the Table of Indexing Chinese Character Components predominantly adopted by Simplified Chinese dictionaries published in mainland China, while the traditional form 貝 is listed as its associated indexing component.

== Evolution ==
Cowrie shell used as currency in ancient China. Unrelated to 見 and 具.

Shang dynasty Oracle bone script

Shang dynasty Bronze script

Western Zhou Bronze script

Spring and Autumn period bronze script

Warring States period bronze script

Chu slip and silk script

Qin slip script

Large seal script character

Small seal script character

=== 得 (to acquire) ===
貝 transformed to 見 then to 旦.

Shang dynasty Oracle bone script

Shang dynasty Bronze script

Western Zhou Bronze script

Chu slip and silk script

Small seal script character

== Derived characters ==
Strokes	Characters (貝)	Characters (贝)
+0	貝	贝^{SC} (=貝)
+2	貞 貟 負	贞^{SC} (=貞) 负^{SC} (=負) 贠^{SC} (=貟)
+3	財 貢 貣 貤	贡^{SC} (=貢) 财^{SC} (=財)
+4	貥 貦 (=玩 -> 玉) 貧 貨 販 貪 貫 責 貭 (=質) 貮 (=貳)	责^{SC} (=責) 贤^{SC} (=賢) 败^{SC} (=敗 -> 攴) 账^{SC} (=賬) 货^{SC} (=貨) 质^{SC} (=質) 贩^{SC} (=販) 贪^{SC} (=貪) 贫^{SC} (=貧) 贬^{SC} (=貶) 购^{SC} (=購) 贮^{SC} (=貯) 贯^{SC} (=貫)
+5	貯 貰 貱 貲 貳 貴 貵 貶 買 貸 貹 貺 費 貼 貽 貾 貿 賀 賁	贰^{SC} (=貳) 贱^{SC} (=賤) 贲^{SC} (=賁) 贳^{SC} (=貰) 贴^{SC} (=貼) 贵^{SC} (=貴) 贶^{SC} (=貺) 贷^{SC} (=貸) 贸^{SC} (=貿) 费^{SC} (=費) 贺^{SC} (=賀) 贻^{SC} (=貽)
+6	賂 賃 賄 賅 賆 資 賈 賉 (=恤 -> 心) 賊 賋 賌 賍 (=贓) 賎^{JP} (=賤)	贼^{SC} (=賊) 贽^{SC} (=贄) 贾^{SC} (=賈) 贿^{SC} (=賄) 赀^{SC} (=貲) 赁^{SC} (=賃) 赂^{SC} (=賂) 赃^{SC} (=贓) 资^{SC} (=資) 赅^{SC} (=賅) 赆^{SC} (=贐)
+7	賏 賐 賑 賒 賓 賔 (=賓) 賕 賖 賗 賘 (=贓)	赇^{SC} (=賕) 赈^{SC} (=賑) 赉^{SC} (=賚) 赊^{SC} (=賒)
+8	賙 賚 賛 (=贊) 賜 賝 賞 賟 賠 賡 賢 賣 賤 賥 賦 賧 賨 賩 質 賫 (=齎 -> 齊) 賬	赋^{SC} (=賦) 赌^{SC} (=賭) 赍^{SC} (=賫=齎 -> 齊) 赎^{SC} (=贖) 赏^{SC} (=賞) 赐^{SC} (=賜) 赑^{SC} (=贔) 赒^{SC} (=賙) 赓^{SC} (=賡) 赔^{SC} (=賠) 赕^{SC} (=賧)
+9	賭 賮 (=贐) 賯 賰 賱 賲 賳 賴 賵	赖^{SC} (=賴) 赗^{SC} (=賵)
+10	賶 賷 (=齎 -> 齊) 賸 (=剩 -> 刀) 賹 賺 賻 購 賽	赘^{SC} (=贅) 赙^{SC} (=賻) 赚^{SC} (=賺) 赛^{SC} (=賽)
+11	賾 賿 贀 贂 贃 贄 贅	赜^{SC} (=賾)
+12	贆 贇 贈 贉 贊 贋 (=贗) 贌	赝^{SC} (=贗) 赞^{SC} (=贊) 赟^{SC} (=贇) 赠^{SC} (=贈)
+13	贍 贎 贏	赡^{SC} (=贍) 赢^{SC} (=贏)
+14	贐 贑 (=贛) 贒 (=賢) 贓 贔	
+15	贕 贖 贗 贘 (=賞)	
+16	贙 贚	
+17	贛	赣^{SC} (=贛)
+18	贜 (=贓)	

== Sinogram ==
The radical is also used as an independent Chinese character. It is one of the kyōiku kanji or kanji taught in elementary school in Japan. It is a first grade kanji.

== Literature ==
- Fazzioli, Edoardo (1987). Chinese calligraphy : from pictograph to ideogram : the history of 214 essential Chinese/Japanese characters. calligraphy by Rebecca Hon Ko. New York: Abbeville Press. ISBN 0-89659-774-1.
