= Radical 138 =

Chinese character radical

艮
- Radical 138 (U+2F89)
- 艮 (U+826E) "stopping, stillness"

Pronunciations
- Pinyin: gèn
- Bopomofo: ㄍㄣˋ
- Wade–Giles: ken4
- Cantonese Yale: gan3
- Jyutping: gan3
- Japanese Kana: ゴン gon / コン kon (on'yomi) うしとら ushitora (kun'yomi)
- Sino-Korean: 간 gan

Names
- Japanese name(s): 艮旁/こんづくり/ごんづくり kondzukuri/gondzukuri 艮/ごん/うしとら gon/ushitora 根旁/ねづくり nedzukuri
- Hangul: 괘이름 gwae ireum

Stroke order animation

Radical 138 or radical stopping (艮部) meaning "stopping" or "stillness" is one of the 29 Kangxi radicals (214 radicals in total) composed of 6 strokes. In Taoist Bagua cosmology, 艮 is the seventh of eight trigrams.

In the Kangxi Dictionary, there are just five characters (out of 49,030) to be found under this radical.

艮 is also the 146th indexing component in the Table of Indexing Chinese Character Components predominantly adopted by Simplified Chinese dictionaries published in mainland China.

== Evolution ==
=== 艮 ===
Ideogrammic compound 目 ("eye") + 人 ("person"); compare 見 ("see"); unrelated to 良; unrelated to left part of 即 which is 皀.

Shang dynasty Oracle bone script

Western Zhou Bronze script

Chu slip and silk script

Large seal script character

Small seal script character

=== 良 ===
Shang dynasty Oracle bone script

Western Zhou Bronze script

Chu slip and silk script

Large seal script character

Small seal script character

== Derived characters ==
Strokes	Characters
+0	艮
+1	良
+2	艰^{SC} (=艱)
+11	艱

== Literature ==
- Fazzioli, Edoardo (1987). Chinese calligraphy : from pictograph to ideogram : the history of 214 essential Chinese/Japanese characters. calligraphy by Rebecca Hon Ko. New York: Abbeville Press. ISBN 0-89659-774-1.
- Lunde, Ken (Jan 5, 2009). "Appendix J: Japanese Character Sets" (PDF). CJKV Information Processing: Chinese, Japanese, Korean & Vietnamese Computing (Second ed.). Sebastopol, Calif.: O'Reilly Media. ISBN 978-0-596-51447-1.
