= Radical 147 =

Chinese character radical

見
- Radical 147 (U+2F92)
- 見 (U+898B) "see"

Pronunciations
- Pinyin: jiàn
- Bopomofo: ㄐㄧㄢˋ
- Wade–Giles: chien4
- Cantonese Yale: gin3
- Jyutping: gin3, jin6
- Japanese Kana: ケン ken (on'yomi) み-る mi-ru (kun'yomi)
- Sino-Korean: 견 gyeon

Names
- Chinese name(s): (Side) 見字旁/见字旁 jiànzìpáng (Bottom) 見字底/见字底 jiànzìdǐ
- Japanese name(s): 見/みる miru
- Hangul: 볼 bol

Stroke order animation

Stroke order of the simplified form 见

Radical 147, also known as radical see (見部), represents the meaning "see" and is one of the 20 Kangxi radicals (out of a total of 214 radicals) composed of 7 strokes.

In the Kangxi Dictionary, there are 161 characters (out of 49,030) that can be found under this radical.

The simplified form of the character 見 is written as 见 and is the 78th indexing component in the Table of Indexing Chinese Character Components primarily used in Simplified Chinese dictionaries published in mainland China. The traditional form 見 is listed as its associated indexing component. The simplified form of this radical character consists of 4 strokes.

== Evolution ==
目 (eye) + 卩 (kneeling); compare 艮 and 頁; unrelated to 貝.

Oracle bone script character

Bronze script character

Chu slip and silk script

Large seal script character

Small seal script character

== Derived characters ==
Strokes	Characters (見)	Characters (见)
+0	見	见^{SC} (=見)
+2	覌 (=觀) 覙 (=覶 / 診 -> 言)	观^{SC} (=觀)
+3	覍 覎	觃^{SC} (=覎)
+4	規 覐 (=覺) 覑 覒 覓 覔 (=覓)	规^{SC} (=規) 觅^{SC} (=覓)
+5	覕 覗 覘 覚^{JP} (=覺)	觇^{SC} (=覘) 览^{SC} (=覽) 觉^{SC} (=覺)
+6	覛 覜	觊^{SC} (=覬)
+7	覝 覞 覟 覠 覡	觋^{SC} (=覡)
+8	覢 覣 覤 覥	觌^{SC} (=覿) 觍 (=覥)
+9	覦 覧^{JP} (=覽) 覨 覩 (=睹 -> 目) 親	觎^{SC} (=覦)
+10	覫 覬 覭 覮 覯	觏^{SC} (=覯)
+11	覰 覱 覲 観 (=觀)	觐^{SC} (=覲) 觑^{SC} (=覷)
+12	覴 覵 覶 覷 覸	
+13	覹 覺 覻 (=覰)	
+14	覼 (=覶) 覽	
+15	覾 覿	
+18	觀	

== Sinogram ==
As an independent sinogram It is one of the Kyōiku kanji or Kanji taught in elementary school in Japan. It is a first grade kanji.

== See also ==
- Mimi and Mi
- Unihan Database - U+898B
