= Radical 99 =

Chinese character radical

甘
- Radical 99 (U+2F62)
- 甘 (U+7518) "sweet"

Pronunciations
- Pinyin: gān
- Bopomofo: ㄍㄢ
- Gwoyeu Romatzyh: gan
- Wade–Giles: kan^{1}
- Cantonese Yale: gām
- Jyutping: gam1
- Japanese Kana: カン kan (on'yomi) あま-い ama-i (kun'yomi)
- Sino-Korean: 감 gam

Names
- Japanese name(s): 甘/あまい amai 甘/かん kan
- Hangul: 달 dal

Stroke order animation

Radical 99 or radical sweet (甘部) meaning "sweet" is one of the 23 Kangxi radicals (214 radicals in total) composed of 5 strokes.

In the Kangxi Dictionary, there are 22 characters (out of 49,030) to be found under this radical.

甘 is also the 101st indexing component in the Table of Indexing Chinese Character Components predominantly adopted by Simplified Chinese dictionaries published in mainland China.

== Evolution ==
甘 is sometimes represented as 日 in 音, 香, and 旨. See also 曰.

Oracle bone script character

Bronze script character

Large seal script character

Small seal script character

== Derived characters ==
Strokes	Characters
+0	甘
+3	𤮾 𤮿 甙
+4	甚
+5	㽍
+6	甛 甜
+8	㽎 甝 甞 (=嘗 -> 口)
+9	㽏
+10	㽐 𤯊
+12	㽑
+17	𤯑

== Sinogram ==
甘 is a Jōyō kanji, or a kanji used in writing the Japanese language. It is a secondary school kanji.

== See also ==
- List of jōyō kanji

== Literature ==
- Fazzioli, Edoardo (1987). Chinese calligraphy : from pictograph to ideogram : the history of 214 essential Chinese/Japanese characters. calligraphy by Rebecca Hon Ko. New York: Abbeville Press. ISBN 0-89659-774-1.
- Lunde, Ken (Jan 5, 2009). "Appendix J: Japanese Character Sets" (PDF). CJKV Information Processing: Chinese, Japanese, Korean & Vietnamese Computing (Second ed.). Sebastopol, Calif.: O'Reilly Media. ISBN 978-0-596-51447-1.
