= Radical 72 =

Chinese character radical

日
- Radical 72 (U+2F47)
- 日 (U+65E5) "sun, day"

Pronunciations
- Pinyin: rì
- Bopomofo: ㄖˋ
- Gwoyeu Romatzyh: ryh
- Wade–Giles: jih^{4}
- Cantonese Yale: yaht
- Jyutping: jat6
- Pe̍h-ōe-jī: ji̍t
- Japanese Kana: ニチ nichi / ジツ jitsu (on'yomi) ひ hi (kun'yomi)
- Sino-Korean: 일 il

Names
- Chinese name(s): (Left) 日字旁 rìzìpáng (Top) 日字頭/日字头 rìzìtóu
- Japanese name(s): 日/にち nichi (Left) 日偏/ひへん hihen (Left) 日偏/にちへん nichihen
- Hangul: 날 nal

Stroke order animation

Radical 72 or radical sun (日部) meaning "sun" or "day" is one of the 34 Kangxi radicals (214 radicals in total) composed of 4 strokes.

In the Kangxi Dictionary, there are 453 characters (out of 49,030) to be found under this radical.

日 is also the 75th indexing component in the Table of Indexing Chinese Character Components predominantly adopted by Simplified Chinese dictionaries published in mainland China, with 曰 (formerly Kangxi Radical 73 "say") and ⺜ being its associated indexing components.

== Evolution ==
Compare ☉ and 𓇳; unrelated to 曰, 甘, 臼, 白

Oracle bone script character

Bronze script character

Chu slip and silk script

Large seal script character

Small seal script character

== Derived characters ==
Strokes	Characters
+0	日
+1	旦 旧^{SC/JP} (=舊 -> 臼)
+2	早 旪 旫 旬 旭 旮 旯
+3	旨 旰 旱 旲 旳 旴 旵 时^{SC} (=時) 旷^{SC} (=曠) 旸^{SC} (=暘)
+4	旹 (=時) 旺 旻 旼 旽 旾 旿 昀 昁 昂 昃 昄 昅 昆 昇 昈 昉 昊 昋 昌 昍 明 昏 昐 昑 昒 易 昔 昕 昖 昗 昘 昙^{SC} (=曇) 昛^{SC variant}
+5	昚 昛^{TC variant} 昜 昝 昞 星 映 昡 昢 昣 昤 春 昦 昧 昨 昩 昪 昫 昬 昭 昮 是 昰 (=是) 昱 昲 昳 昴 昵 昶 昷 昸 昹 昺 昻 昼^{SC/JP} (=晝) 昽^{SC} (=曨) 显^{SC} (=顯 -> 頁) 昿^{JP nonstandard} (=曠)
+6	晀 晁 時 晃 晄 晅 晆 晇 晈 晉 晊 晋 晌 晍 晎 晏 晐 晑 晒 晓^{SC} (=曉) 晔 晕 晖^{SC} (=暉)
+7	晗 晘 晙 晚 晛 晜 晝 晞 晟 晠 晡 晢 晣 晤 晥 晦 晧 晨
+8	晩^{JP} (=晚) 晪 晫 晬 晭 普 景 晰 晱 晲 晳 晴 晵 晶 晷 晸 晹 智 晻 晼 晽 晾 晿 暀 暁^{JP} (=曉) 暂^{SC} (=暫) 暃 暑 暎^{SC/JP variant} (=映)
+9	暄 暅 暆 暇 暈 暉 暊 暋 暌 暍 暎^{TC variant} (=映) 暏 暐 暒 暓 暔 暕 暖 暗 暘 暙 暛^{SC variant}
+10	暚 暛^{TC variant} 暜 暝 暞 暟 暠 暡 暢 暣 暤 暥 暦^{JP} (=曆) 暧^{SC} (=曖) 暨 暮^{SC/JP variant} 暯^{SC variant} 暱^{GB TC variant} 曅^{GB TC variant}
+11	暩 暪 暫 暬 暭 (=皞) 暮^{TC variant} 暯^{TC variant} 暰 暱^{Traditional variant} 暲 暳 暴 暵 暶 暷 暹^{SC variant} 曃^{SC variant} 曂^{SC variant}
+12	暸 暹^{TC}/暹^{JP} 暺 暻 暼 暽 暾 暿 曀 曁^{Kangxi} (=暨) 曂^{TC variant} 曃^{TC variant} 曄 曅^{Traditional variant} 曆 曇 曈 曉 曊 曋 曌 (=照 -> 火) 曍 (=皞) 曔^{SC variant}
+13	曎 曏 曐 (=星) 曑 (=參 ->厶) 曒 曓 曔^{TC variant} 曕 曖 曗 曚^{GB TC variant} 曙^{SC/TC/JP variant}
+14	曘 曙^{Kangxi/KO variant} 曚^{Traditional variant} 曛 曜 曞^{GB TC variant} 曠^{GB TC variant}
+15	曝 曞^{Traditional variant} 曟 曠^{Traditional variant} 曡 (=疊 -> 田) 曢 曤 曥 曦 曧 曨
+16	曣
+17	曩
+19	曪 曫 曬 曮^{GB TC variant}
+20	曭 曮^{Traditional variant}
+21	曯

== Sinogram ==
The radical is also used as an independent Chinese character. It is one of the kyōiku kanji or kanji taught in elementary school in Japan. It is a first grade kanji.

== Literature ==
- Fazzioli, Edoardo (1987). Chinese calligraphy : from pictograph to ideogram : the history of 214 essential Chinese/Japanese characters. calligraphy by Rebecca Hon Ko. New York: Abbeville Press. ISBN 0-89659-774-1.
- Lunde, Ken (Jan 5, 2009). "Appendix J: Japanese Character Sets" (PDF). CJKV Information Processing: Chinese, Japanese, Korean & Vietnamese Computing (Second ed.). Sebastopol, Calif.: O'Reilly Media. ISBN 978-0-596-51447-1.
