= Radical 61 =

Chinese character radical

心
- Radical 61 (U+2F3C)
- 心 (U+5FC3) "heart"

Pronunciations
- Pinyin: xīn
- Bopomofo: ㄒㄧㄣ
- Gwoyeu Romatzyh: shin
- Wade–Giles: hsin^{1}
- Cantonese Yale: sām
- Jyutping: sam1
- Pe̍h-ōe-jī: sim
- Japanese Kana: シン shin (on'yomi) こころ kokoro (kun'yomi)
- Sino-Korean: 심 shim

Names
- Chinese name(s): (忄) 豎心旁/竖心旁 shùxīnpáng (Bottom/⺗) 心字底 xīnzìdǐ (⺗) 豎心底/竖心底 shùxīndǐ
- Japanese name(s): 心 kokoro (忄) 立心偏/りっしんべん risshinben (Bottom/㣺) 下心/したごころ shitagokoro
- Hangul: 마음 maeum (忄) 심방변/心傍邊 simbangbyeon

Stroke order animation

Radical 61 or radical heart (心部) meaning "heart" or "heart/mind" is one of 34 of the 214 Kangxi radicals that are composed of 4 strokes.

When appearing at the left side of a Chinese character, the radical transforms into 忄, which consists of three strokes. When appearing at the bottom, it sometimes transforms into ⺗.

In the Kangxi Dictionary, there are 1,115 characters (out of 40,000) to be found under this radical.

心 is also the 98th indexing component in the Table of Indexing Chinese Character Components predominantly adopted by Simplified Chinese dictionaries published in mainland China. Two associated indexing components, 忄 and ⺗, are affiliated to the principal indexing component 心.

== Evolution ==
=== 心 ===
Oracle bone script

Shang dynasty bronze script

Western Zhou bronze script

Spring and Autumn period bronze script

Warring States period bronze script

Chu slip and silk script

Qin slip script

Large seal script

Small seal script

=== 必 ===
Compare 戈.

Western Zhou bronze script

Large seal script

Small seal script

== Derived characters ==
Strokes	Characters
+0	心 忄
+1	必 忆^{SC} (=憶)
+2	忇 忈 (=仁 -> 人) 忉 忊
+3	忋 忌 忍 忎 忏 忐 忑 忒 忓 忔 忕 忖 志 忘 忙 忚 忛 応^{JP} (=應)
+4	忝 忞 忟 忠 忡 忢 忣 忤 忥 忦 忧^{SC} (=憂) 忨 忩 忪 快 忬 忭 忮 忯 忰 (=悴) 忱 忲 忳 忴 念 忶 忷 忸 忹 忺 忻 忼 忽 忾 忿 怀^{SC} (=懷) 态^{SC} (=態) 怂^{SC} (=慫) 怃^{SC} (=憮) 怄^{SC} (=慪) 怅^{SC} (=悵) 怆^{SC} (=愴)
+5	怇 怈 怉 怊 怋 怌 怍 怎 怏 怐 怑 怒 怓 怔 怕 怖 怗 怘 怙 怚 怛 怜 思 怞 怟 怠 怡 怢 怣 怤 急 怦 性 怨 怩 怪 怫 怬 怭 怮 怯 怰 怱 怲 怳 (=恍) 怴 怵 怶 怷 怸 怹 怺 总^{SC} (=總 -> 糸) 怼^{SC} (=懟) 怽 怾 怿^{SC} (=懌)
+6	恀 恁 恂 恃 恄 恅 恆 恇 恈 恉 恊 恋^{SC}/恋^{JP} (=戀) 恌 恍 恎 恏 恐 恑 恒^{SC/JP/variant} (=恆) 恓 恔 恕 恖 恗 恘 恙 恚 恛 恜 恝 恞 恟 恠 恡 (=吝 -> 口) 恢 恣 恤 恥 恦 恧 恨 恩 恪 恫 恬 恭 恮 息 恰 恱 (=悅) 恲 恳^{SC} (=懇) 恴 (=德 -> 彳) 恵^{JP} (=惠) 恶^{SC} (=惡) 恷 (=恘) 恸^{SC} (=慟) 恹^{SC} (=懨) 恺^{SC} (=愷) 恻^{SC} (=惻) 恼^{SC} (=惱) 恽^{SC} (=惲) 悔^{JP}
+7	恾 恿 悀 悁 悂 悃 悄 悅 悆 悇 悈 悉 悊 悋 悌 悍 悎 悏 悐 悑 悒 悓 悔^{SC/TC/KO} 悕 悖 悗 悘 悙 悚 悛 悜 悝 悞 悟 悠 悡 悢 患 悤 悥 悦^{SC/HK/JP} (=悅) 悧 您 悩^{JP} (=惱) 悪^{JP} (=惡) 悫^{SC} (=愨) 悬^{SC} (=懸) 悭^{SC} (=慳) 悮^{SC} (=悞) 悯^{SC} (=憫)
+8	悰 悱 悲 悳 (=德 -> 彳) 悴 悵 悶 悷 悸 悹 悺 悻 悼 悽 悾 悿 惀 惁 惂 惃 惄 情 惆 惇 惈 惉 惊^{SC} (=驚 -> 馬) 惋 惌 惍 惎 惏 惐 惑 惒 惓 惔 惕 惖 (=惕) 惗 惘 惙 惚 惛 惜 惝 惞 惟 惠 惡 惢 惣 惤 惥 惦 惧^{SC/JP/variant} (=懼) 惨^{SC} (=慘) 惩^{SC} (=懲) 惪 (=德 -> 彳) 惫^{SC} (=憊) 惬^{SC} (=愜) 惭^{SC} (=慚) 惮^{SC} (=憚) 惯^{SC} (=慣) 惹^{SC variant} 愥^{SC variant}
+9	惰 惱 惲 想 惴 惵 惶 惷 惸 惹^{TC variant} 惺 惻 惼 惽 (=惛) 惾 惿 愀 愁 愂 愃 愄 愅 愆 愇 愈 愉 愊 愋 愌 愍 愎 意 愐 愑 愒 愓 愔 愕 愖 愗 愘 愙 愚 愛 愜 愝 愞 感 愠^{SC} (=慍) 愡 愢 愣 愤^{SC} (=憤) 愥^{TC variant} 愦^{SC} (=憒) 慨 愧^{SC variant} 慅^{SC variant} 愲^{SC variant} 愺^{SC variant} 慌^{SC/JP variant}
+10	愧^{TC variant} 愨 愩 愪 愫 愬 愭 愮 愯 愰 愱 愲^{TC variant} 愳 愴 愵 愶 愷 愸 愹 愺^{TC variant} 愻 愼^{Kangxi} (=慎) 愽 愾 愿 (also SC form of 願 -> 頁) 慀 慁 慂 慃 慄 慅^{TC variant} 慆 慇 慈 慉 慊 態 慌^{TC variant} 慍 慎^{SC/TC}/慎^{JP} 慏 慐 慕^{SC/JP} 慔^{SC variant} 慑^{SC} (=懾) 慥^{SC variant} 慩^{SC variant}
+11	慕^{TC} 慒 慓 慔^{TC variant} 慕 慖 慗 慘 慙 慚 慛 慜 慝 慞 慟 慠 慡 慢 慣 慤 (=愨) 慥^{TC variant} 慦 慧 慩^{TC variant} 慪 慫 慬 慭^{SC} (=憖) 慮 慯 慰 慱 慲 慳 慴 慵 慶 慷 慸 慹 慺 慻 慼 慽 慾 慿 (=憑) 憀 憁 憃 憄 憅 (=慟) 憆 憇 憈^{SC variant} 憎^{JP} 憨^{SC variant}
+12	憎^{SC/TC} 憂 憈^{TC variant} 憉 憊 憋 憌 憍 憏 憐 憑 憒 憓 憔 憕 憖 憗 憘 憙 憚 憛 憜 憝 憞 憟 憠 憡 憢 憣 憥 憦 憧 憨^{TC variant} 憩 憪 憫 憬 憭 憮 憯 憰 憱 憲 憳 憤^{SC/JP variant} 憼^{SC variant} 憽^{SC variant} 懂^{SC variant} 懊^{SC variant}
+13	憤^{TC variant} 憴 憵 憶 憷 憸 憹 憺 憻 憼^{TC variant} 憽^{TC variant} 憾 憿 懀 懁 懂^{TC variant} 懃 懄 懅 懆 懇 懈 應 懊^{TC variant} 懋 懌 懍 懎 懏 懐^{JP} (=懷) 懑^{SC} (=懣) 懒^{SC} (=懶) 懓 懔^{SC/variant} (=懍) 懕 懖 懜^{SC variant} 懞^{SC variant}
+14	懗 懘 懙 懚 懛 懜^{TC variant} 懝 懞^{TC variant} 懟 懠 懡 懢 懣 懤 懥 懦 懧 懨 懩 懪 懫 懬^{GB TC variant} 懭^{GB TC variant} 懮 懯 懰 懱 懲^{JP}
+15	懬^{Traditional variant} 懭^{Traditional variant} 懲^{SC/TC} 懳 懴 (=懺)
+16	懵 懶 懷 懸
+17	懹 懺 懻 懽^{GB TC variant}
+18	懼 懽^{Traditional variant} (=歡 -> 欠) 懾 懿
+19	戀 戁 戂
+20	戃 戄
+21	戅 (=戇) 戆^{SC} (=戇)
+24	戇

== Sinogram ==
As a single radical the Chinese character means heart. It is one of the Kyōiku kanji or Kanji taught in elementary school in Japan. It is a second grade kanji.

== Literature ==
- Fazzioli, Edoardo (1987). Chinese calligraphy : from pictograph to ideogram : the history of 214 essential Chinese/Japanese characters. calligraphy by Rebecca Hon Ko. New York: Abbeville Press. ISBN 0-89659-774-1.
- Leyi Li: “Tracing the Roots of Chinese Characters: 500 Cases”. Beijing 1993, ISBN 978-7-5619-0204-2

== See also ==
- Heart (Chinese medicine)
