= Radical 206 =

Chinese character radical

鼎
- Radical 206 (U+2FCD)
- 鼎 (U+9F0E) "sacrificial tripod, cauldron"

Pronunciations
- Pinyin: dǐng
- Bopomofo: ㄉㄧㄥˇ
- Wade–Giles: ting3
- Cantonese Yale: ding2
- Jyutping: ding2
- Japanese Kana: テイ tei かなえ kanae
- Sino-Korean: 정 jeong
- Hán-Việt: đỉnh

Names
- Japanese name(s): 鼎 kanae
- Hangul: 솥 sot

Stroke order animation

Radical 206 meaning "sacrificial tripod" or "three-legged cauldron" (鼎部) is 1 of 4 Kangxi radicals (214 radicals total) composed of 13 strokes.

In the Kangxi Dictionary there are 14 characters (out of 49,030) to be found under this radical.

== Evolution ==
=== 鼎 ===
Shang dynasty Oracle bone script

Western Zhou Bronze script

Large seal script character

Small seal script character

=== 具 ===
鼎 ("cauldron") + 廾 ("two hands")

Shang dynasty Oracle bone script

Western Zhou Bronze script

Large seal script character

Small seal script character

=== 真 ===
Phono-semantic compound: semantic 鼎/貝 + phonetic 𠂈 (*tˤiŋ).

Oracle bone script character

Bronze script character

Small seal script character

== Characters with Radical 206 ==
seal script character

strokes	character
+0	鼎
+2	鼏 鼑 鼐
+3	鼒

== Literature ==
- Fazzioli, Edoardo (1987). Chinese calligraphy : from pictograph to ideogram : the history of 214 essential Chinese/Japanese characters. calligraphy by Rebecca Hon Ko. New York: Abbeville Press. ISBN 0-89659-774-1.
- Lunde, Ken (Jan 5, 2009). "Appendix J: Japanese Character Sets" (PDF). CJKV Information Processing: Chinese, Japanese, Korean & Vietnamese Computing (Second ed.). Sebastopol, Calif.: O'Reilly Media. ISBN 978-0-596-51447-1.
