= Radical 26 =

Chinese character radical

卩
- Radical 26 (U+2F19)
- 卩 (U+5369) "seal"

Pronunciations
- Pinyin: jié
- Bopomofo: ㄐㄧㄝˊ
- Wade–Giles: chieh2
- Cantonese Yale: jit
- Jyutping: zit3
- Pe̍h-ōe-jī: chiat
- Japanese Kana: セツ setsu (on'yomi) わりふ warifu (kun'yomi)
- Sino-Korean: 절 jeol
- Hán-Việt: tiết

Names
- Chinese name(s): (卩) 單耳旁/单耳旁 dān'ěrpáng (卩) 單耳刀/单耳刀 dān'ěrdāo (㔾) 卷字底 juǎnzìdǐ (㔾, Simp.) 仓字底 cāngzìdǐ
- Japanese name(s): 節旁/ふしづくり fushizukuri まげわりふ magewarifu わりふ warifu
- Hangul: 무릎마디 mureup-madi

Stroke order animation

Radical 26 or radical seal (卩部) meaning "seal" is one of the 23 Kangxi radicals (214 radicals total) composed of two strokes.

It usually transforms as 㔾 when appearing at the bottom of a Chinese character.

In the Kangxi Dictionary, there are 40 characters (out of 49,030) to be found under this radical.

卩 is also the 21st indexing component in the Table of Indexing Chinese Character Components predominantly adopted by Simplified Chinese dictionaries published in mainland China, with 㔾 being its associated indexing component.

== Evolution ==
Component of 光, 見 and 頁.

Oracle bone script character

Bronze script character

Small seal script character

== Derived characters ==
Strokes	Characters
+0	卩
+1	卪
+2	卫^{SC} (=衛/衞 -> 行) 卬
+3	卭 卮 卯
+4	印 危
+5	卲 即 却^{SC/JP} (=卻) 卵
+6	卶 卷 卸 卺
+7	卹 卻 卼 卽
+8	卿
+9	卾
+11	厀 厁

In Unihan database, 㔾 is indexed radical 26 + 1 stroke (3 strokes in total), with the extra stroke unspecified. Traditionally, this character or component consists of only two strokes (𠃌乚).

== Literature ==
- Fazzioli, Edoardo (1987). Chinese calligraphy : from pictograph to ideogram : the history of 214 essential Chinese/Japanese characters. calligraphy by Rebecca Hon Ko. New York: Abbeville Press. ISBN 0-89659-774-1.
- Lunde, Ken (Jan 5, 2009). "Appendix J: Japanese Character Sets" (PDF). CJKV Information Processing: Chinese, Japanese, Korean & Vietnamese Computing (Second ed.). Sebastopol, Calif.: O'Reilly Media. ISBN 978-0-596-51447-1.
