= Radical 181 =

Chinese character radical

頁
- Radical 181 (U+2FB4)
- 頁 (U+9801) "leaf, head, sheet, page"

Pronunciations
- Pinyin: yè
- Bopomofo: ㄧㄝˋ
- Wade–Giles: yeh4
- Cantonese Yale: yip6
- Jyutping: jip6
- Japanese Kana: ケツ ketsu / ヨウ yō (on'yomi) ページ pēji (kun'yomi)
- Sino-Korean: 혈 hyeol
- Hán-Việt: hiệt, hệt

Names
- Chinese name(s): 頁字旁/页字旁 yèzìpáng
- Japanese name(s): 大貝/おおがい ōgai 一ノ貝/いちのかい ichinokai
- Hangul: 머리 meori

Stroke order animation

Stroke order of the simplified form 页

Radical 181 or radical leaf (頁部) meaning "leaf", "head" or "page" is one of the 11 Kangxi radicals (214 radicals in total) composed of 9 strokes.

In the Kangxi Dictionary, there are 372 characters (out of 49,030) to be found under this radical.

页, the simplified form of 頁, is the 128th indexing component in the Table of Indexing Chinese Character Components predominantly adopted by Simplified Chinese dictionaries published in mainland China, while the traditional form 頁 is listed as its associated indexing component.

== Evolution ==
Pictogram: 首 (head) + 卩 (kneeling); compare 見; unrelated to 貝.

Oracle bone script character

Bronze script character

Chu slip and silk script

Large seal script character

Small seal script character

== Derived characters ==
Strokes	Characters (頁)	Characters (页)
+0	頁	页^{SC} (=頁)
+2	頂 頃 頄	顶^{SC} (=頂) 顷^{SC} (=頃)
+3	項 順 頇 須 頉	顸^{SC} (=頇) 项^{SC} (=項) 顺^{SC} (=順) 须^{SC} (=須)
+4	頊 頋 頌 頍 頎 頏 預 頑 頒 頓 頙	顼^{SC} (=頊) 顽^{SC} (=頑) 顾^{SC} (=顧) 顿^{SC} (=頓) 颀^{SC} (=頎) 颁^{SC} (=頒) 颂^{SC} (=頌) 颃^{SC} (=頏) 预^{SC} (=預)
+5	頔 頕 頖 頗 領 頚^{JP}	颅^{SC} (=顱) 领^{SC} (=領) 颇^{SC} (=頗) 颈^{SC} (=頸)
+6	頛 頜 頝 頞 頟 頠 頡 頢 頣 頦 頧 頨 頩 頪 頫 頬^{JP} (=頰)	颉^{SC} (=頡) 颊^{SC} (=頰) 颋^{SC} (=頲) 颌^{SC} (=頜) 颍^{SC} (=潁 -> 水) 颎^{SC} (=熲 -> 火) 颏^{SC} (=頦)
+7	頤 頥 (=頤) 頭 頮 頯 頰 頱 頲 頳 頴 (=穎 -> 禾) 頵 頶 頷 頸 頹 頺 (=頹) 頻 頼^{JP} (=賴 -> 貝) 頽 (=頹)	颐^{SC} (=頤) 频^{SC} (=頻) 颒^{SC} (=頮) 颓^{SC} (=頹) 颔^{SC} (=頷) 颕 (=頴) 颖^{SC} (=穎 -> 禾)
+8	頿 顀 顁 顂 顃 顄 顅 顆 顇 (=悴 -> 心) 顈 顉 顊	颗^{SC} (=顆)
+9	頾 顋 (=腮 -> 肉) 題 額 顎 顏 顐 顑 顒 顓 顔^{JP/GB TC} (=顏) 顕^{JP} (=顯)	题^{SC} (=題) 颙^{SC} (=顒) 颚^{SC} (=顎) 颛^{SC} (=顓) 颜^{SC} (=顏) 额^{SC} (=額)
+10	顖 顗 願 顙 顚 (=顛) 顛 顜 顝 類	颞^{SC} (=顳) 颟^{SC} (=顢) 颠^{SC} (=顛) 颡^{SC} (=顙)
+11	顟 顠 顡 顢 顣 (=蹙 -> 足)	
+12	顤 顥 顦 (=憔 -> 心) 顧 顨	颢^{SC} (=顥) 颣 (=纇 -> 糸)
+13	顩 顪 顫	颤^{SC} (=顫)
+14	顬 顭 顮 顯	颥^{SC} (=顬)
+15	顰	颦^{SC} (=顰)
+16	顱 顲	
+17		颧^{SC} (=顴)
+18	顳 顴	

== Literature ==
- Fazzioli, Edoardo (1987). Chinese calligraphy : from pictograph to ideogram : the history of 214 essential Chinese/Japanese characters. calligraphy by Rebecca Hon Ko. New York: Abbeville Press. ISBN 0-89659-774-1.
- Lunde, Ken (Jan 5, 2009). "Appendix J: Japanese Character Sets" (PDF). CJKV Information Processing: Chinese, Japanese, Korean & Vietnamese Computing (Second ed.). Sebastopol, Calif.: O'Reilly Media. ISBN 978-0-596-51447-1.
