= Radical 73 =

Chinese character radical

曰
- Radical 73 (U+2F48)
- 曰 (U+66F0) "say"

Pronunciations
- Pinyin: yuē
- Bopomofo: ㄩㄝ
- Gwoyeu Romatzyh: iue
- Wade–Giles: yüeh^{1}
- Cantonese Yale: yeuhk, yuht
- Jyutping: joek6, jyut6
- Pe̍h-ōe-jī: oat
- Japanese Kana: エツ etsu (on'yomi) いわ-く iwa-ku (kun'yomi)
- Sino-Korean: 왈 wal

Names
- Chinese name(s): 扁日頭/扁日头 biǎnrìtóu
- Japanese name(s): 平日/ひらび hirabi 曰く/いわく iwaku
- Hangul: 가로되 garodwoe

Stroke order animation

Radical 73 or radical say (曰部) meaning "say" is one of the 34 Kangxi radicals (214 radicals in total) composed of 4 strokes.

In the Kangxi Dictionary, there are 37 characters (out of 49,030) to be found under this radical.

In the Table of Indexing Chinese Character Components predominantly adopted by Simplified Chinese dictionaries published in mainland China, this radical is merged to radical sun (日) as an associated indexing component.

== Evolution ==
mouth (口) with word or breath (一) coming out. Compare 甘 and 言; Unrelated to 日

Oracle bone script

Bronze script

Chu slip and silk script

Large seal script

Small seal script

Qing dynasty clerical script

=== 曲 ===
Oracle bone script

Bronze script

Large seal script

Small seal script

== Derived characters ==
Strokes	Characters
+0	曰
+1	曱
+2	曲 曳
+3	更 曵 (=曳)
+4	曶
+5	曷
+6	書 曺^{KO} (=曹)
+7	曹 曻 曼 曽^{JP} (=曾)
+8	曾 替 最 朁 朂
+9	會
+10	朄 朅
+12	朆
+17	朇

== Literature ==
- Fazzioli, Edoardo (1987). Chinese calligraphy : from pictograph to ideogram : the history of 214 essential Chinese/Japanese characters. calligraphy by Rebecca Hon Ko. New York: Abbeville Press. ISBN 0-89659-774-1.
- Lunde, Ken (Jan 5, 2009). "Appendix J: Japanese Character Sets" (PDF). CJKV Information Processing: Chinese, Japanese, Korean & Vietnamese Computing (Second ed.). Sebastopol, Calif.: O'Reilly Media. ISBN 978-0-596-51447-1.
