= Kyōiku kanji =

Basic 1,026 Japanese kanji taught in schools

The kyōiku kanji (教育漢字; literally "education kanji") are kanji which Japanese elementary school students should learn from first through sixth grade. Also known as gakushū kanji (学習漢字; literally "learning kanji"), these kanji are listed on the Gakunenbetsu kanji haitō hyō (学年別漢字配当表(ja); literally "table of kanji by school year"). The table is developed and maintained by the Japanese Ministry of Education (MEXT). Although the list is designed for Japanese students, it can also be used as a sequence of learning characters by non-native speakers as a means of focusing on the most commonly used kanji.

Kyōiku kanji are a subset (1,026) of the 2,136 characters of jōyō kanji.

== Versions of the list ==
A list of all jōyō kanji according to Halpern's KKLD indexing system, with the kyōiku kanji coloured according to grade level

- 1946 created with 881 characters
- 1977 expanded to 996 characters
- 1989 expanded to 1,006 characters, with 20 kanji added and 10 removed. The revised list came into effect in 1992.
- 2017 expanded to 1,026 characters
  - The following 20 characters, all used in prefecture names, were added in 2017.
  - 茨 (Ibaraki), 媛 (Ehime), 岡 (Shizuoka, Okayama and Fukuoka), 潟 (Niigata), 岐 (Gifu), 熊 (Kumamoto), 香 (Kagawa), 佐 (Saga), 埼 (Saitama), 崎 (Nagasaki and Miyazaki), 滋 (Shiga), 鹿 (Kagoshima), 縄 (Okinawa), 井 (Fukui), 沖 (Okinawa), 栃 (Tochigi), 奈 (Kanagawa and Nara), 梨 (Yamanashi), 阪 (Ōsaka), 阜 (Gifu)

== List by grade ==
- The Gakunenbetsu kanji haitō hyō does not contain readings or meanings of each kanji.
- Many kanji have complex meanings and nuances, or express concepts not directly translatable into English. In those cases, the English meanings mentioned here are approximate.
- In the kun'yomi readings, readings after - (hyphen) are okurigana.
- A - (hyphen) at the end of the -yomi corresponds to a small tsu in kana, which indicates that the following consonant is geminated.

=== First grade (80 kanji) ===
#	Kanji	Meaning	On'yomi	Kun'yomi	Strokes
1	一	one	ichi, itsu	hito-tsu	1
2	二	two	ni, ji	futa-tsu	2
3	三	three	san	mit-tsu	3
4	四	four	shi	yot-tsu, yon	5
5	五	five	go	itsu-tsu	4
6	六	six	roku	mut-tsu	4
7	七	seven	shichi	nana-tsu, nana	2
8	八	eight	hachi	yat-tsu	2
9	九	nine	ku, kyū	kokono-tsu	2
10	十	ten	jū	tō	2
11	百	hundred	hyaku	momo	6
12	千	thousand	sen	chi	3
13	上	top, above	jō	ue	3
14	下	bottom, below	ka, ge	shita, shimo, moto	3
15	左	left	sa	hidari	5
16	右	right	u, yū	migi	5
17	中	inside, middle	chū, jū	naka	4
18	大	large	dai, tai	ō-kii, ō	3
19	小	small	shō	chii-sai, ko, o	3
20	月	month, moon	gatsu, getsu	tsuki	4
21	日	day, sun	nichi, jitsu	hi, ka	4
22	年	year	nen	toshi	6
23	早	early	sō, sa	haya-i	6
24	木	tree	moku, boku	ki	4
25	林	woods	rin	hayashi	8
26	山	mountain	san	yama	3
27	川	river	sen	kawa	3
28	土	soil	to, do	tsuchi	3
29	空	sky, empty	kū	sora, a-ku, kara	8
30	田	rice field	den	da, ta	5
31	天	heaven, sky	ten	ame, ama	4
32	生	living, birth, raw	sei, shō	i-kiru, u-mu, nama	5
33	花	flower	ka	hana	7
34	草	grass	sō	kusa	9
35	虫	insect	chū	mushi	6
36	犬	dog	ken	inu	4
37	人	person	jin, nin	hito	2
38	名	name	mei, myō	na	6
39	女	female	jo, nyo	on'na	3
40	男	male	dan, nan	otoko	7
41	子	child	shi, su	ko	3
42	目	eye	moku	me	5
43	耳	ear	ji, ni	mimi	6
44	口	mouth	kō	kuchi	3
45	手	hand	shu	te	4
46	足	foot, suffice	soku	ashi, ta-riru	7
47	見	see	ken, gen	mi-ru	7
48	音	sound	on	ne, oto	9
49	力	power	riki, ryoku	chikara	2
50	気	spirit, air	ki, ke	iki	6
51	円	yen, circle	en	maru	4
52	入	enter	nyū	hai-ru, i-ru	2
53	出	exit	shutsu	de-ru	5
54	立	stand up	ritsu	ta-tsu	5
55	休	rest	kyū	yasu-mu	6
56	先	previous	sen	saki	6
57	夕	evening	seki	yū	3
58	本	book	hon	moto	5
59	文	text	bun, mon	fumi	4
60	字	character	ji	aza	6
61	学	study	gaku	mana-bu	8
62	校	school	kō	kase	10
63	村	village	son	mura	7
64	町	town	chō	machi	7
65	森	forest	shin	mori	12
66	正	correct	sei, shō	tada-shii, masa	5
67	水	water	sui	mizu	4
68	火	fire	ka	hi	4
69	玉	jewel, ball	gyoku	tama	5
70	王	king	ō	kimi	4
71	石	stone	seki, koku	ishi	5
72	竹	bamboo	chiku	take	6
73	糸	thread	shi	ito	6
74	貝	shellfish	bai	kai	7
75	車	vehicle	sha	kuruma	7
76	金	gold, money	kin	kane, kana	8
77	雨	rain	u	ame, ama	8
78	赤	red	seki	aka	7
79	青	blue	sei, shō	ao	8
80	白	white	haku	shiro, shira	5

=== Second grade (160 kanji) ===
#	Kanji	Meaning	On	Kun	Strokes
81	数	number, count	sū	kazu	13
82	多	many, much	ta	oo-i	6
83	少	a few, a little	shō	suku-nai, suko-shi	4
84	万	ten thousand	ban, man	yorozu	3
85	半	half	han	naka-ba	5
86	形	shape	kei, gyō	katachi	7
87	太	thick	ta	futo-i	4
88	細	thin	sai	hoso-i	11
89	広	wide	kō	hiro-i	5
90	長	long, leader	chō	naga-i	8
91	点	point	ten	bochi	9
92	丸	circle	gan	maru	3
93	交	intersect	kō	maji-waru	6
94	光	light	kō	hikari	6
95	角	corner, horn	kaku	kado, tsuno, sumi	7
96	計	measure	kei	haka-ru	9
97	直	straight, fix	choku, jiki	tada-chini, nao-su	8
98	線	line	sen	suji	15
99	矢	arrow	shi	ya	5
100	弱	weak	jaku	yowa-i	10
101	強	strong	kyō	tsuyo-i	11
102	高	high	kō	taka-i	10
103	同	same	dō	ona-ji	6
104	親	parent	shin	oya	16
105	母	mother	bo	haha, kā	5
106	父	father	fu	chichi, tou	4
107	姉	older sister	shi	ane	8
108	兄	older brother	kei, kyō	ani	5
109	弟	younger brother	tei, dai	otōto	7
110	妹	younger sister	mai	imōto	8
111	自	oneself	ji, shi	mizuka-ra	6
112	友	friend	yū	tomo	4
113	体	body	tai	karada	7
114	毛	hair	mō	ke	4
115	頭	head	tō	atama	16
116	顔	face	gan	kao	18
117	首	neck	shu	kubi	9
118	心	heart	shin	kokoro	4
119	時	time	ji	toki	10
120	曜	day of the week	yō		18
121	朝	morning	chō	asa	12
122	昼	daytime	chū	hiru	9
123	夜	night	ya	yoru	8
124	分	minute, understand	fun, bun	wa-karu	4
125	週	week	shū		11
126	春	spring	shun	haru	9
127	夏	summer	ka	natsu	10
128	秋	autumn	shū	aki	9
129	冬	winter	tō	fuyu	5
130	今	now	kon	ima	4
131	新	new	shin	atara-shii, ara-ta	13
132	古	old	ko	furu-i	5
133	間	interval	kan, ken	ma, aida	12
134	方	direction	hō	kata	4
135	北	north	hoku	kita	5
136	南	south	nan	minami	9
137	東	east	tō	higashi, azuma	8
138	西	west	sei, sai	nishi	6
139	遠	far	en	tō-i	13
140	近	near	kin	chika-i	7
141	前	before	zen	mae	9
142	後	after	go, kō	nochi, ushi-ro, ato	9
143	内	inside	nai	uchi	4
144	外	outside	gai, ge	soto, hoka, hazu-su	5
145	場	place	jō	ba	12
146	地	ground	chi, ji		6
147	国	country	koku	kuni	8
148	園	garden	en	sono	13
149	谷	valley	koku	tani	7
150	野	field	ya	no	11
151	原	meadow, plain	gen	hara	10
152	里	hometown	ri	sato	7
153	市	city	shi	ichi	5
154	京	capital	kyō, kei	miyako	8
155	風	wind, -style	fū	kaze	9
156	雪	snow	setsu	yuki	11
157	雲	cloud	un	kumo	12
158	池	pond	chi	ike	6
159	海	sea	kai	umi	9
160	岩	rock	gan	iwa	8
161	星	star	sei	hoshi	9
162	室	room	shitsu	muro	9
163	戸	door	ko	to, be	4
164	家	house	ka, ke	ie	10
165	寺	Buddhist temple	ji	tera	6
166	通	pass through, commute	tsū	tō-ru, kayo-u	10
167	門	gates	mon	kado	8
168	道	road	dō	michi	12
169	話	talk	wa	hanashi, hana-su	13
170	言	say	gen, gon	i-u, koto	7
171	答	answer	tō	kota-eru	12
172	声	voice	sei	koe	7
173	聞	hear, listen, ask	bun, mon	ki-ku	14
174	語	language	go	kata-ru	14
175	読	read	doku	yo-mu	14
176	書	write	sho	ka-ku	10
177	記	record	ki	shiru-su	10
178	紙	paper	shi	kami	10
179	画	brush stroke	ga, kaku		8
180	絵	picture	kai, e		12
181	図	drawing	zu	haka-ru	7
182	工	craft	kō, ku		3
183	教	teach	kyō	oshi-eru	11
184	晴	clear	sei	hare	12
185	思	think	shi	omo-u	9
186	考	consider	kō	kanga-eru	6
187	知	know	chi	shi-ru	8
188	才	age, ability	sai, zai	wazukani, zae	3
189	理	reason	ri	kotowari	11
190	算	calculate	san		14
191	作	make	saku	tsuku-ru	7
192	元	origin	gen, gan	moto	4
193	食	eat	shoku	ta-beru, ku-u	9
194	肉	meat	niku		6
195	馬	horse	ba	uma, ma	10
196	牛	cow	gyū	ushi	4
197	魚	fish	gyo	sakana	11
198	鳥	bird	chō	tori	11
199	羽	feather	u	ha, hane	6
200	鳴	chirp	mei	na-ku	14
201	麦	wheat	baku	mugi	7
202	米	rice	bei, mai	kome	6
203	茶	tea	cha, sa		9
204	色	colour	shoku	iro	6
205	黄	yellow	ō	ki	11
206	黒	black	koku	kuro	11
207	来	come	rai	ku-ru	7
208	行	go	kō, gyō	i-ku, yu-ku, okona-u	6
209	帰	return	ki	kae-ru	10
210	歩	walk	ho, fu, bu	aru-ku, ayu-mu	8
211	走	run	sō	hashi-ru	7
212	止	stop	shi	to-maru	4
213	活	active	katsu	i-kiru	9
214	店	store	ten	mise	8
215	買	buy	bai	ka-u	12
216	売	sell	bai	u-ru	7
217	午	noon	go	uma	4
218	汽	steam	ki		7
219	弓	bow	kyū	yumi	3
220	回	number of times, revolve	kai	mawa-ru	6
221	会	meet	kai, e	a-u	6
222	組	team	so	kumi	11
223	船	ship	sen	fune	11
224	明	bright	mei	aka-rui	8
225	社	company	sha	yashiro	7
226	切	cut	setsu	ki-ru	4
227	電	electricity	den	inazuma	13
228	毎	every	mai	goto	6
229	合	fit	gō	a-u	6
230	当	this, hit	tō	a-taru	6
231	台	pedestal	dai, tai		5
232	楽	music, pleasure	gaku, raku	tano-shii	13
233	公	public	kō	ōyake	4
234	引	pull	in	hi-ku	4
235	科	section, grade	ka		9
236	歌	song	ka	uta	14
237	刀	sword	tō	katana	2
238	番	number	ban		12
239	用	use	yō	mochi-iru	5
240	何	what	ka	nani, nan	7

=== Third grade (200 kanji) ===
#	Kanji	Meaning	On	Kun	Strokes
241	丁	street, district	chō	hinoto	2
242	世	generation	sei, se	yo	5
243	両	both	ryō	teru, futatsu	6
244	主	master, main	shu	nushi, omo	5
245	乗	ride	jō	no-ru	9
246	予	beforehand	yo	arakaji-me	4
247	事	intangible thing	ji	koto	8
248	仕	serve	shi	tsuka-eru	5
249	他	other	ta	hoka	5
250	代	era, substitute	dai, tai	ka-waru, yo	5
251	住	dwell	jū	su-mu	7
252	使	use	shi	tsuka-u	8
253	係	person in charge	kei	kakari, kaka-ru	9
254	倍	double	bai		10
255	全	whole	zen	matta-ku	6
256	具	tool	gu	sona-eru, tsubusa-ni	8
257	写	copy	sha	utsu-su	5
258	列	row	retsu		6
259	助	help	jo	tasu-keru	7
260	勉	diligence	ben	tsuto-meru	10
261	動	move	dō	ugo-ku	11
262	勝	win	shō	ka-tsu	12
263	化	change	ka	ba-keru	4
264	区	district	ku		4
265	医	doctor	i	iya-su, i-suru	7
266	去	leave	kyo, ko	sa-ru	5
267	反	anti-	han	so-ru	4
268	取	take	shu	to-ru	8
269	受	receive	ju	u-keru	8
270	号	number	gō	yobina, sake-bu	5
271	向	face	kō	mu-kau	6
272	君	you, monarch	kun	kimi	7
273	味	flavor	mi	aji, aji-wau	8
274	命	fate, life	mei	inochi	8
275	和	harmony, Japanese	wa	yawa-ragu, nago-yaka	8
276	品	article	hin	shina	9
277	員	employee	in		10
278	商	commerce	shō	akina-u	11
279	問	question	mon	to-u, ton	11
280	坂	slope	han	saka	7
281	央	center	ō		5
282	始	begin	shi	haji-meru	8
283	委	committee	i	yuda-neru	8
284	守	protect	shu	mamo-ru	6
285	安	cheap, calm	an	yasu-i	6
286	定	determine	tei, jō	sada-meru	8
287	実	fruit, realization	jitsu	mi, mino-ru	8
288	客	guest	kyaku		9
289	宮	Shinto shrine, prince	kyū, gū	miya	10
290	宿	inn	shuku	yado, yado-ru	11
291	寒	cold (weather)	kan	samu-i	12
292	対	opposite, against	tai, tsui	aite, soro-i	7
293	局	office	kyoku	tsubone	7
294	屋	roof	oku	ya	9
295	岸	shore	gan	kishi	8
296	島	island	tō	shima	10
297	州	state, province	shū	su	6
298	帳	notebook	chō	tobari	11
299	平	flat	hei, byō	tai-ra, hira	5
300	幸	happiness	kō	saiwa-i, shiawa-se	8
301	度	degrees	do	tabi	9
302	庫	warehouse	ko, ku	kura	10
303	庭	yard	tei	niwa	10
304	式	style, ceremony, numerical formula	shiki		6
305	役	role	yaku		7
306	待	wait	tai	ma-tsu	9
307	急	hurry	kyū	iso-gu	9
308	息	breath	soku	iki	10
309	悪	bad	aku	waru-i	11
310	悲	sad	hi	kana-shii	12
311	想	thought	sō		13
312	意	idea	i		13
313	感	feel	kan	kan-jiru	13
314	所	place	sho	tokoro	8
315	打	hit	da	u-tsu	5
316	投	throw	tō	na-geru	7
317	拾	pick up	shū	hiro-u	9
318	持	hold	ji	mo-tsu	9
319	指	finger, point	shi	yubi, sa-su	9
320	放	release	hō	hana-su	8
321	整	organize	sei	totono-eru	16
322	旅	trip	ryo	tabi	10
323	族	tribe	zoku		11
324	昔	long ago	seki, shaku	mukashi	8
325	昭	shine	shō		9
326	暑	hot	sho	atsu-i	12
327	暗	dark	an	kura-i	13
328	曲	melody, curve	kyoku	ma-garu	6
329	有	possess	yū	a-ru	6
330	服	clothes	fuku		8
331	期	period of time	ki		12
332	板	board	han, ban	ita	8
333	柱	pillar	chū	hashira	9
334	根	root	kon	ne	10
335	植	plant	shoku	u-eru	12
336	業	business	gyō		13
337	様	appearance	yō	sama	14
338	横	horizontal	ō	yoko	15
339	橋	bridge	kyō	hashi	16
340	次	next	ji	tsugi, tsu-gu	6
341	歯	tooth	shi	ha	12
342	死	death	shi	shi-nu	6
343	氷	ice	hyō	kōri	5
344	決	decide	ketsu	ki-meru	7
345	油	oil	yu	abura	8
346	波	wave	ha	nami	8
347	注	pour	chū	soso-gu	8
348	泳	swim	ei	oyo-gu	8
349	洋	ocean	yō		9
350	流	stream	ryū	naga-reru	10
351	消	extinguish	shō	ki-eru, ke-su	10
352	深	deep	shin	fuka-i	11
353	温	warm	on	atata-kai	12
354	港	harbor	kō	minato	12
355	湖	lake	ko	mizu'umi	12
356	湯	hot water	tō	yu	12
357	漢	Chinese	kan		13
358	炭	charcoal	tan	sumi	9
359	物	(tangible) thing	butsu, motsu	mono	8
360	球	sphere	kyū	tama	11
361	由	reason	yū, yu	yoshi	5
362	申	say	shin	mō-su	5
363	界	world	kai		9
364	畑	farm		hata, hatake	9
365	病	sick	byō	yamai	10
366	発	departure	hatsu		9
367	登	climb	tō, to	nobo-ru	12
368	皮	skin	hi	kawa	5
369	皿	dish	bei	sara	5
370	相	mutual	sō	ai	9
371	県	prefecture	ken	ka-keru	9
372	真	true	shin	ma	10
373	着	wear, arrive	chaku	ki-ru, tsu-ku	12
374	短	short	tan	mijika-i	12
375	研	sharpen	ken	to-gu	9
376	礼	manners	rei		5
377	神	deity	shin, jin	kami	9
378	祭	festival	sai	matsu-ri	11
379	福	luck	fuku		13
380	秒	second	byō		9
381	究	research	kyū	kiwa-meru	7
382	章	chapter	shō		11
383	童	juvenile	dō	warabe	12
384	笛	flute	teki	fue	11
385	第	ordinal	dai		11
386	筆	writing brush	hitsu	fude	12
387	等	class	tō	hito-shii	12
388	箱	box	sō	hako	15
389	級	rank	kyū		9
390	終	end	shū	o-waru, o-eru	11
391	緑	green	ryoku	midori	14
392	練	practice	ren	ne-ru	14
393	羊	sheep	yō	hitsuji	6
394	美	beauty	bi	utsuku-shii	9
395	習	learn	shū	nara-u	11
396	者	someone	sha	mono	8
397	育	raise	iku	soda-tsu	8
398	苦	suffer, bitter	ku	kuru-shii, niga-i	8
399	荷	luggage	ka	ni	10
400	落	fall	raku	o-chiru, o-tosu	12
401	葉	leaf	yō	ha	12
402	薬	medicine	yaku	kusuri	16
403	血	blood	ketsu	chi	6
404	表	express	hyō	omote, arawa-su	8
405	詩	poem	shi	uta	13
406	調	tone, find	chō	shira-beru	15
407	談	discuss	dan		15
408	豆	bean	tō, zu	mame	7
409	負	lose	fu	ma-keru, o-u	9
410	起	awaken	ki	o-kiru	10
411	路	path	ro	ji	13
412	身	body	shin	mi	7
413	転	to shift, fall down	ten	koro-bu	11
414	軽	lightweight	kei	karu-i	12
415	農	agriculture	nō		13
416	返	return	hen	kae-su	7
417	追	follow	tsui	o-u	9
418	送	send	sō	oku-ru	9
419	速	fast	soku	haya-i	10
420	進	progress	shin	susu-mu	11
421	遊	play	yū	aso-bu	12
422	運	carry	un	hako-bu	12
423	部	part	bu		11
424	都	metropolis	to, tsu	miyako	11
425	配	distribute	hai	kuba-ru	10
426	酒	liquor	shu	sake, saka	10
427	重	heavy, gravity, pile	jū, chō	omo-i, kasa-neru	9
428	鉄	iron	tetsu	kurogane	13
429	銀	silver	gin	shirogane	14
430	開	open	kai	hira-ku, a-ku	12
431	院	institution	in		10
432	陽	sun	yō	hi	12
433	階	storey	kai	kizahashi	12
434	集	gather	shū	atsu-maru	12
435	面	surface	men	omote, tsura	9
436	題	topic	dai		18
437	飲	drink	in	no-mu	12
438	館	public building	kan	tate	16
439	駅	station	eki		14
440	鼻	nose	bi	hana	14

=== Fourth grade (202 kanji) ===
#	Kanji	Meaning	On	Kun	Strokes
441	不	not	fu, bu		4
442	争	conflict	sō	araso-u	6
443	井	well	sei, shō	i, ido	4
444	付	attach	fu	tsu-ku	5
445	令	orders	rei		5
446	以	reference point	i		5
447	仲	relationship	chū	naka	6
448	伝	convey	den	tsuta-eru	6
449	位	rank	i	kurai	7
450	低	low	tei	hiku-i	7
451	佐	assist	sa	tasuke, tasukeru, suke	7
452	例	example	rei	tato-eru	8
453	便	facility, flight, mail	ben, bin	tayo-ri	9
454	信	trust	shin		9
455	倉	storage	sō	kura	10
456	候	climate	kō		10
457	借	borrow	shaku	ka-riru	10
458	健	healthy	ken	suko-yaka	11
459	側	side	soku	kawa	11
460	働	work	dō	hatara-ku	13
461	億	hundred million	oku		15
462	兆	portent, trillion	chō	kiza-shi	6
463	児	offspring	ji, ni	ko	7
464	共	together	kyō	tomo	6
465	兵	soldier	hei, hyō	tsuwamono	7
466	典	code	ten		8
467	冷	cool	rei	tsume-tai, hi-eru, sa-meru	7
468	初	first	sho	hatsu, haji-me	7
469	別	separate	betsu	waka-reru	7
470	利	profit	ri		7
471	刷	printing	satsu	su-ru	8
472	副	vice-	fuku		11
473	功	achievement	kō		5
474	加	add	ka	kuwa-eru	5
475	努	toil	do	tsuto-meru	7
476	労	labor	rō	negira-u	7
477	勇	courage	yū	isa-mu	9
478	包	wrap	hō	tsutsu-mu	5
479	卒	graduate	sotsu		8
480	協	cooperation	kyō		8
481	単	simple	tan		9
482	博	wide knowledge, Dr.	haku		12
483	印	mark	in	shirushi	6
484	参	participate	san	mai-ru	8
485	司	director	shi		5
486	各	each	kaku	ono-ono	6
487	周	circumference	shū	mawa-ri	8
488	唱	chant	shō	tona-eru	11
489	器	container	ki	utsuwa	15
490	固	harden	ko	kata-maru	8
491	城	castle	jō	shiro	9
492	埼	headland	ki	saki	11
493	塩	salt	en	shio	13
494	変	change, strange	hen	ka-waru	9
495	夫	husband	fu fū bu	otto	4
496	失	lose	shitsu	ushina-u	5
497	奈	but	na, dai	karanashi	8
498	好	like	kō	su-ku, kono-mu	6
499	媛	beauty	en	hime	12
500	季	seasons	ki		8
501	孫	grandchild	son	mago	10
502	完	perfect	kan		7
503	官	government official	kan		8
504	害	harm	gai		10
505	富	abundant	fu	tomi	12
506	察	guess	satsu		14
507	岐	high	ki, gi	edamichi	7
508	岡	hill	kō	oka	8
509	崎	rough	ki	saki, kewashii	11
510	巣	nest	sō	su	11
511	差	distinction	sa		10
512	希	hope	ki	mare	7
513	席	seat	seki		10
514	帯	sash	tai	obi	10
515	底	bottom	tei	soko	8
516	府	urban prefecture	fu		8
517	康	ease	kō		11
518	建	build	ken	ta-teru	9
519	径	diameter	kei		8
520	徒	junior	to		10
521	徳	virtue	toku		14
522	必	inevitable	hitsu	kanara-zu	5
523	念	thought	nen		8
524	愛	love	ai		13
525	成	become	sei	na-ru	6
526	戦	war	sen	ikusa, tataka-u	13
527	折	fold, break	setsu	o-ru	7
528	挙	raise	kyo	a-geru	10
529	改	reformation	kai	arata-meru	7
530	敗	break, failure	hai	yabu-reru	11
531	散	scatter	san	chi-ru	12
532	料	fee	ryō		10
533	旗	flag	ki	hata	14
534	昨	yesterday	saku		9
535	景	scenery	kei		12
536	最	superlative	sai	mo, motto-mo	12
537	望	hope	bō	nozo-mu	11
538	未	un-	mi	ima-da	5
539	末	end	matsu	sue	5
540	札	bill, plate, tag	satsu	fuda	5
541	材	lumber, material	zai		7
542	束	bundle	soku	taba, tsuka	7
543	松	pine	shō	matsu	8
544	果	accomplish, fruit	ka	ha-tasu	8
545	栃	horse chestnut		tochi	9
546	栄	prosperity	ei	saka-eru	9
547	案	plan	an		10
548	梅	plum	bai	ume	10
549	梨	pear	ri	nashi	11
550	械	contraption	kai		11
551	極	poles	kyoku	kiwa-meru	12
552	標	signpost	hyō		15
553	機	machine	ki	hata	16
554	欠	lack	ketsu	ka-keru	4
555	残	remainder, left	zan	noko-ru	10
556	氏	surname, Mr.	shi	uji	4
557	民	people	min	tami	5
558	求	request	kyū	moto-mu	7
559	沖	pour	chū	oki, waku	7
560	治	govern, heal	chi, ji	osa-meru, nao-ru	8
561	法	method	hō		8
562	泣	cry	kyū	na-ku	8
563	浅	shallow	sen	asa-i	9
564	浴	bathe, bask	yoku	a-biru	10
565	清	pure	sei, shō	kiyo-raka	11
566	満	full	man	mi-chiru	12
567	滋	grow	ji, shi	shigeru, masu, masumasu	12
568	漁	look for, fishing	ryō, gyo	asa-ru	14
569	潟	lagoon	seki	kata	15
570	灯	lamp	tō	hi	6
571	無	nothing	mu, bu	na-i	12
572	然	so, although	zen, nen	shika-shi	12
573	焼	bake	shō	ya-ku	12
574	照	illuminate	shō	te-rasu	13
575	熊	bear	yū	kuma	14
576	熱	heat	netsu	atsu-i	15
577	牧	pasture, breed	boku	maki	8
578	特	special	toku		10
579	産	give birth	san	u-mu	11
580	的	target	teki	mato	8
581	省	government ministry, omit, look back	shō, sei	habu-ku	9
582	祝	celebrate	shuku	iwa-u	9
583	票	ballot	hyō		11
584	種	species, seed	shu	tane	14
585	積	accumulate, pile	seki	tsu-mu	16
586	競	emulate	kyō	kiso-u	20
587	笑	laugh	shō	wara-u	10
588	管	pipe	kan	kuda	14
589	節	node	setsu	fushi	13
590	約	promise	yaku		9
591	結	tie	ketsu	musu-bu, yu-u	12
592	給	salary	kyū	tama-u	12
593	続	continue	zoku	tsuzu-ku	13
594	縄	rope	jō, bin, yō	nawa	15
595	置	put	chi	o-ku	13
596	老	old man	rō	o-iru	6
597	臣	retainer	shin		7
598	良	good	ryō	yo-i	7
599	芸	art	gei		7
600	芽	bud	ga	me	8
601	英	England	ei		8
602	茨	caltrop	shi, ji	ibara, kusabuki, kaya	9
603	菜	vegetable	sai	na	11
604	街	street, city	gai	machi	12
605	衣	garment	i	koromo	6
606	要	need	yō	i-ru	9
607	覚	memorize	kaku	obo-eru, sa-meru	12
608	観	observe	kan	mi-ru	18
609	訓	instruction	kun		10
610	試	test	shi	kokoro-miru, tame-su	13
611	説	theory	setsu	to-ku	14
612	課	section	ka		15
613	議	deliberation	gi		20
614	貨	currency, cargo	ka		11
615	賀	congratulations	ga		12
616	軍	army	gun		9
617	輪	wheel	rin	wa	15
618	辞	resign, speech, encyclopedia	ji	kotoba, ya-meru	13
619	辺	edge, vicinity	hen	ata-ri	5
620	連	take along	ren	tsu-reru, tsura-neru	10
621	達	attain	tatsu	tachi	12
622	選	choose	sen	era-bu	15
623	郡	county	gun		10
624	群	flock	gun	mu-reru	13
625	量	quantity	ryō		12
626	録	transcript	roku		16
627	鏡	mirror	kyō	kagami	19
628	関	related	kan	seki	14
629	阜	mound	fu	oka	8
630	阪	heights/slope	han	saka	6
631	陸	land	riku		11
632	隊	squad	tai		12
633	静	quiet	sei	shizu-ka	14
634	順	obey	jun		12
635	願	request	gan	nega-u	19
636	類	sort	rui		18
637	飛	fly	hi	to-bu	9
638	飯	meal	han	meshi	12
639	養	foster	yō	yashina-u	15
640	香	fragrant	kō, kyō	kaori, ka	9
641	験	verify	ken		18
642	鹿	deer	roku	shika, ka	11

=== Fifth grade (193 kanji) ===
#	Kanji	Meaning	On	Kun	Strokes
643	久	long time	kyū	hisa	3
644	仏	Buddha	futsu, butsu	hotoke	4
645	仮	sham	ka, ke	kari	6
646	件	affair	ken		6
647	任	responsibility	nin	maka-seru	6
648	似	resemble	ji	ni-ru	7
649	余	surplus	yo	ama-ru	7
650	価	value	ka	atai	8
651	保	preserve	ho	tamo-tsu	9
652	修	discipline	shū	osa-meru	10
653	個	individual	ko		10
654	停	halt	tei	to-maru, to-meru	11
655	備	provide	bi	sona-eru	12
656	像	statue	zō		14
657	再	again	sai, sa	futata-bi	6
658	刊	publish	kan		5
659	判	judge	han	waka-ru	7
660	制	control	sei		8
661	則	rule	soku	notto-ru	9
662	効	effect	kō	ki-ku	8
663	務	duty	mu	tsuto-meru	11
664	勢	energy	sei	ikio-i	13
665	厚	thick	kō	atsu-i	9
666	句	phrase	ku		5
667	可	possible	ka		5
668	史	history	shi		5
669	告	tell	koku	tsu-geru	7
670	喜	rejoice, joy	ki	yoroko-bu	12
671	営	manage	ei	itona-mu	12
672	因	cause	in	yo-ru	6
673	団	association	dan, ton		6
674	囲	surround	i	kako-u	7
675	圧	pressure	atsu		5
676	在	exist	zai	a-ru	6
677	均	level	kin		7
678	型	model	kei	kata	9
679	基	foundation	ki	moto-zuku	11
680	堂	public chamber	dō		11
681	報	report	hō	muku-iru	12
682	境	boundary	kyō	sakai	14
683	墓	grave	bo	haka	13
684	増	increase	zō	ma-su, fu-eru	14
685	士	gentleman	shi		3
686	夢	dream	mu	yume	13
687	妻	wife	sai	tsuma	8
688	婦	lady	fu		11
689	容	contain	yō		10
690	寄	approach	ki	yo-ru	11
691	導	guide	dō	michibi-ku	15
692	居	reside	kyo	i-ru	8
693	属	belong	zoku		12
694	布	linen	fu	nuno	5
695	師	expert	shi		10
696	常	normal	jō	tsune	11
697	幹	tree trunk	kan	miki	13
698	序	preface	jo		7
699	弁	valve	ben		5
700	張	stretch	chō	ha-ru	11
701	往	journey	ō		8
702	得	acquire	toku	e-ru	11
703	復	recovery	fuku		12
704	志	intention	shi	kokorozashi	7
705	応	respond	ō		7
706	快	cheerful	kai	kokoroyo-i	7
707	性	gender	sei, shō	saga	8
708	情	feelings	jō	nasa-ke	11
709	態	condition	tai		14
710	慣	accustomed	kan	na-reru	14
711	技	skill	gi	waza	7
712	招	beckon	shō	mane-ku	8
713	授	instruct	ju	sazu-keru	11
714	採	pick	sai	to-ru	11
715	接	contact	setsu	tsu-gu	11
716	提	propose	tei	sa-geru	12
717	損	loss	son	soko-neru	13
718	支	support	shi	sasa-eru	4
719	政	politics	sei	matsurigoto	9
720	故	circumstances	ko	yue	9
721	救	salvation	kyū	suku-u	11
722	断	decline, refuse	dan	kotowa-ru	11
723	旧	old times	kyū		5
724	易	easy	eki	yasa-shii	8
725	暴	outburst	bō	aba-ku	15
726	条	clause	jō	kudari	7
727	枝	branch	shi	eda	8
728	査	investigate	sa		9
729	格	status	kaku		10
730	桜	cherry	ō	sakura	10
731	検	examine	ken		12
732	構	construct	kō	kama-eru	14
733	武	military	bu, mu		8
734	歴	curriculum	reki		14
735	殺	kill	satsu	koro-su	10
736	毒	poison	doku		8
737	比	compare	hi	kura-beru	4
738	永	eternity	ei	naga-i	5
739	河	stream	ka	kawa	8
740	液	fluid	eki		11
741	混	mix	kon	ma-zeru	11
742	減	decrease	gen	he-ru	12
743	測	measure	soku	haka-ru	12
744	準	standard	jun		13
745	演	perform	en		14
746	潔	undefiled	ketsu	isagiyo-i	15
747	災	disaster	sai	wazawa-i	7
748	燃	burn	nen	mo-eru	16
749	版	printing block	han		8
750	犯	crime	han	oka-su	5
751	状	form	jō		7
752	独	alone	doku	hito-ri	9
753	率	rate	ritsu, sotsu	hiki-iru	11
754	現	appear	gen	arawa-reru	11
755	留	detain	ryū, ru	todo-maru	10
756	略	abbreviation	ryaku		11
757	益	benefit	eki		10
758	眼	eyeball	gan	me	11
759	破	rend	ha	yabu-ru	10
760	確	certain	kaku	tashi-ka	15
761	示	indicate	shi	shime-su	5
762	祖	ancestor	so		9
763	禁	prohibition	kin		13
764	移	shift	i	utsu-ru	11
765	程	extent	tei	hodo	12
766	税	tax	zei		12
767	築	fabricate	chiku	kizu-ku	16
768	粉	flour	fun	ko, kona	10
769	精	refined	sei		14
770	紀	chronicle	ki		9
771	素	elementary	su, so	moto	10
772	経	manage	kei, kyō	he-ru	11
773	統	relationship	tō	su-beru	12
774	絶	discontinue	zetsu	ta-tsu	12
775	綿	cotton	men	wata	14
776	総	whole	sō		14
777	編	compile	hen	a-mu	15
778	績	exploits	seki		17
779	織	weave	shiki	o-ru	18
780	罪	guilt	zai	tsumi	13
781	義	righteousness	gi		13
782	耕	till	kō	tagaya-su	10
783	職	employment	shoku		18
784	肥	fertilizer	hi	ko-yasu	8
785	能	ability	nō		10
786	脈	vein	myaku		10
787	興	entertain	kyō	oko-su	16
788	舎	cottage	sha		8
789	航	cruise	kō		10
790	術	art	jutsu	sube	11
791	衛	defense	ei		16
792	製	manufacture	sei		14
793	複	duplicate	fuku		14
794	規	rule	ki		11
795	解	untie	ge, kai	to-ku	13
796	設	establish	setsu	mō-keru	11
797	許	permit	kyo	yuru-su	11
798	証	evidence	shō	akashi	12
799	評	evaluate	hyō		12
800	講	lecture	kō		17
801	謝	apologize	sha	ayama-ru	17
802	識	discriminating	shiki		19
803	護	safeguard	go	mamo-ru	20
804	豊	bountiful	hō	yuta-ka	13
805	象	elephant, figure	zō, shō		12
806	財	wealth	zai		10
807	貧	poor	hin	mazu-shii	11
808	責	blame	seki	se-meru	11
809	貯	savings	cho	ta-meru	12
810	貸	lend	tai	ka-su	12
811	費	expense	hi	tsui-yasu	12
812	貿	trade	bō		12
813	資	resources	shi		13
814	賛	approve	san		15
815	賞	prize	shō		15
816	質	quality	shitsu		15
817	輸	transport	yu		16
818	述	state, express	jutsu	no-beru	8
819	迷	astray	mei	mayo-u	9
820	逆	inverted	gyaku	saka-rau	9
821	造	create	zō	tsuku-ru	10
822	過	pass, exceed	ka	sugi-ru	12
823	適	suitable	teki		14
824	酸	acid	san		14
825	鉱	mineral	kō		13
826	銅	copper	dō		14
827	防	prevent	bō	fuse-gu	7
828	限	limit	gen	kagi-ru	9
829	険	precipitous	ken	kewa-shii	11
830	際	occasion	sai	kiwa	14
831	雑	miscellaneous	zatsu		14
832	非	negative	hi	ara-zu	8
833	領	territory	ryō		14
834	額	amount	gaku	hitai	18
835	飼	domesticate	shi	ka-u	13

=== Sixth grade (191 kanji) ===
#	Kanji	Meaning	On	Kun	Strokes
836	並	row	hei	nami, nara-bu	8
837	乱	chaos	ran	mida-reru	7
838	乳	milk	nyū	chichi	8
839	亡	deceased	bō	na-kunaru	3
840	仁	kindness	jin		4
841	供	offer	kyō, ku	tomo	8
842	俳	actor	hai		10
843	俵	straw bag	hyō	tawara	10
844	値	value	chi	atai	10
845	傷	wound	shō	kizu	13
846	優	superior	yū	yasa-shii	17
847	党	political party	tō		10
848	冊	counter for books	satsu		5
849	処	dispose	sho		5
850	券	ticket	ken		8
851	刻	engrave	koku	kiza-mu	8
852	割	divide	katsu	wa-ru	12
853	創	create	sō	tsuku-ru	12
854	劇	drama	geki		15
855	勤	diligence	kin	tsuto-meru	12
856	危	dangerous	ki	abu-nai	6
857	卵	egg	ran	tamago	7
858	厳	strict	gen	kibi-shii	17
859	収	obtain	shū	osa-meru	4
860	后	queen	kō, gō	kisaki	6
861	否	negate	hi	ina, iya	7
862	吸	suck	kyū	su-u	6
863	呼	call	ko	yo-bu	8
864	善	virtue	zen	yo-i	12
865	困	quandary	kon	koma-ru	7
866	垂	droop	sui	ta-reru	8
867	域	range	iki		11
868	奏	play music	sō	kana-deru	9
869	奮	stirred up	fun	furu-u	16
870	姿	shape	shi	sugata	9
871	存	suppose	son		6
872	孝	filial piety	kō		7
873	宅	home	taku	ie	6
874	宇	eaves	u		6
875	宗	religion	shū	sō	8
876	宙	mid-air	chū		8
877	宝	treasure	hō	takara	8
878	宣	proclaim	sen	notama-u	9
879	密	secrecy	mitsu		11
880	寸	measurement	sun		3
881	専	specialty	sen	moppa-ra	9
882	射	shoot	sha	i-ru	10
883	将	leader	shō		10
884	尊	revered	son	tōto-bu	12
885	就	concerning	shū	tsu-ku	12
886	尺	measure of length	shaku		4
887	届	deliver	kai	todo-ku	8
888	展	expand	ten		10
889	層	stratum	sō		14
890	己	self	ko	onore	3
891	巻	scroll	kan	maki	9
892	幕	curtain	maku, baku		13
893	干	dry	kan	ho-su	3
894	幼	infancy	yō	osana-i	5
895	庁	government office	chō		5
896	座	sit	za	suwa-ru	10
897	延	prolong	en	no-basu	8
898	律	rhythm	ritsu		9
899	従	obey	jū	shitaga-u	10
900	忘	forget	bō	wasu-reru	7
901	忠	loyalty	chū		8
902	恩	grace	on		10
903	憲	constitution	ken		16
904	我	ego	ga	ware	7
905	批	criticism	hi		7
906	承	acquiesce	shō, jō	uketamawa-ru	8
907	担	shouldering	tan	nina-u	8
908	拝	worship	hai	oga-mu	8
909	拡	broaden	kaku	hiro-geru	8
910	捨	discard	sha	su-teru	11
911	探	look for, search	tan	saga-su	11
912	推	infer	sui		11
913	揮	brandish	ki		12
914	操	maneuver	sō	ayatsu-ru	16
915	敬	respect	kei	uyama-u	12
916	敵	enemy	teki	kataki	15
917	映	reflect	ei	utsu-ru	9
918	晩	nightfall	ban		12
919	暖	warmth	dan	atata-kai	13
920	暮	livelihood	bo	ku-rasu	14
921	朗	melodious	rō	hoga-raka	10
922	机	desk	ki	tsukue	6
923	枚	sheet of...	mai		8
924	染	dye	sen	so-meru	9
925	株	stocks	shu	kabu	10
926	棒	rod	bō		12
927	模	imitation	mo, bo		14
928	権	rights	ken		15
929	樹	trees	ju	ki	16
930	欲	longing	yoku	ho-shii	11
931	段	steps	dan		9
932	沿	run alongside	en	so-u	8
933	泉	fountain	sen	izumi	9
934	洗	wash	sen	ara-u	9
935	派	sect	ha		9
936	済	settle	sai	su-mu	11
937	源	source	gen	minamoto	13
938	潮	tide	chō	shio	15
939	激	violent	geki	hage-shii	16
940	灰	ashes	kai	hai	6
941	熟	ripen	juku	u-reru	15
942	片	one-sided	hen	kata	4
943	班	corps	han		10
944	異	uncommon	i	koto-naru	11
945	疑	doubt	gi	utaga-u	14
946	痛	pain	tsū	ita-i	12
947	皇	emperor	kō, ō		9
948	盛	prosper	sei	mo-ru	11
949	盟	alliance	mei		13
950	看	watch over	kan		9
951	砂	sand	sa, sha	suna	9
952	磁	magnet	ji		14
953	私	me	shi	watakushi, watashi	7
954	秘	secret	hi	hi-meru	10
955	穀	cereal	koku		14
956	穴	hole	ketsu	ana	5
957	窓	window	sō	mado	11
958	筋	muscle	kin	suji	12
959	策	scheme	saku		12
960	簡	simplicity	kan		18
961	糖	sugar	tō		16
962	系	lineage	kei		7
963	紅	crimson	kō	beni, kurenai	9
964	納	settlement	nō	osa-meru	10
965	純	genuine	jun		10
966	絹	silk	ken	kinu	13
967	縦	vertical	jū	tate	16
968	縮	shrink	shuku	chidi-mu	17
969	署	government office	sho		13
970	翌	forthcoming	yoku		11
971	聖	holy	sei		13
972	肺	lung	hai		9
973	胃	stomach	i		9
974	背	back	hai	se	9
975	胸	chest, breast	kyō	mune	10
976	脳	brain	nō		11
977	腸	intestines	chō	harawata	13
978	腹	abdomen	fuku	hara	13
979	臓	entrails	zō		19
980	臨	lookover	rin	nozo-mu	18
981	至	climax	shi	ita-ru	6
982	舌	tongue	zetsu	shita	6
983	若	young	jaku	waka-i	8
984	著	renowned	cho	arawa-su, ichijiru-shii	11
985	蒸	foment	jō	mu-su	13
986	蔵	storehouse	zō	kura	15
987	蚕	silkworm	san	kaiko	10
988	衆	masses	shū		12
989	裁	judge	sai	saba-ku	12
990	装	attire	sō, shō	yosoo-u	12
991	裏	rear	ri	ura	13
992	補	supplement	ho	ogina-u	12
993	視	look at	shi	mi-ru	11
994	覧	perusal	ran		17
995	討	chastise	tō	u-tsu	10
996	訪	visit	hō	tazu-neru	11
997	訳	translate, reason	yaku	wake	11
998	詞	term	shi	kotoba	12
999	誌	document	shi		14
1000	認	recognize	nin	mito-meru	14
1001	誕	born	tan		15
1002	誠	sincerity	sei	makoto	13
1003	誤	mistake	go	ayama-ru	14
1004	論	argument, discussion	ron		15
1005	諸	various	sho	moro	15
1006	警	admonish	kei	imashi-meru	19
1007	貴	precious	ki	tatto-i	12
1008	賃	fare	chin		13
1009	退	retreat	tai	shirizo-ku	9
1010	遺	bequeath	i		15
1011	郵	mail	yū		11
1012	郷	home town	kyō	gō	11
1013	針	needle	shin	hari	10
1014	銭	coin	sen	zeni	14
1015	鋼	steel	kō	hagane	16
1016	閉	closed	hei	shi-meru	11
1017	閣	tower	kaku		14
1018	降	descend	kō	o-riru	10
1019	陛	majesty	hei		10
1020	除	exclude	jo, ji	nozo-ku	10
1021	障	hurt	shō	sawa-ru	14
1022	難	difficult	nan	muzuka-shii	18
1023	革	leather	kaku	kawa	9
1024	頂	top, receive	chō	itada-ku	11
1025	預	deposit	yo	azu-keru	13
1026	骨	bone	kotsu	hone	10

== List by radicals ==
Radical number	Radical	Count of kanji	List of kanji
1	⼀	11	一丁七万三上下不世両並
2	⼁	1	中
3	⼂	2	丸主
4	⼃	2	久乗
5	⼄	3	九乱乳
6	⼅	3	予争事
7	⼆	3	二五井
8	⼇	3	亡交京
9	⼈	52	人仁今仏仕他付代令以仮仲件任休会伝似位低住佐体何余作使例供価便係保信修俳俵倉個倍候借値停健側備傷働像億優
10	⼉	7	元兄兆先光児党
11	⼊	3	入内全
12	⼋	7	八公六共兵具典
13	⼌	3	円冊再
14	⼍	1	写
15	⼎	2	冬冷
16	⼏	0	
17	⼐	1	出
18	⼑	19	刀分切刊列初判別利制刷券刻則前副割創劇
19	⼒	14	力功加助努労効勇勉動務勝勢勤
20	⼓	1	包
21	⼔	2	化北
22	⼕	0	
23	⼖	2	区医
24	⼗	9	十千午半卒協南単博
25	⼘	0	
26	⼙	4	印危卵巻
27	⼚	3	厚原厳
28	⼛	2	去参
29	⼜	5	友反収取受
30	⼝	32	口古句可台史右号司各合同名后向君否吸告周味呼命和品員唱商問善喜器
31	⼞	10	四回因団困囲図固国園
32	⼟	19	土圧在地坂均垂型城域基埼堂報場塩境墓増
33	⼠	3	士声売
34	⼡	1	処
35	⼢	2	変夏
36	⼣	5	夕外多夜夢
37	⼤	9	大天太夫央失奈奏奮
38	⼥	10	女好妹妻姉始委姿婦媛
39	⼦	7	子字存孝季学孫
40	⼧	24	宅宇守安完宗官宙定宝実客宣室宮害家容宿寄密富寒察
41	⼨	7	寸寺対専射尊導
42	⼩	4	小少当営
43	⼪	1	就
44	⼫	9	尺局居届屋昼展属層
45	⼬	0	
46	⼭	7	山岐岡岩岸島崎
47	⼮	3	川州巣
48	⼯	3	工左差
49	⼰	1	己
50	⼱	10	市布希師席帯帰帳常幕
51	⼲	5	干平年幸幹
52	⼳	1	幼
53	⼴	11	庁広序底店府度座庫庭康
54	⼵	2	延建
55	⼶	1	弁
56	⼷	1	式
57	⼸	6	弓引弟弱張強
58	⼹	0	
59	⼺	1	形
60	⼻	11	役往径待律後徒従得復徳
61	⼼	23	心必志忘応忠快念思急性恩息悪悲情想意愛感態慣憲
62	⼽	3	成我戦
63	⼾	2	戸所
64	⼿	26	手才打批承技投折担招拝拡拾持指挙捨授採探接推提揮損操
65	⽀	1	支
66	⽁	12	改放政故救敗教散敬数整敵
67	⽂	1	文
68	⽃	1	料
69	⽄	2	断新
70	⽅	4	方旅族旗
71	⽆	0	
72	⽇	21	日旧早明易昔星映春昨昭時晩景晴暑暖暗暮暴曜
73	⽈	3	曲書最
74	⽉	7	月有服朗望朝期
75	⽊	48	木未末本札机材村束条来東松板林枚果枝染柱査栃栄校株根格案桜梅梨械棒森植検業極楽構様標模権横樹橋機
76	⽋	4	欠次欲歌
77	⽌	5	止正武歩歴
78	⽍	2	死残
79	⽎	2	段殺
80	⽏	3	母毎毒
81	⽐	1	比
82	⽑	1	毛
83	⽒	2	氏民
84	⽓	1	気
85	⽔	49	水氷永求池決汽沖河油治沿泉法波泣注泳浅洋洗活派流浴海消液深混清済減温測港湖湯満源準滋漁演漢潔潟潮激
86	⽕	15	火灯灰災炭点畑無然焼照熊熟熱燃
87	⽖	0	
88	⽗	1	父
89	⽘	0	
90	⽙	1	将
91	⽚	2	片版
92	⽛	0	
93	⽜	4	牛牧物特
94	⽝	4	犬犯状独
95	⽞	1	率
96	⽟	6	王玉班現球理
97	⽠	0	
98	⽡	0	
99	⽢	0	
100	⽣	2	生産
101	⽤	1	用
102	⽥	11	田由申男町画界留略番異
103	⽦	1	疑
104	⽧	2	病痛
105	⽨	2	発登
106	⽩	4	白百的皇
107	⽪	1	皮
108	⽫	4	皿益盛盟
109	⽬	9	目直相省看県真眼着
110	⽭	0	
111	⽮	3	矢知短
112	⽯	6	石砂破研確磁
113	⽰	10	示礼社祖祝神票祭禁福
114	⽱	0	
115	⽲	11	私秋科秒秘移程税種穀積
116	⽳	4	穴究空窓
117	⽴	4	立章童競
118	⽵	15	竹笑笛第筆等筋答策節算管箱築簡
119	⽶	4	米粉精糖
120	⽷	32	糸系紀約紅納純紙級素細終組経結給統絵絶絹続綿総緑線編練縄縦縮績織
121	⽸	0	
122	⽹	3	罪置署
123	⽺	4	羊美群義
124	⽻	3	羽翌習
125	⽼	3	老考者
126	⽽	0	
127	⽾	1	耕
128	⽿	4	耳聖聞職
129	⾀	0	
130	⾁	13	肉肥育肺胃背胸能脈脳腸腹臓
131	⾂	2	臣臨
132	⾃	1	自
133	⾄	1	至
134	⾅	1	興
135	⾆	3	舌舎辞
136	⾇	0	
137	⾈	2	航船
138	⾉	1	良
139	⾊	1	色
140	⾋	17	花芸芽若苦英茨茶草荷菜著落葉蒸蔵薬
141	⾌	0	
142	⾍	2	虫蚕
143	⾎	2	血衆
144	⾏	4	行術街衛
145	⾐	8	衣表裁装裏補製複
146	⾑	2	西要
147	⾒	7	見規視覚覧親観
148	⾓	2	角解
149	⾔	34	言計討訓記訪設許訳証評詞試詩話誌認誕語誠誤説読課調談論諸講謝識警議護
150	⾕	1	谷
151	⾖	2	豆豊
152	⾗	1	象
153	⾘	0	
154	⾙	18	貝負財貧貨責貯貴買貸費貿賀賃資賛賞質
155	⾚	1	赤
156	⾛	2	走起
157	⾜	2	足路
158	⾝	1	身
159	⾞	6	車軍転軽輪輸
160	⾟	0	
161	⾠	1	農
162	⾡	24	辺近返述迷追退送逆通速造連週進遊運過道達遠適選遺
163	⾢	5	郡部郵郷都
164	⾣	3	配酒酸
165	⾤	0	
166	⾥	4	里重野量
167	⾦	10	金針鉄鉱銀銅銭鋼録鏡
168	⾧	1	長
169	⾨	6	門閉開間関閣
170	⾩	15	阜阪防降限陛院除陸険陽隊階際障
171	⾪	0	
172	⾫	3	集雑難
173	⾬	4	雨雪雲電
174	⾭	2	青静
175	⾮	1	非
176	⾯	1	面
177	⾰	1	革
178	⾱	0	
179	⾲	0	
180	⾳	1	音
181	⾴	10	頂順預領頭題額顔願類
182	⾵	1	風
183	⾶	1	飛
184	⾷	6	食飯飲飼養館
185	⾸	1	首
186	⾹	1	香
187	⾺	3	馬駅験
188	⾻	1	骨
189	⾼	1	高
190	⾽	0	
191	⾾	0	
192	⾿	0	
193	⿀	0	
194	⿁	0	
195	⿂	1	魚
196	⿃	2	鳥鳴
197	⿄	0	
198	⿅	1	鹿
199	⿆	1	麦
200	⿇	0	
201	⿈	1	黄
202	⿉	0	
203	⿊	1	黒
204	⿋	0	
205	⿌	0	
206	⿍	0	
207	⿎	0	
208	⿏	0	
209	⿐	1	鼻
210	⿑	0	
211	⿒	1	歯
212	⿓	0	
213	⿔	0	
214	⿕	0	

== List by number of strokes ==
Number of strokes	Count of kanji	List of kanji
1	1	一
2	10	丁七九二人入八刀力十
3	24	万三上下丸久亡千口土士夕大女子寸小山川工己干弓才
4	48	不中予五井仁今仏元公六内円分切化区午友反収天太夫少尺引心戸手支文方日月木欠止比毛氏水火父片牛犬王
5	73	以世主仕他付代令兄冊写冬処出刊功加包北半印去古句可台史右号司四圧外央失左市布平幼庁広弁必打旧未末本札正母民氷永犯玉生用田由申白皮皿目矢石示礼穴立辺
6	78	両争交仮仲件任休会伝似兆先光全共再列危各合同名后向吸回因団在地多好字存宅宇守安寺州年式当成早曲有机次死毎気池灯灰百竹米糸羊羽老考耳肉臣自至舌色虫血行衣西阪防
7	88	乱位低住佐体何余作児兵冷初判別利助努労医卵君否告困囲図坂均声売姉孝完対局岐希序弟形役志忘応快我批技投折改材村束条来求決汽沖災状男町社私究系良花芸芽見角言谷豆貝赤走足身車近返里麦
8	114	並乳事京使例供価具典制刷券刻効卒協参取受周味呼命和固国垂夜奈妹妻始委季学宗官宙定宝実居届岡岩岸幸底店府延建往径忠念性所承担招拝拡放明易昔服東松板林枚果枝武歩河油治沿法波泣注泳浅版牧物画的直知空者肥育肺舎若苦英表述金長門阜限雨青非
9	109	乗便係保信修則前勇勉南単厚品型城変奏姿客宣室専将屋差巻度庭待律後思急拾持指政故星映春昨昭昼染柱査栃栄残段毒泉洋洗活派炭点独界畑発皇相省看県砂研祖祝神秋科秒紀約紅級美胃背茨茶草要計負軍迷追退送逆郡重陛院除面革音風飛食首香
10	93	俳俵倉個倍候借値健党務原員夏孫宮害家容射展島師席帯帰座庫弱徒従恩息挙料旅時書朗校株根格案桜殺流浴海消特班留病益真破秘笑粉納純紙素耕胸能脈航荷蚕討訓記財起通速造連部郵郷都配酒針降陸険馬骨高
11	101	停側副動唱商問営域基埼堂婦宿寄密崎巣帳常康張強得悪情捨授採探接推救敗教断族望梅梨械欲液深混清済率現球理産略異盛眼着票祭移窓章笛第細終組経翌習脳船菜著術規視訪設許訳象貧貨責転週進過野閉陽隊階雪頂魚鳥鹿黄黒
12	93	備割創勝博善喜報場媛富寒尊就属復悲提揮散敬晩景晴暑最朝期棒森植検極歯減温測港湖湯満滋無然焼番痛登短程税童筆等筋答策結給統絵絶落葉衆街裁装補覚証評詞貯貴買貸費貿賀軽遊運道達量開間集雲順飯飲
13	61	傷働像勢勤園塩墓夢幕幹想意愛感戦損数新暖暗業楽源準照盟禁福節絹続罪置署群義聖腸腹蒸裏解試詩話誠豊賃資路辞農遠鉄鉱際障電預飼
14	50	境増察徳態慣旗暮構様模歌歴漁演漢熊疑磁種算管精綿総緑聞蔵製複誌認語誤説読適酸銀銅銭関閣雑静領養駅鳴鼻
15	34	億劇導層敵暴標権横潔潟潮熟熱確穀箱線編練縄衛誕課調談論諸賛賞質輪選遺
16	24	厳器奮憲操整樹橋機激燃積築糖縦興薬覧親輸鋼録頭館
17	6	優縮績臨講謝
18	10	曜簡織職臓観題額顔験
19	6	識警鏡難願類
20	3	競議護

== List by Unicode code point ==
一丁七万三上下不世両並中丸主久乗九乱乳予争事二五井亞亡交京人仁今仏仕他付代令以仮仲件任休会伝似位低住佐体何余作使例供価便係保信修俳俵倉個倍候借値停健側備傷働像億優元兄兆先光児党入全八公六共兵具典内円冊再写冬冷処出刀分切刊列初判別利制刷券刻則前副割創劇力功加助努労効勇勉動務勝勢勤包化北区医十千午半卒協南単博印危卵厚原厳去参友反収取受口古句可台史右号司各合同名后向君否吸告周味呼命和品員唱商問善喜営器四回因団困囲図固国園土圧在地坂均垂型城域基埼堂報場塩境墓増士声売変夏夕外多夜夢大天太夫央失奈奏奮女好妹妻姉始委姿婦媛子字存孝季学孫宅宇守安完宗官宙定宝実客宣室宮害家容宿寄密富寒察寸寺対専射将尊導小少就尺局居届屋展属層山岐岡岩岸島崎川州巣工左差己巻市布希師席帯帰帳常幕干平年幸幹幼庁広序底店府度座庫庭康延建弁式弓引弟弱張強当形役往径待律後徒従得復徳心必志忘応忠快念思急性恩息悪悲情想意愛感態慣憲成我戦戸所雨手才打批両承技投折担招拝拡拾持指挙捨授採探接推提揮損操支改放政故救敗教散敬数整敵文料断新方旅族旗日旧早明易昔星映春昨昭昼時晩景晴暑暖暗暮暴曜曲書最月有服朗望朝期木未末本札机材村束条来東松板林枚果枝染柱査栃栄校株根格案桜梅梨械棒森植検業極楽構様標模権横樹橋機欠次欲歌止正武歩歯歴死残段殺母毎毒比毛氏民気水氷永求池決汽沖河油治沿泉法波泣注泳洋洗活派流浅浴海消液深混清済減温測港湖湯満源準滋漁演漢潔潟潮激火灯灰災炭点無然焼照熊熟熱燃父片版牛牧物特犬犯状独率玉王班現球理生産用田由申男町画界畑留略番異疑病痛発登白百的皇皮皿益盛盟目直相省看県真眼着矢知短石砂研破確磁示礼社祖祝神票祭禁福私秋科秒秘移程税種穀積穴究空窓立章童競竹笑笛第筆等筋答策算管箱節築簡米粉精糖糸系紀約紅納純紙級素細終組経結給統絵絶絹続綿総緑線編練縄縦縮績織罪置署羊美群義羽翌習老考者耕耳聖聞職肉肥育肺胃背胸能脈脳腸腹臓臣臨自至興舌舎航船良色花芸芽若苦英茨茶草荷菜落葉著蒸蔵薬虫蚕血衆行術街衛衣表裁装裏補製複西要見規視覚覧親観角解言計討訓記訪設許訳証評詞試詩話誌認誕語誠誤説読課調談論諸講謝識警議護谷豆豊象貝負財貧貨責貯貴買貸費貿賀賃資賛賞質赤走起足路身車軍転軽輪輸辞農辺近返述迷追退送逆通速造連週進遊運過道達遠適選遺郡部郵郷都配酒酸里重野量金針鉄鉱銀銅銭鋼録鏡長門閉開間関閣阜阪防降限陛院除陸険陽隊階際障集雑難雨雪雲電青静非面革音頂順預領頭題額顔願類風飛食飯飲飼養館首香馬駅験骨高魚鳥鳴鹿麦黄黒鼻

== List by frequency ==
日人一大年本中出時行事分会上生国者合自間方見手前場月子地学後入目部長発同新高社的作内動下用代言立定理明体業度通気関対家力表当金実全思物最外話現書名小意性市成来連今文回開法以戦所化女記主問三道不世取要多知機二野数第持教山心相画使集経正選報民考先期近情員利加面点水無在変次公初決安原品結解政東活語題保特信向車別私受平界海重引議付続真能元強田都組感電調指制少身和治何校男産口有説十楽示切約円県直確番川送交際空進得神売件務勝権食設運認必参位過町式置料流広北天可論共五支果氏終味計線聞死店始村万反島常木様半投状容放院予格着土住美屋台四応区判形転団基朝総白音役係工葉由西足他改伝軍止風起質仕配育張告資術声好親構頭府落優供士京済八義求検然石打価門再良乗局任古種光観注営映両限想帰読夫色号残態案達職追字存写演断査米愛南急消命提側統商球科建備首族条登研象呼早千九太図病路造悪馬技協個害念待収例増去各護官等派究規夜験館歩非細母像型割器返難試室証歌史録戸客助単視勢医素比火移党識準師花失段王域武量争満除福六井差製宮降類州殺若歴百編望守買独周園値負英評処系右七銀深横談防走接速管兵座策根境父異黒友復程率申衛青末警赤展働答領笑顔左挙松鉄算紙毎減察修導低辺駅退覚費春景帯疑旅極宅完版未曲担階週省専賞装著材寄飛姿補効労谷隊習農橋株具居委源船久述整将城財夏席願児精競故健佐興織絶波適積熱紀級革秋敗薬破標休苦囲温節岡洋税森背芸便遠険庫幸宿蔵巻探額星裁許司富授軽激推並従午遺香血順課林給板略訪雑陸角寺港留丸印玉君志短属静崎模豊遊服因清余河圧酒拡康障息列危密盛皇街照冷講飲央肉章逆刻喜責老泉草散我布旧絵輪裏庭衆昨植焼養訳博劇妻曜候針夢婦罪亡阪諸築練善創鳥仲堂幹茶似就雨徒航討承典岩誌禁採乱否令測油傷厳固犯岸忘輸幕陽納欲宇複筆辞徳困則永痛秘池筋宗札貴延益里簡停枚倍己脳羽昭勤敵票染暴片刊混易季底功坂群祭希折射夕閉快暮層厚億樹竹欠暗弱閣庁奈倉卒雪弟毛批宣賀兄栄救績純副骨仮聖晴券魚覧礼届操憲仏律署束沖迷宝飯損丁犬盟災吸冬鹿頂貨郷至均悲借謝縮郵歯腹荷包臣湯洗衣翌燃牛臨昼窓舎黄幼童砂誤鳴郡眼奏菜昔誕酸胸乳貸沿宙雲縄皮塩秒耳詩努祖賛液招勉箱梅揮句姉矢敬捨浅慣看漢浴熊忠緑桜尊虫豆祝妹旗泣賃訓紅寒勇干湖才銭穴毒潮柱詞鏡誠仁唱帳孫漁俳臓貧枝畑炭拝預晩岐牧序灯飼刀暖冊械孝鼻粉往棒氷卵熟刷墓糸貯縦泳潟脈肥貿麦弁兆糖梨垂朗恩埼暑蒸奮巣拾銅鉱径綿舌寸磁灰茨芽耕鋼潔皿肺腸阜貝胃班弓滋栃羊机尺后笛俵穀媛陛汽絹蚕

== Special characters ==
=== Kokuji ===
Kokuji are characters originally created in Japan; two of them are kyōiku kanji: 働 (Grade 4) and 畑 (Grade 3). There are also 8 kokuji within the secondary-school kanji and 16 within the jinmeiyō kanji. The character 働 and some others are also used in Chinese now, but most kokuji are unknown outside Japan.

=== Kokkun ===
Kokkun are characters and combinations of characters that have different meanings in Japanese and Chinese

For example, the character combination 手紙 means 'letter' in Japanese, but 'toilet paper' in Chinese. However, the isolated characters have the same meaning in both languages: 手 (Grade 1) means 'hand', and 紙 (Grade 2) means 'paper'.

== Simplified characters and their traditional forms ==
=== Differences in simplification between China and Japan ===
China and Japan simplified their writing systems independently from each other. After World War II, their relations were hostile, so they did not cooperate. Traditional Chinese characters are still officially used in Hong Kong, Macao, Taiwan, Korea (Hanja supplemented Hangul, but are now mainly historical), and by many overseas Chinese.

In Chinese, many more characters were simplified than in Japanese; some characters were simplified in only one language; other characters were simplified in the same way in both languages, and other characters were simplified in both languages but in different ways. This means that those who want to learn the writing systems of both languages must sometimes learn at least three different variations of one character: traditional Chinese, simplified Chinese, and modern Japanese (for example 兩 - 两 - 両). Some others have more variations, such as (斗 - 鬥 - 鬭 - 鬬 - 鬪 - 鬦 - 闘 - 閗), some of which are considered the older forms of Chinese characters and variations of different Chinese regions, and the older forms of Japanese characters (kyūjitai).

	Traditional Chinese	Simplified Chinese	Modern Japanese
Group 1: No simplification in either language	田	田	田
Group 2: Simplified in Chinese only	門	门	門
Group 3: Simplified in Japanese only	佛	佛	仏
Group 4: Same simplification in both languages	萬	万	万
Group 5: Different simplification in each language	兩	两	両

=== Traditional characters that may cause problems displaying ===
Note that within the kyōiku kanji, there are 26 characters; the old forms of which may cause problems displaying:

- Grade 2 (2 kanji): 海 社
- Grade 3 (8 kanji): 勉 暑 漢 神 福 練 者 都
- Grade 4 (6 kanji): 器 殺 祝 節 梅 類
- Grade 5 (1 kanji): 祖
- Grade 6 (9 kanji): 勤 穀 視 署 層 著 諸 難 朗
- Within the jōyō kanji, the same is true for 36 secondary-school kanji, so, in total, 62 of the 2,136 jōyō kanji have traditional forms that may cause problems displaying.

These characters are Unicode CJK Unified Ideographs for which the old form (kyūjitai) and the new form (shinjitai) have been unified under the Unicode standard. Although the old and new forms are distinguished under the JIS X 0213 standard, the old forms map to Unicode CJK Compatibility Ideographs which are considered by Unicode to be canonically equivalent to the new forms and may not be distinguished by user agents. Therefore, depending on the user environment, it may not be possible to see the distinction between old and new forms of the characters. In particular, all Unicode normalization methods merge the old characters with the new ones.

=== List of simplified kyōiku kanji ===
For example, 万 is the simplified form of 萬. Note that 弁 is used to simplify three different traditional characters (辨, 瓣, and 辯).

- 万 萬, 両 兩, 画 畫, 昼 晝, 蚕 蠶, 悪 惡, 旧 舊, 単 單, 巣 巢, 争 爭, 来 來, 乗 乘, 勉 勉, 厳 嚴, 予 豫, 変 變, 仏 佛, 会 會, 伝 傳, 仮 假, 体 體, 余 餘, 価 價, 児 兒, 並 竝, 円 圓, 写 寫, 労 勞, 効 效, 勤 勤, 区 區, 医 醫, 真 眞, 点 點, 圧 壓, 歴 歷, 台 臺, 弁 (辨 瓣 辯),
- 参 參, 収 收, 号 號, 営 營, 器 器, 団 團, 図 圖, 囲 圍, 国 國, 売 賣, 声 聲, 塩 鹽, 増 增, 処 處, 条 條, 学 學, 実 實, 宝 寶, 専 專, 当 當, 県 縣, 党 黨, 届 屆, 属 屬, 層 層, 巻 卷, 帯 帶, 広 廣, 庁 廳, 応 應, 帰 歸, 径 徑, 従 從, 徳 德, 衛 衞, 戦 戰, 担 擔, 拡 擴, 拝 拜, 挙 擧, 数 數, 対 對, 断 斷, 晩 晚, 暑 暑, 栄 榮, 梅 梅, 桜 櫻, 検 檢, 楽 樂, 様 樣, 権 權, 横 橫, 欠 缺, 歩 步, 残 殘, 殺 殺, 穀 穀, 毎 每, 気 氣, 海 海, 浅 淺, 済 濟, 満 滿, 温 溫, 漢 漢, 灯 燈, 焼 燒, 状 狀, 将 將, 独 獨, 発 發, 研 硏, 礼 禮, 社 社, 神 神, 祖 祖, 祝 祝, 視 視, 福 福, 秘 祕, 節 節, 糸 絲, 経 經, 絵 繪, 続 續, 総 總, 練 練, 緑 綠, 縦 縱, 署 署, 者 者, 朗 朗, 脳 腦, 臓 臟, 乱 亂, 辞 辭, 芸 藝, 著 著, 蔵 藏, 薬 藥, 虫 蟲, 装 裝, 覚 覺, 覧 覽, 観 觀, 訳 譯, 証 證, 読 讀, 諸 諸, 豊 豐, 賛 贊, 転 轉, 軽 輕, 辺 邊, 都 都, 郷 鄕, 鉄 鐵, 鉱 鑛, 銭 錢, 録 錄, 関 關, 険 險, 雑 雜, 難 難, 静 靜, 類 類, 駅 驛, 験 驗, 麦 麥, 黄 黃, 黒 黑, 歯 齒

== The kyōiku kanji and their Chinese hànzì equivalents ==
The characters are sorted by the radicals of the Japanese kanji. The two kokuji 働 and 畑, which have no Chinese equivalents, are not listed here. See also the section § Differences in simplification between China and Japan above.

=== Same form in Chinese and Japanese ===
The following kyōiku kanji are characters of Group 1 (not simplified in either language, e.g. 田). For characters of Group 2 (same simplification in China and Japan, but a traditional form exists, e.g. 万-萬-万), see § Differences in simplification between China and Japan above.

- 一 丁 下 三 不 天 五 民 正 平 可 再 百 否 武 夏 中 内 出 本 世 申 由 史 冊 央 向 曲 印 州 表 果 半 必 永 求 九 丸 千 久 少 夫 午 失 末 未 包 年 危 后 兵 我 束 卵 承 垂 刷 重 省 看 勉 七 乳 才 予 事 二 元 亡 六 主 市 交 忘 夜 育 京 卒 商 率 就 人 化 今 仁 付 代 仕 他 令 以 合 全 任 休 件 仲 作 何 位 住 余 低 似 命 使 念 例 供 信 保 便 値 修 借 候 倍 俳 俵 健 停 働 像 先 入 八 分 公 共 弟 並 典 前 益 善 尊 同 周 次 兆 冷 弱 刀 切 別 判 制 券 刻 副 割 力 加 助 努 勇 勤 句 北 疑 十 古 孝 直 南 真 裁 博 上 反 灰 厚 原 台 能 友 収 口 司 右 兄 吸 告 君 味 呼 品 唱 器 四 回 因 困 固 土 去 地 在 寺 均 志 坂 幸 型 城 基 域 喜 境 士 冬 各 夕 外 名 多 大 太 奏 女 好 始 妻 姉 妹 姿 子 存 安 字 守 宅 宇 完 定 官 宙 宗 室 客 宣 家 害 案 容 宮 寄 密 宿 寒 富 察 寸 小 光 常 堂 尺 局 居 屋 展 山 岸 岩 炭 川 工 左 功 己 改 布 希 干 刊 幼 序 店 底 府 度 座 席 庭 康 延 建 式 弓 引 強 形 役 往 径 待 律 徒 得 街 心 快 性 忠 急 恩 情 感 想 成 戸 所 手 打 投 折 技 批 招 持 指 拾 接 推 探 授 提 操 支 政 故 教 救 散 敬 文 新 方 放 旅 族 旗 日 早 明 易 昔 春 星 昨 映 昭 最 量 景 晴 暗 暖 暴 曜 月 木 札 材 村 板 林 松 枚 枝 相 査 染 柱 格 校 根 株 械 植 棒 森 模 歌 止 整 死 列 段 母 毒 比 毛 氏 水 池 汽 法 治 波 油 注 河 泣 沿 泳 洋 活 派 洗 流 消 酒 浴 深 混 清 液 港 測 湖 源 演 潮 激 火 然 照 熟 燃 受 父 片 版 牛 物 牧 特 犬 犯 王 玉 班 理 球 望 生 用 田 男 町 思 界 胃 留 略 病 痛 登 白 的 皇 泉 皮 皿 盛 盟 目 具 眼 矢 知 短 石 砂 破 磁 示 祭 禁 利 私 和 委 季 科 秋 秒 移 税 程 穴 究 空 立 童 竹 笑 第 笛 等 答 策 筋 算 管 箱 米 料 粉 精 糖 素 置 罪 羊 美 差 着 群 羽 翌 老 考 耕 耳 取 有 肉 服 肥 背 肺 胸 期 朝 腹 臣 自 息 至 舌 航 船 良 色 花 苦 若 英 芽 草 茶 荷 菜 落 幕 墓 蒸 暮 血 行 衣 初 西 要 票 角 解 言 警 谷 欲 豆 象 赤 走 起 足 路 身 射 返 近 述 送 追 退 逆 迷 通 速 造 道 郡 部 配 酸 番 里 野 防 限 院 降 除 陛 障 集 雨 雪 青 非 悲 面 革 音 章 意 食 首 骨 高

=== Different forms in Chinese and Japanese ===
The order is "Modern Japanese -Traditional Chinese - Simplified Chinese", e.g. 両-兩-两. Some characters were simplified the same way in both languages, the others were simplified in one language only.

- 万-萬-万, 両-兩-两, 画-畫-画, 昼-晝-昼, 蚕-蠶-蚕, 悪-惡-恶, 旧-舊-旧, 師-師-师, 氷-冰-冰, 単-單-单, 巣-巢-巢, 業-業-业, 争-爭-争, 来-來- 来, 東-東-东, 乗-乘-乘, 島-島-岛, 劇-劇-剧, 厳-嚴-严, 願-願-愿, 変-變-变, 裏-裏-里, 仏-佛-佛, 会-會-会, 伝-傳-传, 仮-假-假, 体-體-体, 価-價-价, 舎-舍-舍, 係-係-系, 個-個-个, 倉-倉-仓, 側-側-侧, 備-備-备, 傷-傷-伤, 億-億-亿, 優-優-优, 児-兒-儿, 貧-貧-贫, 興-興-兴, 円-圓-圆, 写-寫-写, 軍-軍-军, 創-創-创, 労-勞-劳, 効-效-效, 動-動-动, 勢-勢-势, 区-區-区, 医-醫-医, 協-協-协, 準-準-准, 幹-幹-干, 点-點-点, 圧-壓-压, 歴-歷-历, 弁-(辨 瓣 辯)-(辨 瓣 辩), 参-參-参, 号-號-号, 員-員-员, 営-營-营, 鳴-鳴-鸣, 団-團-团, 図-圖-图, 囲-圍-围, 国-國-国, 園-園-园, 売-賣-卖, 声-聲-声, 場-場-场, 報-報-报, 塩-鹽-盐, 増-增-增, 処-處-处, 条-條-条, 奮-奮-奋, 婦-婦-妇, 学-學-学, 孫-孫-孙, 実-實-实, 宝-寶-宝, 憲-憲-宪, 専-專-专, 導-導-导, 当-當-当, 県-縣-县, 党-黨-党, 賞-賞-赏, 届-屆-届, 属-屬-属, 層-層-层, 災-災-灾, 順-順-顺, 巻-卷-卷, 帯-帶-带, 帳-帳-帐, 広-廣-广, 庁-廳-庁, 応-應-应, 庫-庫-库, 張-張-张, 帰-歸-归, 後-後-后, 従-從-从, 術-術-术, 復-復-复, 徳-德-德, 衛-衛-卫, 態-態-态, 慣-慣-惯, 戦-戰-战, 担-擔-担, 拡-擴-扩, 拝-拜-拜, 挙-擧-举, 採-採-采, 捨-捨-舍, 揮-揮-挥, 損-損-损, 数-數-数, 敵-敵-敌, 対-對-对, 断-斷-断, 時-時-时, 晩-晚-晚, 暑-暑-暑, 題 -題 -题, 栄-榮-荣, 梅-梅-梅, 桜-櫻-樱, 検-檢-检, 楽-樂-乐, 極-極-极, 様-樣-样, 構-構-构, 権-權-权, 横-橫-横, 標-標-标, 機-機-机, 樹-樹-树, 橋-橋-桥, 欠-缺-欠, 歩-步-歩, 残-殘-残, 殺-殺-杀, 穀-穀-谷, 毎-每-毎, 気-氣-气, 決-決-决, 海-海-海, 浅-淺-浅, 済-濟-济, 減-減-减, 満-滿-满, 温-溫-温,測-測-测, 湯-湯-汤, 漢-漢-汉, 漁-漁-渔, 潔-潔-洁, 灯-燈-灯, 無-無-无, 焼-燒-烧,熱-熱-热, 愛-愛-爱, 状-狀-状, 将-將-将, 独-獨-独, 現-現-现, 聖-聖-圣, 異-異-异, 発-發-发, 務-務-务, 研-硏-研, 確-確-确, 礼-禮-礼, 社-社-社, 神-神-神, 祖-祖-祖, 祝-祝-祝,視-視-视, 福-福-福, 秘-祕-秘, 種-種-种, 積-積-积, 窓-窗-窓, 産-産-产, 競-競-竞, 筆-筆-笔, 節-節-节, 築-築-筑, 簡-簡-简, 糸-絲-丝, 約-約-约, 級-級-级, 紅-紅-红, 紀-紀-纪, 紙-紙-纸, 納-納-纳, 純-純-纯, 経-經-经, 組-組-组, 終-終-终, 細-細-细, 結-結-结,絶-絶-绝, 給-給-给, 統-統-统, 絵-繪-绘, 続-續-续, 絹-絹-绢, 総-總-总, 練-練-练, 緑-綠-绿, 綿-綿-绵, 線-線-线, 編-編-编, 縦-縱-纵, 縮-縮-缩, 績-績-绩, 織-織-织, 買-買-买, 署-署-署, 義-義-义, 養-養-养, 習-習-习, 者-者-者, 職-職-职, 書-書-书, 脈-脈-脉, 朗-朗-朗, 脳-腦-脑, 勝-勝-胜, 腸-腸-肠, 臓-臟-脏, 臨-臨-临, 乱-亂-乱, 辞-辭-辞, 芸-藝-芸, 著-著-着, 葉-葉-叶, 夢-夢-梦, 蔵-藏-藏, 薬-藥-药, 虫-蟲-虫, 衆-衆-众, 装-裝-裝, 補-補-补, 製-製-制, 複-複-复, 見-見-见, 規-規-规, 覚-覺-觉, 親-親-亲, 覧-覽-览, 観-觀-观, 計-計-计, 記-記-记, 討-討-讨, 訓-訓-训, 設-設-设, 訳-譯-译, 許-許-许, 訪-訪-访, 証-證-证, 評-評-评, 詞-詞-词, 話-話-话, 試-試-试, 詩-詩-诗, 誠-誠-诚, 語-語-语, 読-讀-读, 説-説-说, 認-認-认, 誤-誤-误, 誌-誌-志, 調-調-调, 論-論-论, 談-談-谈, 課-課-课, 諸-諸-诸, 誕-誕-诞, 講-講-讲, 謝-謝-谢, 識-識-识, 議-議-议, 護-護-护, 豊-豐-丰, 頭-頭-头, 貝-貝-贝, 負-負-负, 則-則-则, 財-財-财, 敗-敗-败, 責-責-责, 貨-貨-货, 費-費-费, 貸-貸-贷, 貴-貴-贵, 貯-貯-贮, 賀-賀-贺, 貿-貿-贸, 資-資-资, 賃-賃-赁, 質-質-质, 賛-贊-赞, 車-車-车, 転-轉-转, 軽-輕-轻, 輪-輪-轮, 輸-輸-输, 農-農-农, 辺-邊-边, 連-連-连, 進-進-进, 週-週-周, 過-過-过, 運-運-运, 達-達-达, 遊-遊-游, 遠-遠-远, 適-適-适, 選-選-选, 遺-遺-遗, 都-都-都, 郷-鄕-乡, 郵-郵-邮, 針-針-针, 鉄-鐵-铁, 鉱-鑛-矿, 銀-銀-银, 銅-銅-铜, 銭-錢-钱, 録-錄-录, 鋼-鋼-钢, 鏡-鏡-镜, 長-長-长, 門-門-门, 問-問-问, 閉-閉-闭, 間-間-间, 開-開-开, 関-關-关, 聞-聞-闻, 閣-閣-阁, 陸-陸-陆, 険-險-险, 隊-隊-队, 階-階-阶, 陽-陽-阳, 際-際-际, 雑-雜-杂, 難-難-难, 雲-雲-云, 電-電-电, 静-靜-静, 頂-頂-顶, 預-預-预, 領-領-领, 顔-顏-颜, 類-類-类, 額-額-额, 風-風-风, 飛-飛-飞, 飲-飲-饮, 飯-飯-饭, 飼-飼-饲, 館-館-馆, 馬-馬-马, 駅-驛-驿, 験-驗-验, 魚-魚-鱼, 鳥-鳥-鸟, 麦-麥-麦, 黄-黃-黄, 黒-黑-黑, 鼻-鼻-鼻, 歯-齒-齿

== See also ==
- Kanji § Kanji education
- List of jōyō kanji
- List of kanji by stroke count
