= Four Treasures =

Four Treasures can refer to:

- Four Treasures of the Tuatha Dé Danann, four magical items in Irish legend
- Four Treasures of the Study, four implements for scholars in traditional China
- Complete Library of the Four Treasuries, Qianlong Emperor collection of classics, histories, philosophy, and literary works
- Annotated Bibliography of the Four Treasuries, annotated catalog of the Complete Library of the Four Treasuries
- Padarath, the four theological treasures of Sikhism
