= Liding =

Transcription of ancient Chinese script in clerical or regular scripts

- Traditional Chinese: 隸定
- Simplified Chinese: 隶定
- Literal meaning: clerical fixing
Transcriptions
Standard Mandarin
- Hanyu Pinyin: lìdìng
Yue: Cantonese
- Jyutping: dai6 ding6

Lixie
- Traditional Chinese: 隸寫
- Simplified Chinese: 隶写
- Literal meaning: writing in clerical script
Transcriptions
Standard Mandarin
- Hanyu Pinyin: lìxiě
Yue: Cantonese
- Jyutping: dai6 se2

Small seal script given in the Shuowen Jiezi (c. 100 AD)

Modern Ming-style regular script typeface

Comparison of historical forms for 春 'spring'

Liding, sometimes referred to as lixie, is the practice of rewriting ancient Chinese character forms in clerical or regular script. Liding is often used in Chinese textual studies.

== Terminology ==
During the Han dynasty (202 BC – 220 AD), the clerical script reached its matured form, in which Chinese characters became largely rectilinear and readily segmented into strokes. The script in current use, the regular script, inherited this feature. By comparison, the scripts prior to the maturity of the clerical script, including various scripts from the time period spanning the Shang dynasty, the Zhou dynasty, the Warring States era and the Qin dynasty, employed more sinuous lines, less stable shapes, and more ambiguous stroke segments.

This distinct difference in style, combined with the fact that the graphic structures of the characters have changed significantly over time, creates difficulty for character recognition and form analysis. Liding refers to the attempt to regularize the ancient scripts in clerical and post-clerical writing, so as to aid recognition of not only the characters themselves but their individual components. In An Outline of Grammatology, Chinese paleographer Qiu Xigui defines liding as "the transcription of ancient script forms into clerical-style forms while preserving the shapes of the former". The nomenclature clerically identified transcription is used by Chinese archaeologist Xing Wen, who gives as its definition "... a traditional Chinese palaeographical practice for transcriptions of ancient inscriptions ... [that] identifies the Clerical Script equivalent of the ancient character".

Despite the literal meaning of the name, liding in modern studies renders the character forms into regular script, as it is what most modern writings and typefaces are based on. The term kaiding (楷定; 'identify in regular form') is occasionally used to specifically refer to liding in the style of regular script, albeit not as often. A character that is the result of liding of an ancient graph is called a 'liding character' (隸定字).

=== Broad and narrow liding ===
Liding traditionally lacks a strictly defined code of practice. While general definitions are given, Chinese palaeographers tend to not elaborate on methodological details.

To qualify the strictness of transcriptions to the original graphs, the general terms broad liding (寬式隸定) and narrow liding (嚴式隸定), though they are not precisely defined. Li Shoukui proposes the distinction between liding by strokes and liding by components:

- Liding by strokes is the strictest form, converting the character to regular style while aiming to preserve every individual stroke in the graph, save that some stylistic details may be ignored. In practice, this method is used sparingly, often to preserve idiosyncrasies in certain graphs, or to transcribe unidentifiable characters. Even in the case of the latter, direct tracing is preferred over liding in order to avoid erroneous conversions.
- In liding by components, the structure is preserved per component instead of stroke. More alternations are allowed, such as removing redundant strokes or completing ellipted parts. Liding by components is the main liding method, as it displays the composition of the graph in the most accessible manner.

The following table provides some examples of liding.

Seal form	Liding forms		Source	Details
Seal form	Possible	Actual	Source	Details
朕-seal		朕 zhèn 'I'	Shuowen Jiezi	The shape 灷 became 关 after libian. Characters that have this component may be transcribed either broadly as 关, or narrowly as 灷. The former transcription prioritizes correspondences between components, while the later prioritizes the original visual structure.; ⾡ 'WALK' is usually transformed into ⻌.; The liding form demonstrates that the left-side radical of 朕 was originally ⾈ 'BOAT' instead of ⽉ 'MOON'.
		送 sòng 'to see someone off'	Guodian Chu Slips	The shape 灷 became 关 after libian. Characters that have this component may be transcribed either broadly as 关, or narrowly as 灷. The former transcription prioritizes correspondences between components, while the later prioritizes the original visual structure.; ⾡ 'WALK' is usually transformed into ⻌.; The liding form demonstrates that the left-side radical of 朕 was originally ⾈ 'BOAT' instead of ⽉ 'MOON'.
		賢 xián 'virtuous'	Guodian Chu Slips	Equivalent to 臤.; The function of the filled block in the top right corner is unclear.; The narrower liding form is transcribed as ⼝ 'MOUTH'. Where this uncommon feature is important, it may be necessary to narrowly transcribe the graph.
		得 dé 'to obtain'	Guodian Chu Slips	The structure of the liding form consists of 目 and 又, making the structure of the original graph clear to modern readers. This graph was a variant of (⿱貝又), which was the direct predecessor of 得 dé 'to obtain'.
		得 dé 'to obtain'	Da Ke ding	Another variant of that consisted of 貝 and 手, as the liding-by-component form suggests.; Compared with, one can see that two structurally distinct characters may be identified as distinct from one another, although they may still be allographs.

=== Comparison to other methods of transcription ===
Despite the lack of a rigorous definition, liding is generally considered distinct from the other two methods of transcription:

- The direct 'tracing' (摹寫; móxiě) of the graph. Tracing, as its name suggests, is the practice of tracing the original graph with minimal or no alterations. This is done when the transcriber is unable to rewrite the graph in question as a clerical form—for instance when the graph is purely pictorial, or when the transcriber cannot determine a plausible interpretation of the graph's structure.
- The 'interpretative transcription' or 'interpretation' (釋文; shìwén) of the graph. While liding preserves structure to some degree, interpretation only seeks to preserve meaning and completely disregards form. It substitutes the character in question with the corresponding character that is prevailing today to aid the understanding of the material. For example, in the Cao Mei Zhi Chen (曹沬之陳) slip, one of the Shanghai Museum bamboo slips, the name (⿰告攵 ⿰禾蔑) was transcribed by Li Ling as 曹沬, the most prevalent forms of the characters in contemporary use. Interpretative transcription is sometimes seen as a kind of broad liding.

=== Difference from libian ===
While liding refers to the transcription of archaic scripts in modern style, libian is the natural evolution from ancient scripts to clerical scripts. As the graphs often underwent drastic structural changes in the process of libian, the liding of a character could be considerably different from the same character after libian. Taking 年 'year', 'harvest' as an example:

Original and liding forms of 年
	Oracle bone	Small seal	Clerical	Regular
Evolution				年
Liding forms	秂	秊		
Comment	The oracle bone graph illustrated a person carrying grain (regular counterpart 禾) on their back—which reflected the original meaning of 'harvest'. The liding form 秂 reflects this by keeping the relative positions of the components unchanged, but changing the components to their regular counterparts.; In small seal script, a dot or stroke was added to the middle of the 'person' component. As a result, the bottom component was no longer 人, but instead coincides in shape with 'thousand' (regular counterpart 千). This change is reflected in the corresponding liding form, 秊, where 人 is swapped out for 千.; During libian, the structure of the character was drastically altered. The original components were rendered unrecognizable in the process. The contemporaneous regular form 年 is different from the liding forms provided.			

== Use ==
=== In palaeography ===
As a means of transcription, liding is an important part of the study of historical texts. It unearths structural information of the graph that was obscured by the archaic handwriting style, making it more accessible for modern uses. Additionally, the process of liding involves identifying the clerical counterparts of the various components of a character form, and thus in itself presents an analysis of the composition of the character in question. In research publications, liding is extensively used.

Liding is also used for digitizing historical scripts. A number of historical text databases with transcription provide liding versions of transcription.

=== In dictionaries ===
Chinese dictionaries have, as a traditional practice, utilized the liding forms to record ancient variants in dictionaries. The Song dynasty saw the rise of epigraphy (Chinese: 金石學; pinyin: jīnshí xué; lit. 'the study of bronze and stone'); as a result, a number of character dictionaries and rime dictionaries at the time, including Leipian and Jiyun, preserved archaic variants in regular script. After Song, with the waning of traditional Chinese epigraphy, though the practice survived, lexicographers mostly took the archaic forms directly from earlier dictionaries like Yupian, Leipian, and Jiyun.

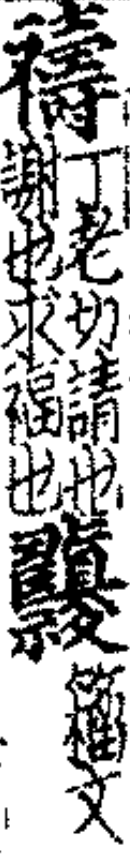

For example, the image shown is the entry of the character 禱 excerpted from the Song version of Yupian. As can be seen, a clerically identified zhouwen (Chinese: 籀文; lit. 'the script of Shizhou'; a type of seal script from late-Western Zhou as recorded in the dictionary Shizhoupian) of 禱 is included.

The text in the image is read from top to bottom, right to left:

禱。丁老切。請也，謝也，求福也。𥜹。籀文。

("禱, 丁老 qie, which is to request; to thank; to pray for happiness. 𥜹 is the zhouwen.")

Entry form	Zhouwen as per Shuowen Jiezi	Zhouwen liding	Comment
禱			dǎo 'to pray'

== Unicode encoding ==
Rare forms encountered in ancient scripts are sometimes restricted to a specific period or even to a limited number of historical artefacts, and liding is a process that often requires fine structural differentiation; it is thus not unusual that character forms required in liding are uncoded in Unicode. Specialized fonts sometimes utilize Private Use Areas to store liding graphs that see non-one off uses but are uncoded.

A number of liding-specific characters do have their dedicated Unicode code points. Notably, there are 1808 ideographs introduced from the work Yinzhou Jinwen Jicheng Yinde (殷周金文集成引得 [Concordance of Shang and Zhou Dynasty Bronze Inscriptions]), with 365 in CJK Unified Ideographs Extension C, 1410 in Extension E and 33 in Extension F. The majority of them are liding forms of graphs found in the bronze inscriptions. Their kIRG_GSource field values start with GZJW.
