= Libian =

Simplification of Chinese characters in clerical script

Chinese name
- Traditional Chinese: 隸變
- Simplified Chinese: 隶变
- Literal meaning: clerical change
Transcriptions
Standard Mandarin
- Hanyu Pinyin: lìbiàn
Yue: Cantonese
- Jyutping: dai6 bin3

Korean name
- Hangul: 예변
- Hanja: 隸變
Transcriptions
- Revised Romanization: yebyeon

Japanese name
- Kanji: 隷変
- Hiragana: れいへん
Transcriptions
- Romanization: reihen

Qin-era seal script (c. 200 BC)

Han-era clerical script (c. 200 AD)

Comparison of historical forms for 馬 'horse'. The clerical form more closely resembles modern regular script.

Libian was a gradual, systematic simplification of Chinese character forms during the 2nd century BC, by which the Chinese writing system transitioned from the seal script character forms promulgated during the Qin dynasty (221–206 BC) to the clerical script characters associated with the Han dynasty (202 BC – 220 AD), through the process of making omissions, additions, or transmutations of the graphical form of a character to make it easier to write. Libian was one of two conversion processes towards the new clerical script character forms, with the other being liding, which involved the regularisation and linearisation of character shapes.

== Process ==
The earlier seal script characters were complicated and inconvenient to write; as a result, lower-level officials and clerics 隸; lì gradually simplified the strokes, and transitioned from writing with bowed ink brushes to using straight ink brushes, which both improved ease of writing.

The complexity of characters can be reduced in one of four ways:

- Modulation (調變): The replacement of character components with an unrelated component. For example, the ancient bronze script form of 射 'to shoot arrows' was written as, however the left-side component became replaced with 身 'body' during the transition to clerical script writing.
- Mutation (突變): Some characters undergo modulation so suddenly that no clue hinting at the original form can be found in the new form. For example, the transition from the seal script character / 萅 'spring' to the clerical (and by extension, modern) form 春 completely drops any hints of the original 芚 component, instead replacing it with 𡗗 which seemingly has zero basis in relation to the original component.
- Omission (省變): The complete omission of a character component. For example, the clerical script form of 書 'to write' (Old Chinese: *hlja) completely omits the phonetic component 者 *tjaːʔ at the bottom of the seal script form / 𦘠.
- Reduction (簡變): Simplifies character components to a form with fewer strokes. For example, the ancient form of / 僊 *sen 'celestial being' had the complex phonetic component 䙴 *sʰen simplified into 山 *sreːn, creating the clerical form 仙.

One consequence of the libian transition process is that many radicals formed as a result of simplifying complex components within seal script characters—for example, characters containing 'heart' / 心 on the side had the component simplified into 忄, as seen in 情 and 恨, and these newly-formed radicals are still used in modern-day Chinese writing as the fundamental basis for constructing and sorting Chinese characters.

Examples of libian
Gloss	Old	New	Pinyin	Details
year, harvest	秊	年	nián	Originally 秂 in ancient bronze forms, the character was an ideogrammic compound of a man 人 carrying grain 禾 on his back, e.g. a harvest; 人 also functioned as the phonetic marker for OC *njin. After the Western Zhou period, the ancient bronze form had an additional stroke added to 人 to give 千, which continued to function as a phonetic marker for *sn̥ʰiːn, creating, forming the basis for the seal script form 秊. After libian simplification, the resulting clerical script form became 年. (Note: Dictionary of Chinese Character Variants, A01194; Multi-function Chinese Character Database, 年)
thunder	靁	雷	léi	Originally semantic 雨 'rain' + phonetic 畾 *ruːl, the bottom component became reduced into 田 during libian. (Note: Dictionary of Chinese Character Variants, A04472; Multi-function Chinese Character Database, 雷)
to offer for the dead		奠	diàn	Originally a pictogram of an alcohol vessel 酉 placed upon a mat 一, two strokes 八 were added to later forms to represent overflowing alcohol, and a further two strokes 八 were subsequently added to the mat to form a table with two legs 丌. During libian, the 丌 mutated into 大, resulting in the clerical form. (Note: Dictionary of Chinese Character Variants, A00872; Multi-function Chinese Character Database, 奠)
because	㠯	以	yǐ	Originally a pictogram of a person 人 carrying an object, the seal script form was modulated during libian to create the clerical form 以. (Note: Dictionary of Chinese Character Variants, A00078; Multi-function Chinese Character Database, 以)
to obtain	𢔶	得	dé	Seal script form, the 貝 initially simplifies into 目 during libian into earlier clerical variants; later variants further corrupt this component into 旦, and this clerical form is inherited by the modern character form. (Note: Dictionary of Chinese Character Variants, A01291; Multi-function Chinese Character Database, 得)
to include	圅	函	hán	Seal script form. (Note: Dictionary of Chinese Character Variants, A00327; Multi-function Chinese Character Database, 函)
to change	㪅	更	gèng	Seal script form, consisting of phonetic 丙 *pqraŋʔ + semantic 攴 'to tap'. (Note: Dictionary of Chinese Character Variants, A01833; Multi-function Chinese Character Database, 更)
board game	棊	棋	qí	Seal script form, consisting of semantic 木 'tree' + phonetic 其 *kɯ, *ɡɯ. The 木 component was relocated to the left side during libian. (Note: Dictionary of Chinese Character Variants, A01966; Multi-function Chinese Character Database, 棋)
without	橆	無	wú	Ancient bronze form originally a pictogram of a man holding two objects in both hands while dancing, the seal script form became. During libian, the 木 components were modulated and resulted in the character becoming 無. This character is a phonetic borrowing for 'without', while / 舞 consisting of phonetic 無 *ma + semantic 舛 'steps' retains the original meaning of 'dance'. (Note: Dictionary of Chinese Character Variants, A02416; Multi-function Chinese Character Database, 無)
thought	恖	思	sī	Seal script form consisting of phonetic 囟 *snɯns + semantic 心 'heart', the 囟 component corrupted into the completely unrelated character 田 during libian. (Note: Dictionary of Chinese Character Variants, A01330; Multi-function Chinese Character Database, 思)
forward	歬	前	qián	Seal script form originally depicting a foot 止 on a boat 舟 moving forward. During libian, 止 was reduced to 䒑, as was 舟 to 月. The addition of 刂 'knife' within 前 was originally used to represent the meaning of 'to cut' *ʔslenʔ, as seen in / 𣦃 / 𠝣; however, because 前 became used to represent 歬 instead, an additional 刀 'knife' was added to 剪 for the purpose of representing the character for "to cut". (Note: Dictionary of Chinese Character Variants, A00355; Multi-function Chinese Character Database, 前)
side by side	竝	並	bìng	Seal script form was a duplication of 立 'standing person'; underwent modulation during libian transition. (Note: Dictionary of Chinese Character Variants, A00018; Multi-function Chinese Character Database, 並)
hill	丠	丘	qiū	Seal script form; compare with representing 北 'north'. (Note: Dictionary of Chinese Character Variants, A00015; Multi-function Chinese Character Database, 丘)
to ascend	椉	乘	chéng	Seal script form originally representing climbing a tree 木 with visible feet / 舛, which was later simplified to 禾 + 北 during libian. (Note: Dictionary of Chinese Character Variants, A00037; Multi-function Chinese Character Database, 乘)
to revolve around	𠄢	亘	xuān	Seal script form consisted of an ideogrammic compound 二 'two' + 囘 'turns'. (Note: Dictionary of Chinese Character Variants, N00001)
fourth earthly branch	戼	卯	mǎo	Originally depicted a Shang dynasty ritual of splitting a sacrificial body in half, as seen in seal script form. (Note: Dictionary of Chinese Character Variants, A00448; Multi-function Chinese Character Database, 卯)
death	𣦸	死	sǐ	Originally an ideogrammic compound consisting of / 歹 'human remains' + / 人 'man', as seen in seal script. (Note: Dictionary of Chinese Character Variants, A02077; Multi-function Chinese Character Database, 死)
to rid	㚎	去	qù	Seal script form. Top component simplified to 土, bottom component simplified to 厶. Origin highly contested; Shuowen Jiezi suggests a phono-semantic compound with semantic 大 'man' + phonetic 𠙴 *kʰaʔ or *kʰas, while Axel Schuessler suggests that it depicts an anus beneath a man, representing 'to get rid of'. Alternate interpretations include a man departing from a cave, lips departing from one another—re-borrowed from 呿 'to open one's mouth', or the 大 representing a cover atop an object re-borrowed from 盍 'to cover'.
also		也	yě	The Shuowen Jiezi describes this character as a pictogram of a female vulva. Libian form is significantly simplified from the original shape. (Note: Dictionary of Chinese Character Variants, A00040; Multi-function Chinese Character Database, 也)
summer	夓	夏	xià	The libian form removes the 𦥑 component and the legs of 頁 'head' from the seal script form. (Note: Dictionary of Chinese Character Variants, A00837; Multi-function Chinese Character Database, 夏)
what	𠥄	甚	shèn, shén	The libian form modulates the upper component of the seal script form, originally an ideogrammic compound of 甘 + 匹. (Note: Dictionary of Chinese Character Variants, A02621; Multi-function Chinese Character Database, 甚)
to live	𤯓	生	shēng	Seal script form represents a sprout 屮 emerging from the ground. (Note: Dictionary of Chinese Character Variants, A02623; Multi-function Chinese Character Database, 生)
to use	𤰃	用	yòng	Seal script form *loŋs; variants 𠂦, 𤰆, 𠂵 originally depicted a pictogram of a water bucket; compare with 桶 *l̥ʰoːŋʔ 'bucket'. (Note: Dictionary of Chinese Character Variants, A02627; Multi-function Chinese Character Database, 用)
alliance	𥂗	盟	méng	Seal script form, with 囧 'window' simplified to 日 'sun' during libian. (Note: Dictionary of Chinese Character Variants, A02749; Multi-function Chinese Character Database, 盟) 朙 was an ancient form of 明 *mraŋ 'bright'. (Note: Dictionary of Chinese Character Variants, A01784; Multi-function Chinese Character Database, 明)
flower	𠌶	花	huā	Seal script form. The characters 𠌶 and 華 / 𦻏 were originally the same character, however were erroneously split into two separate entries within the Shuowen Jiezi. (Note: Dictionary of Chinese Character Variants, A03503-018; Multi-function Chinese Character Database, 花) 華 *ɡʷraː 'to flower' is a derivative of 𠌶 *hʷraː 'a flower'.
Malva verticillata; Livistona chinensis; Basella alba	𦮙	葵	kuí	Seal script form 𦮙. (Note: Dictionary of Chinese Character Variants, A03522; Multi-function Chinese Character Database, 葵)
west	㢴	西	xī	Seal script form originally represented a pictogram of a bag or basket, which was then borrowed phonetically to mean 'west'. (Note: Dictionary of Chinese Character Variants, A03762; Multi-function Chinese Character Database, 西)
edge	𨘢	邊	biān	The earlier bronze inscription form consisted of 辵, 自, 丙 and 方; the lower right component within the seal script form is the result of 方 becoming corrupted. As the clerical variant later took form, the 方 component made a reappearance in texts. (Note: Dictionary of Chinese Character Variants, A04196; Multi-function Chinese Character Database, 邊)
to eat	𠊊	食	shí	Seal script form. The bottom component of the modern libian form is a simplification of 皀 'food vessel', and is not cognate to the unrelated 良 or 艮. (Note: Dictionary of Chinese Character Variants, A04581; Multi-function Chinese Character Database, 食)
fantasy	𠄔	幻	huàn	Seal script form was originally an inversion of 予 'to give'. (Note: Dictionary of Chinese Character Variants, A01197; Multi-function Chinese Character Database, 幻)
hometown	𨞰	鄉	xiāng	Originally an ideogrammic compound consisting of 𠨍 'two people facing each other' + 皀 'food vessel' within bronze inscriptions, representing 'to feast'. During the transition to the seal script form, 𠨍 became corrupted into 𨙨 and 邑. Following libian simplification, 邑 became simplified into the etymologically cognate 阝 radical, 𨙨 simplified into the unrelated 乡 radical—cognate to / 幺, and 皀 was replaced with the unrelated 良 component. The meaning of 'hometown' was acquired via phonetic borrowing, while 饗 *qʰaŋʔ was adopted to represent 'feast'. (Note: Dictionary of Chinese Character Variants, A04217; Multi-function Chinese Character Database, 鄉)
fragrant		香	xiāng	Seal script form consisted of 黍 'proso millet' + 甘 'sweet'; the libian form simplifies 黍 into 禾 'cereal plant', and replaces the bottom 甘 component with the unrelated character 曰 'to say'. (Note: Dictionary of Chinese Character Variants, A04616; Multi-function Chinese Character Database, 香)
fish	𤋳	魚	yú	Seal script form. (Note: Dictionary of Chinese Character Variants, A04691; Multi-function Chinese Character Database, 魚)
night	𡖍	夜	yè	Seal script form consisted of phonetic 亦 *laːɡ + semantic 夕 'crescent moon'; the bottom-right component of 夜 is a corruption of 夕 following libian, while the 亠 + 亻 is a reduction of 亦. (Note: Dictionary of Chinese Character Variants, A00843; Multi-function Chinese Character Database, 夜)
stomach		胃	wèi	The pictographic component that visually represented a stomach was simplified into 田. (Note: Dictionary of Chinese Character Variants, A03311; Multi-function Chinese Character Database, 胃)
excrement	𦳊	屎	shǐ	Seal script form consisted of an ideogrammic compound 艸 'grass' + 胃 'stomach'. The form that gained widespread use in literature following the transition to clerical script is based on the bronze script form from the Warring States period. (Note: Dictionary of Chinese Character Variants, A01086; Multi-function Chinese Character Database, 屎)
to migrate		徙	xǐ	The 止 portion of the left 辵 component was relocated to the right during libian, resulting in two 止 on top of one another, coincidentally becoming unified with the same structure as 歨; the Shang dynasty form of 步 'to walk'. (Note: Dictionary of Chinese Character Variants, A01292; Multi-function Chinese Character Database, 徙)
