= Wu Qiuyan =

Yuan dynasty epigraphist, scholar, and poet (1268–1311)

- 吾丘衍
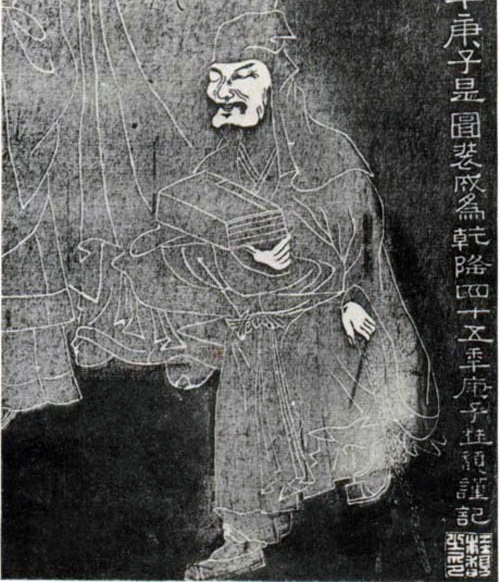
- Scholar
- Born: Zixing; 1268; Kaihua 開化 (Now known as Zhejiang, Longyou), also known as Quzhou, Zhejiang Province
- Died: 1311 (aged 42–43)
- Other names: Plain clothes Daoist (布衣道士); White Hermit (真白居士) 貞白 (Zhenbai) 竹房 (Zhufang) 竹素 (Zhusu)
- Era: Yuan dynasty
- Known for: Founder of the seals
- Notable work: Writings： 《學古編》(Learning from the Ancients - Compilation) 《竹素山房詩集》(Poetry collection from the Cottage of Bamboo on the Mountains 《印式》Seal style（two volumes） 《閒居錄》(Diary of a Leisurely Life); Music： 《九歌》(Nine songs) 《农历十二月樂譜》Music of the Twelfth Month; Commentaries： 《周代秦代刻石釋音》Interpretation of the Inscriptions on Zhou and Qin Stone Tablets 《晉文春秋》The Chronicle of Jin Literature 《尚书要略》Summary of the Shangshu

Wu Qiuyan (Chinese: 吾丘衍; 1268–1311), also known as Wuyan, courtesy name Zixing, art name Zhenbai, Zhufang and Zhusu, using the alternative names Buyi Daoist and Zhenbai Hermit, and with the scholar name Shenghua Fang. In the early Qing dynasty, he avoided using the given name of Confucius (孔丘), so he adopted the name Wu Qiuyan, and he was commonly referred to as Mr. Zhenbai. He was a great master of epigraphy during the Yuan dynasty, proficient in poetry and lyrics, well-versed in music theory, and with a rich collection. He was born in Kongbu, Huabu town, Kaihua, and some sources state that he was from Quzhou in Zhejiang. He lived in Qiantang and excelled particularly in seal carving.

== Life ==
=== Birth ===
Wu Qiuyan was born with congenital blindness in his left eye and a limp in his right leg. His friends liked his natural humor and felt that his conduct still displayed grace despite his disabilities.

=== Life of seclusion ===
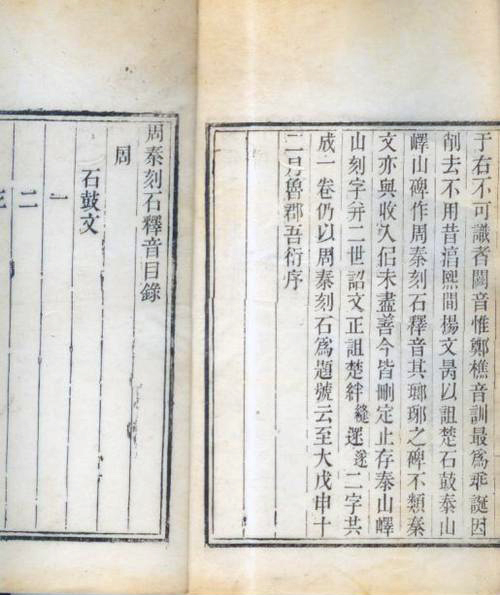
Wu Qiuyan's "Explanations of Zhou-Qin Stone Carvings" (reprint)

Wu Qiuyan never held any official position. He lived in seclusion in Qiantang, Shenghua Fang. He spent years sitting and reading in his small home tower without any idleness. He often had around a hundred students coming to study with him, lecturing on scriptures and discussing philosophy tirelessly. Xu Yan, the commissioner for political integrity in southern Jiangnan and western Zhejiang, once came to visit him out of admiration. Wu Qiuyan refused to meet him and shouted from the study tower, "Is this tower suitable for a nobleman to ascend? I would be willing to meet you tomorrow." The next day, Wu Qiuyan did not visit in person to express his gratitude, showing his straightforward nature.

=== Marriage ===
Due to his physical disabilities, Wu Qiuyan could not live like an ordinary person and only got married when he was nearly forty years old. After marrying a young girl from the Zhao family, who sold liquor, he faced an even greater misfortune: the girl was originally a married woman but had returned to her mother's home to escape a bad year. Her father concealed the truth and married her off to Wu Qiuyan. Four years later, the original husband of Zhao's daughter discovered the situation and reported Wu Qiuyan. Additionally, Zhao's family was involved in counterfeiting money, which also implicated Wu Qiuyan. As a result, he was arrested and subjected to humiliation.

=== Suicide ===
Wu Qiuyan later visited Chou Yuan but didn't meet him. He left behind a poem:

"Liu Ling's efforts were in vain, Butterflies fly westward, to another realm they go. To inquire about the Taiyuan era, where to ask and know? By the broken bridge, on the western shore, below". Someone found Wu Qiuyan's shoes at the broken bridge, leading to suspicions that he had drowned by suicide. Wu Qiuyan's disciples held a memorial service for him by the West Lake in Hangzhou, and his old friend Hu Changru wrote his epitaph.

However, there are also historical records suggesting that Wu Qiuyan created a false image by leaving behind his poem, faked his own death, and lived in seclusion in his hometown of Kaihua to spend his remaining years in peace. The accounts vary, making this a popular historical mystery.

== Personality and aspirations ==
The formation of Wu Qiuyan's personality was closely related to his physical disabilities. Due to these limitations, he couldn't pursue a career through scholarly pursuits like others. This heavy blow left a deep-seated trauma in his heart, resulting in a conflicting personality marked by solitude, arrogance, a lack of ambition for fame and fortune, and a sense of regret for unfulfilled ambitions. Wu Qiuyan expressed his appreciation for time and lamented its fleeting nature in many of his poems, such as 'During the day, I sleep and sigh; beautiful moments slip away easily', 'The path, not played like a zither, and when the road ends, why bend one's waist?' and 'Time passes swiftly, and it's a pity; my youthful aspirations have often been in vain'.

Wu Qiuyan was renowned for his high moral standards, a free-spirited disposition, and a conversational style rich in humor. He was skilled in playing musical instruments like the bamboo flute, and when friends gathered, he often played the dongxiao (a type of vertical bamboo flute) on the spot to lighten the mood.

In his poem 'Sending Someone into Seclusion,' Wu Qiuyan depicted scenes of Taoist cultivation and alchemical practices: 'Guo Taixian dreams of distant gold; exceptional talents eventually disappear. Decaying bonds are like horses roaming a thousand miles; it's hard to confine them in cages. In the clouds and skies, I maintain lofty aspirations, while Zhu Su's lord understands my lifelong ambitions. As I depart in a flat-bottomed boat, I suddenly look back; in the future, we may reunite while wearing rustic clothing'. These verses reveal Wu Qiuyan's desire to renounce worldly ambitions and seek reclusion.

== Academic contributions ==
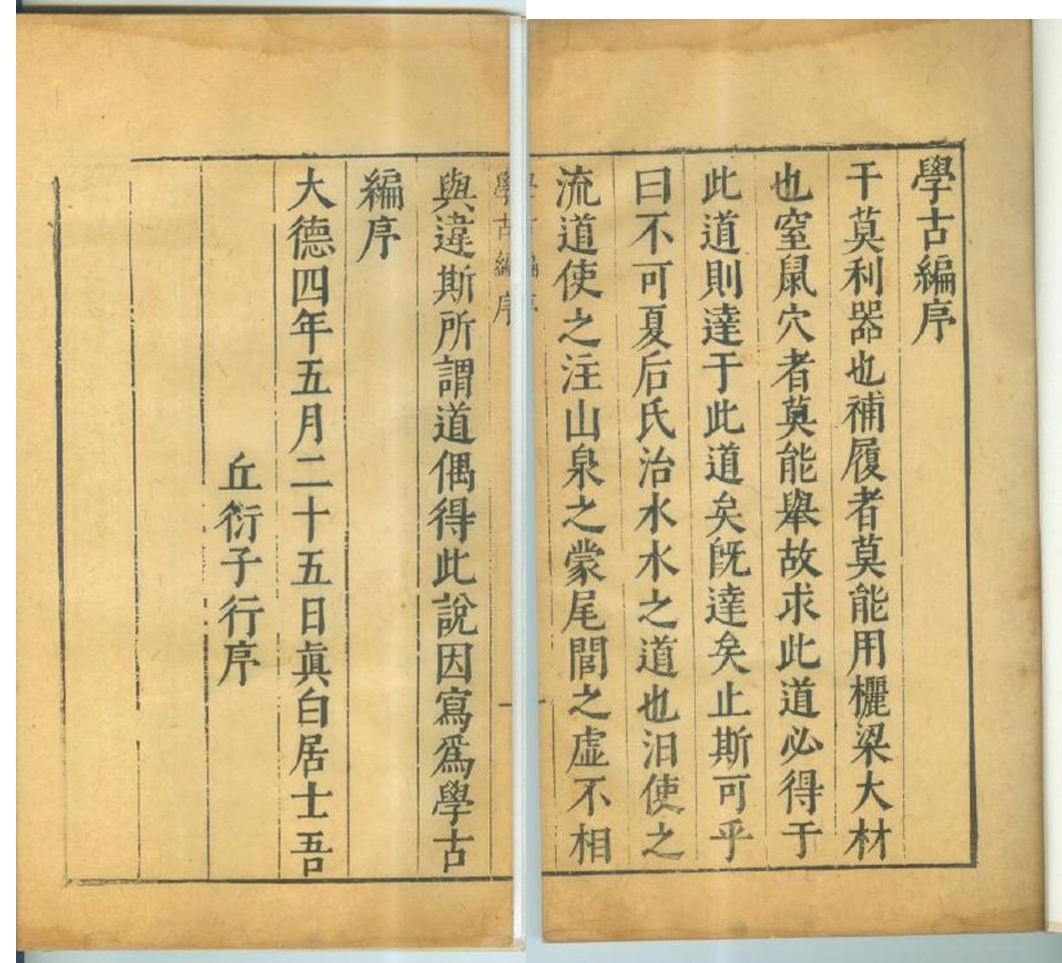
Wu Qiuyan's '學古編' (Learning from the Ancients - Compilation) (Ming Engraved Edition)

=== Epigraphy ===
Wu Qiuyan had a strong passion for classical studies and was well-versed in the writings of various schools of thought found in classical literature. He authored works such as 'Learning from the Ancients - Compilation', '閒居錄' (Diary of a Leisurely Life), '竹素山房詩集' (Poetry collection from the Cottage of Bamboo on the Mountains), and '周秦石刻釋音' (Interpretation of Inscriptions from the Zhou and Qin Dynasties).

'Learning from the Ancients - Compilation' was completed in the year of Da De Geng Zi (1300), and its first volume is known as '三十五舉' (Thirty-Five Entries). This work is one of the earliest Chinese treatises on the theory of seal carving. 'Thirty-Five Entries' constitutes the core of this book, elucidating the evolution and development of seal script and clerical script, as well as the art of seal carving. It contains many of Wu Qiuyan's innovative insights and concepts. Lu Xun, in his work '蛻龕印存' (Reminiscences of Tui Kan), stated, 'The use of seals began in the Zhou and Qin periods,' and later generations 'engraved inscriptions on walls using ancient methods... Wuqiu Zi Xing vigorously advocated Han Dynasty methods... thus, the wind of Er Ya was seen again.'"

Wu Qiuyan's '三十五舉' (Thirty-Five Entries) presented a series of rules for creating seal carvings inspired by Han Dynasty seals, covering aspects such as seal shape, character forms, seal script, and composition. These rules provided a foundation for those in the early stages of seal carving art development who lacked precedents to follow. As Yuan Dynasty scholar Wei Su remarked: 'The publication of this compilation can wash away the common bad habits.' Most Yuan Dynasty designs for imitating Han Dynasty seals adhered to the rules established in '三十五舉.' Many subsequent works on seal studies directly followed the format of '三十五舉,' such as '續學古編' (Sequel to Learning from the Ancients), '續三十五舉' (Sequel to Thirty-Five Entries), '再續三十五舉' (Another Sequel to Thirty-Five Entries), and more, underscoring the profound influence of Wu Qiuyan's '學古編'. Hence, later generations often referred to '學古編' as '三十五舉' and regarded it as a classic in the fields of seal studies and seal carving theory. It is celebrated in the world of seal studies as a 'pillar of the seal carvers,' reviving the art after a period of decline.

=== Art practice of seal engraving ===
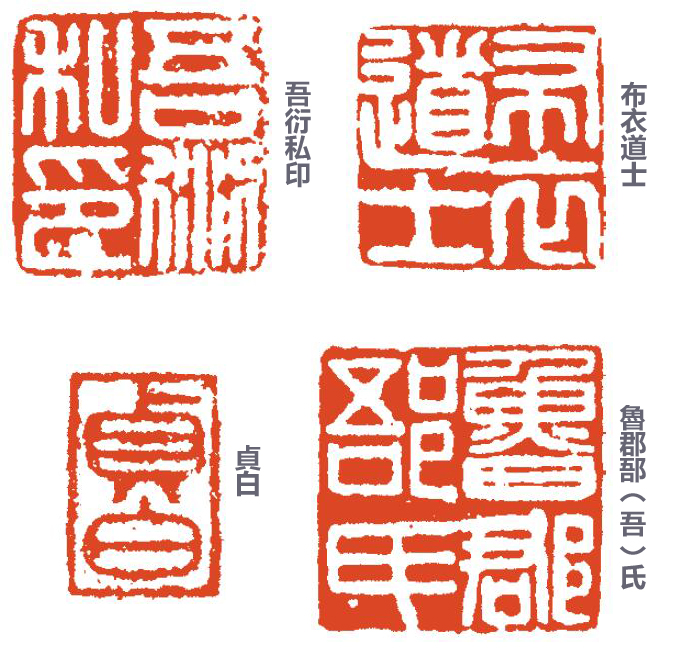
Wu Qiuyan's seal engraving work.

In contrast to the previous practice of following specific concepts and theories of seal engraving when creating imitations of Han Dynasty seals, Wu Qiuyan developed a methodological approach that relied on a foundational understanding of ancient seal principles and used "antiquity" as the guiding criterion for creating imitations of Han Dynasty seals. This methodology reflects the Confucian perspective of "fulfillment as beauty," which is a prevalent aesthetic feature of Han Dynasty seals. In Han Dynasty seals, Chinese characters typically cover the entire surface of the seal, presenting an art form characterized by fullness, simplicity, substance, and dignity.

Han Dynasty seals represent the pinnacle of Chinese seal engraving art in its developmental history, establishing an aesthetic paradigm for seal engraving. Wu Qiuyan, proficient in the Six Scripts of calligraphy, excelled in the clerical and seal scripts. His seal engraving art did not adhere rigidly to established conventions; he used jade chopsticks to engrave characters, resulting in round, smooth, and elegant seal impressions, both in vermilion and white scripts. Concerning the seal script technique for imitating Han Dynasty seals, Wu Qiuyan proposed specific technical guidelines in his "Thirty-Five Principles," emphasizing that "seal script techniques are akin to clerical script" and encouraging "squareness, straightness, avoiding circular shapes, and even when using slanting strokes, one should cleverly write beyond them" as practical techniques in seal engraving art.

When comparing the imitations of Han Dynasty seals by Zhao Mengfu and Wu Qiuyan, it is evident that Zhao seal and his clan seal were significantly influenced by Wu Qiuyan's personal vermilion script seal, showing a tendency towards the characteristics of small seal script.

Wu Qiuyan emphasized the integration of seal engraving theory and practice, with a particular focus on the arrangement of the seal's composition. As a result, his seal engraving art exemplified the simplicity and purity of Han Dynasty seal script techniques. In his work "Thirty-Five Principles", Wu Qiuyan provided specific characteristics of seal engraving art imitating Han Dynasty seals, stating: "In white script seals, the characters must abut the edges; there should be no gaps, as gaps are not in accordance with antiquity... When there are one or two characters in the seal inscription with a natural gap, it should not be filled; many ancient seals have such gaps". He established the fundamental principles for seal engraving practice by studying Han Dynasty seals. His methodology has continued to benefit seal engraving art from his time to the present day, earning him the title of a master in the field of seal studies for generations.

=== Poetry and music ===
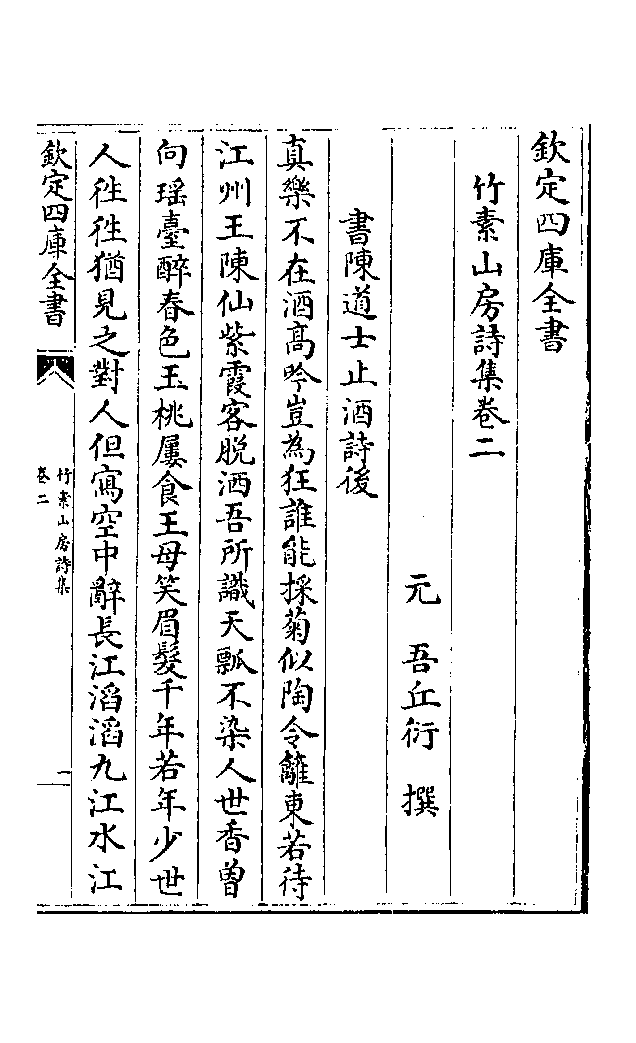
Poetry collection from the Cottage of Bamboo on the Mountains, part of the Complete Library of the Four Treasuries《欽定四庫全書·竹素山房詩集》

In ancient texts, Wu Qiuyan is described as follows: "On moonlit nights, he would hold his bamboo flute, ride on the rooftop, and play. The sound was mournful yet robust". His profound love for music and his creative endeavors in poetry and lyrics were intertwined, accompanying him throughout his life's journey. For example, in one of his poems, he wrote: "Alone, I carry my phoenix flute to the mountain's entrance, the trees brushing against the spring breeze, the grass brushing against my clothes. I dare not play heavenly melodies any longer, for fear of startling the stones into dispersing like drifting clouds". Another poem expresses his admiration for Wang Zijin, depicting scenes of carefree wandering in nature: "I love Wang Zijin, drifting freely through the heavens, dancing with green peaches and playing the flute. As the flowers fall, the city enters autumn". Wu Qiuyan incorporated the story of the Taoist immortal Fugui Gong receiving Wang Zijin as a disciple from "Biographies of Immortals," hinting at his own longing for Daoist cultivation and reflecting his independent and reclusive character.

The "竹素山房詩集" (Poetry collection from the Cottage of Bamboo on the Mountains) written by Wu Qiuyan is rich in content and profound in meaning. One of his poems, titled "丁未歲哀越民," vividly depicts the famine in Jiangsu and Zhejiang provinces during the 11th year of the Yuan Dynasty (1307). The poem describes the suffering of the people, the desolation of the land, and the horrifying scenes of corpses lying in the fields, unburied. It even alludes to the desperate act of cannibalism as people struggled to survive. This poem reflects Wu Qiuyan's deep sympathy for the common people.

In another poem titled "凍解" (Thawing), written in the form of a five-character regulated poem, Wu Qiuyan describes the arrival of spring as the east wind melts the ice. Despite his illness, he expresses his anticipation and love for the beautiful springtime, saying: "The thaw awakens all living beings, and everything in the world becomes new. Longing for clear skies and the morning sun, even in sickness, I cherish this auspicious time. Yao's elegant writings endure, and Zhou's fields and trees welcome spring. My heart is already like this; I need not write like a deity".

In the Qing Dynasty's "四庫全書總目提要" (Annotated Bibliography of the Four Treasuries), the evaluation of Wu Qiuyan's poetry is as follows: "His poetry does not adhere strictly to rules, but his free spirit flows with freshness, cleansing away the dust and dirt of the mundane world, revealing a unique and untamed quality".

=== Collections and works ===
Wu Qiuyan was a highly learned scholar with a deep appreciation for ancient texts and the Hundred Schools of Thought. He was well-versed in various fields, including classics, history, philosophy, and literature, and had a collection of books that reflected his broad knowledge. He lived in seclusion in a small house in Shenghua Lane, where he had a small library on the upper floor. The walls of this library were adorned with various books related to classics, history, and philosophy, all neatly organized.

Wu Qiuyan authored several notable works, including "學古編" (A Compilation of Ancient Learning), "印式" (Seal style, in two volumes), and "閒居錄" (Diary of a Leisurely Life). He also left behind collections of poetry, such as "周秦山房詩集" (Poems from the Cottage in the Zhou and Qin Mountains) and "竹素山房詩集" (Poetry collection from the Cottage of Bamboo on the Mountains). Additionally, he made contributions to musical notation with works like "九歌譜" (Nine Songs) and "十二月樂譜" (Music of the Twelfth Month). Furthermore, he engaged in commentaries and annotations, including "周秦刻石釋音" (Interpretation of the Inscriptions on Zhou and Qin Stone Tablets), "晉文春秋" (Annals of the Spring and Autumn), and "尚書要略" (Summary of the Shangshu), among others.
