= Stone Drums of Qin =

Boulders with ancient Chinese inscriptions

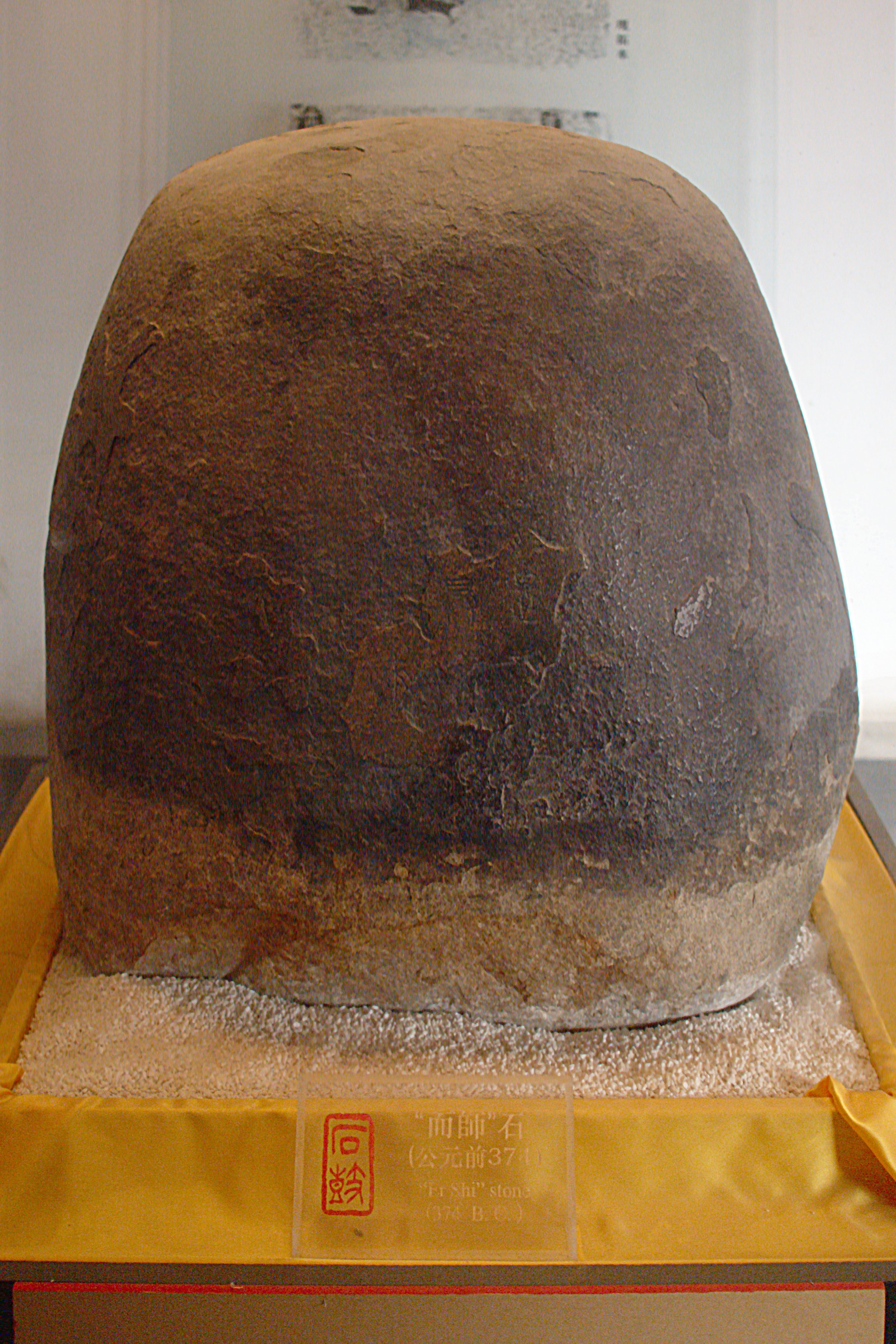
Stone Drum "Er Shi" at Beijing's Palace Museum

The Stone Drums of Qin or Qin Shi Gu (Chinese: 秦石鼓; pinyin: Qín Shígǔ; Wade–Giles: Ch'in Shih Ku) are ten granite boulders bearing the oldest known "stone" inscriptions in ancient Chinese (much older inscriptions on pottery, bronzes and the oracle bones exist). Because these inscribed stones are shaped roughly like drums, they have been known as the Stone Drums of Qin since at least the 7th century.

Their fame is because they are the oldest known stone inscriptions in China, making them a priceless treasure for epigraphers. The stone drums are now kept in the Palace Museum, Beijing. They vary in height from 73 cm to 87.5 cm (with one which was at one point used as a mortar reduced by the grinding to 58 cm), and from 56 to 80.1 cm in diameter. The Stone Drums weigh about 400 kg. each.

== Inscriptions ==
The ancient inscriptions on them are arranged in accordance with each stone's size and proportions, the largest stone bearing fifteen lines of five characters each, and a smaller one with nine lines of eight graphs each, neatly arranged as if in a grid. The contents are generally four-character rhymed verse in the style of the poems of the Classic of Poetry, a few lines of which they even paraphrase. The contents generally commemorate royal hunting and fishing activities.

Originally thought to bear about 700 characters in all, the Stone Drums were already damaged by the time they are mentioned in the Tang dynasty (618–907 CE) poetry of Du Fu. The drums had only 501 graphs by the Song dynasty (960–1279 CE), when the best rubbings now surviving were made (Mattos, p. 57. Cf. Guo Zhongshu). They have been further damaged through rough handling and repeated rubbings in the years since, and one was even converted into a mortar, destroying a third of it. A mere 272 characters are visible on the stones today. In the best rubbing, only 470 of the 501 characters are legible, or about 68% (Mattos p. 122); after omitting repeated graphs, this leaves us with a treasury of 265 different graphs, 49 of which are known from no other source (excluding recognizable variants). Even among recognizable graphs, scores of them are used in ways unattested elsewhere, leading to great difficulty and disagreement in their interpretation, a situation common to Zhou dynasty inscriptions (Mattos p. 122).

== Discovery ==
The Stone Drums are mentioned in the 7th century, and may have been found within the preceding century. There exists no record of their actual discovery, so the date and location thereof are unsettled, and are a matter of extensive scholarly controversy. Wagner (1990) speculates that the original location of the drums' discovery may have been the Qin royal tombs or an associated ritual complex in Fengxiang County, Shaanxi Province, but also mentions another potentially relevant location: a mountain named Mount Shigu (石鼓山), or Stone Drum Mountain, in Chenzang (陳倉), about 25 km. southwest of Yong (Tianxing), the Qin capital from 677 to 383 BCE. Yong's city walls have been found in Fengxiang, and the Qin royal tombs lie about 11 km. to the south.

== Dating ==
Like their discovery, the details of their origin have also long been subject to debate. While most now agree that they were made at the behest of a Duke of the state of Qin, the century of their creation is still uncertain; Mattos (1988) tentatively places them in the 5th century BCE. Chen Zhaorong (2003, p. 9) points out that the style of the Stone Drums script is extremely close to that of the inscriptions on both the Qin Gong Gui (秦公簋, Gui of the Duke of Qin, a bronze tureen) and a stone qing (chime), both belonging to Duke Jing of Qin, who ruled from 576 to 537 BCE. She states that it is very likely that these artifacts date to the same period, and thus dates the Stone Drums to the late Spring and Autumn period.
