= Hangzhou Children's Library =

Public library in Hangzhou, Zhejiang, China

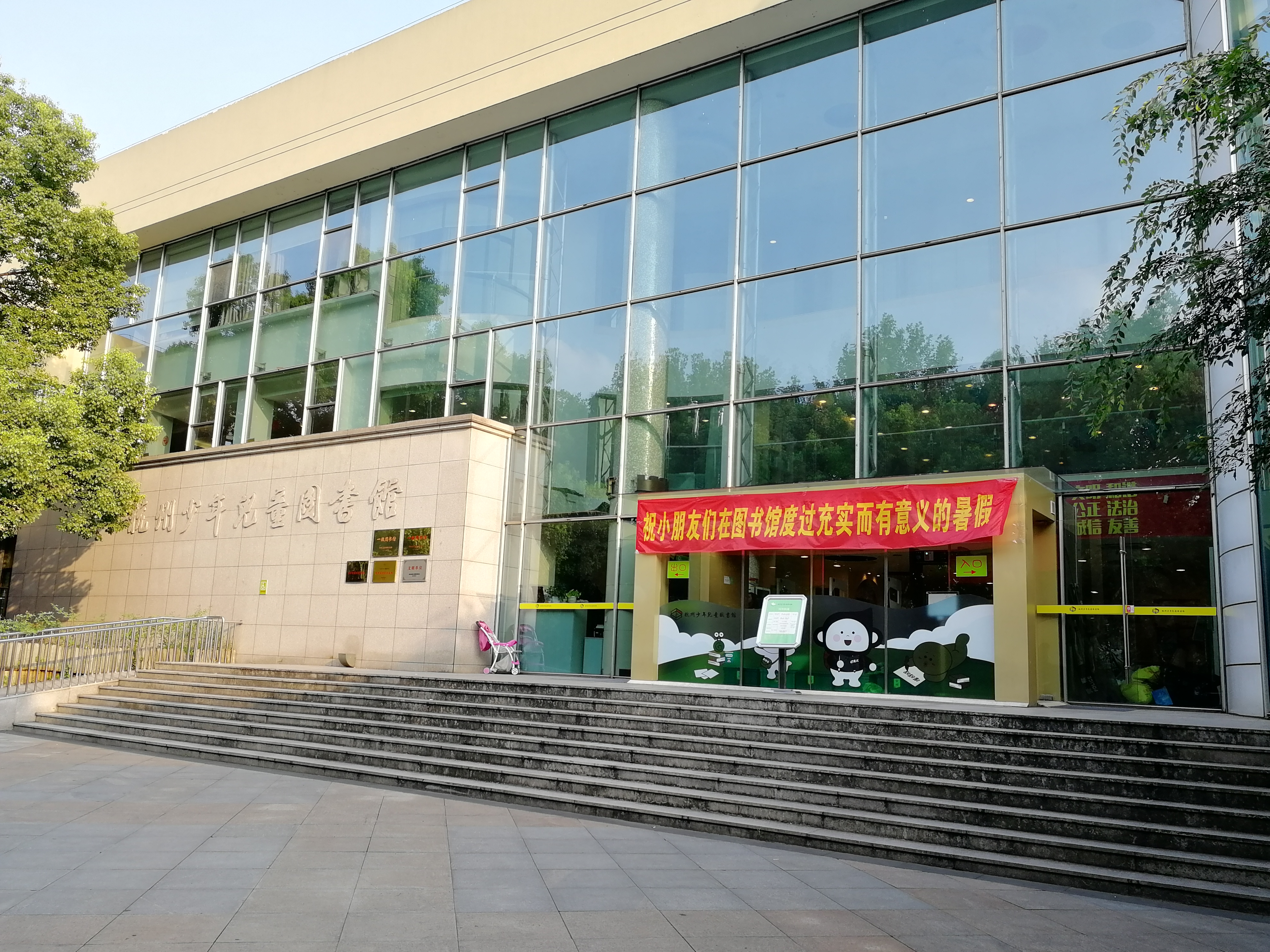
- 30°15′55″N 120°7′49″E
- Location: No. 75, Shuguang Road Xihu District (main building); No. 22-26, Zhongshanzhong Road, Shangcheng District ("Shangshan Home" branch), China
- Type: Public Library
- Established: January 16, 1982

Collection
- Items collected: 370,000^{（2013）}
- Criteria for collection: Chinese Library Classification

Access and use
- Access requirements: Hangzhou Citizen ID; Chinese Resident Identity Card; Alipay

Other information
- Director: Chu Shuqing
- Employees: 46^{（2016）}
- Website: www.hzst.net

Hangzhou Children's Library (Chinese: 杭州少年儿童图书馆), is a public library located in Hangzhou, Zhejiang Province, the People's Republic of China. It is a national first-class library assessed by the Ministry of Culture and Tourism. Founded on January 16, 1982, it was formerly the Children's Reading Room of Xinmin Branch of Zhejiang Library established in 1928. The new main building is located at No. 75 Shuguang Road, Xihu District. The foundation stone was laid on December 31, 1997, and it has been open since June 1, 1999. Covering an area of 5482 square meters. On July 16, 2019, a branch of "Shangshan House" was established on Nansongyu Street, Shangcheng District.

== Buildings ==
=== Main Building ===
The new building located on Shuguang Road was laid on December 31, 1997, and opened on June 1, 1999. Covering an area of 5482 square meters. In May 2010, the main building began to be renovated, and it was reopened in December 2012. The Early Childhood Department was established and began to provide services to preschool children aged 0–6.

=== "Shangshan Home" Branch Library ===
Located at No. 22-26 Zhongshanzhong Road, it covers an area of 432 square meters and has more than 3,000 books available for borrowing. The first floor has small cultural salons, casual dining, and exhibitions; the second floor has dynamic activities such as reading and painting, interactive experiences, and party building leadership.

== Services and facilities ==
=== Collections ===
The library has a collection of more than 370,000 books. In 2016, there were a total of 46 employees in the museum. In 2016, the library received 581,586 readers and borrowed 1,217,471 documents; it held 679 various activities with 89,099 participants.

Since the main library was moved to its current location on Shuguang Road, the classification method of books has been changed from the small and medium-sized classification method to the Chinese Library Classification.

"Monthly 100 recommended new books" and "book borrowing rankings" are launched every month, and special shelves for new books are set up for thematic reading. Pay attention to the reading of picture books, and set up a special shelf for "domestic and foreign picture books" to collect picture books that were originally distributed on literature bookshelves in various countries.

=== Reader Services ===
Hangzhou citizen cards and second-generation ID card holders with citizen cards are automatically enabled to borrow books. Alipay accounts with a Sesame Credit score of 550 or above can also scan the QR code to borrow books. Each card can borrow 20 volumes/pieces of literature (Note: The borrowing limit is 2 sets of audio-visual literature, and the borrowing limit is 10 volumes of animation, picture books and original foreign language books.) . The borrowing period for books is 40 days and for audio-visual documents is 14 days. Starting from April 23, 2019, overdue fees will no longer be incurred when borrowing books overdue.

Books in the main library and the "Shangshanzhijia" branch can be borrowed and returned within the Hangzhou Public Library system.

=== Social Services ===
Hangzhou Children's Library has organized reading and newspaper reading activities for many times, carried out various interest groups and intellectual development training classes for all ages, carried out activities such as book trade-in for new ones and charity sales, and held " "Little Migratory Birds" (children of migrant workers), music and other public welfare summer camps. In 2012, the "Zhejiang Literary Volunteer Service Base" was established in cooperation with the Zhejiang Literary Volunteer Center.

The Yuedu Express project was launched in November 2016. Yuedu Express is a small mobile library with nearly 6,000 books. It travels to multiple schools every week, allowing students in remote schools to borrow books conveniently.

As of the end of 2018, Hangzhou Children's Library has established a total of 66 social education-related outlets in kindergartens, primary and secondary schools, and communities.

== See also ==
- List of libraries in China
