= Yin–Zhou jinwen jicheng =

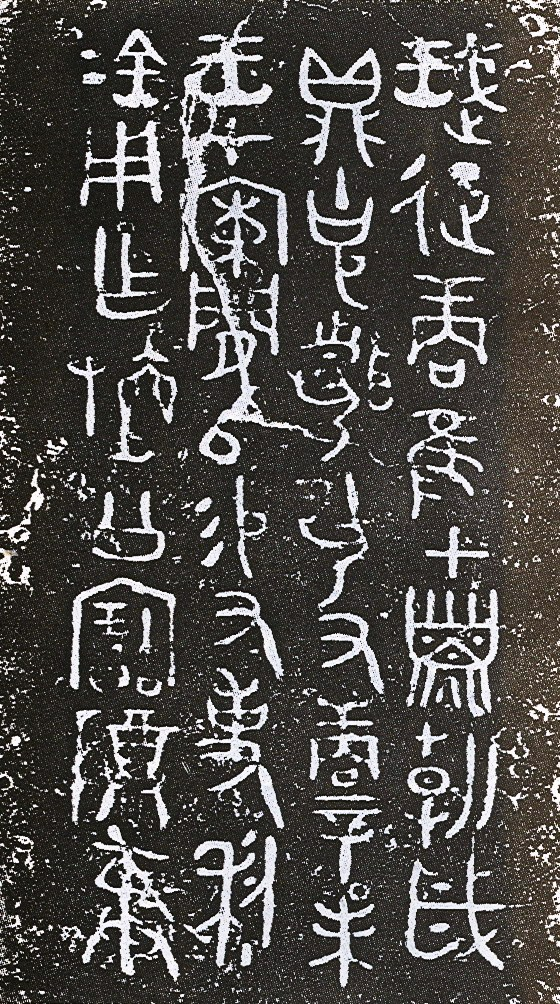
Inscription on the Li gui (Jicheng 4131)

Yin–Zhou jinwen jicheng (Chinese: 殷周金文集成; pinyin: Yīnzhōu jīnwén jíchéng), abbreviated Jicheng or JC, is a standard collection of Chinese bronze inscriptions from the Shang (or Yin) and Zhou dynasties discovered up to 1985. It was published by the Institute of Archaeology, Chinese Academy of Social Sciences between 1984 and 1995. The revised edition, published in 2007, consists of 8 volumes.

The work contains 12,133 rubbings of inscriptions, grouped within 51 vessel types. Within each group, inscriptions are arranged from shortest to longest. Supplementary publications include a concordance and transcription into regular script. A further 1258 inscriptions discovered between 1985 and 1999 are collected in the Jinchu Yin–Zhou jinwen jilu (近出殷周金文集录) published in 2002.
