= Zhejiang Library =

Public library in Hangzhou, China

- 浙江图书馆
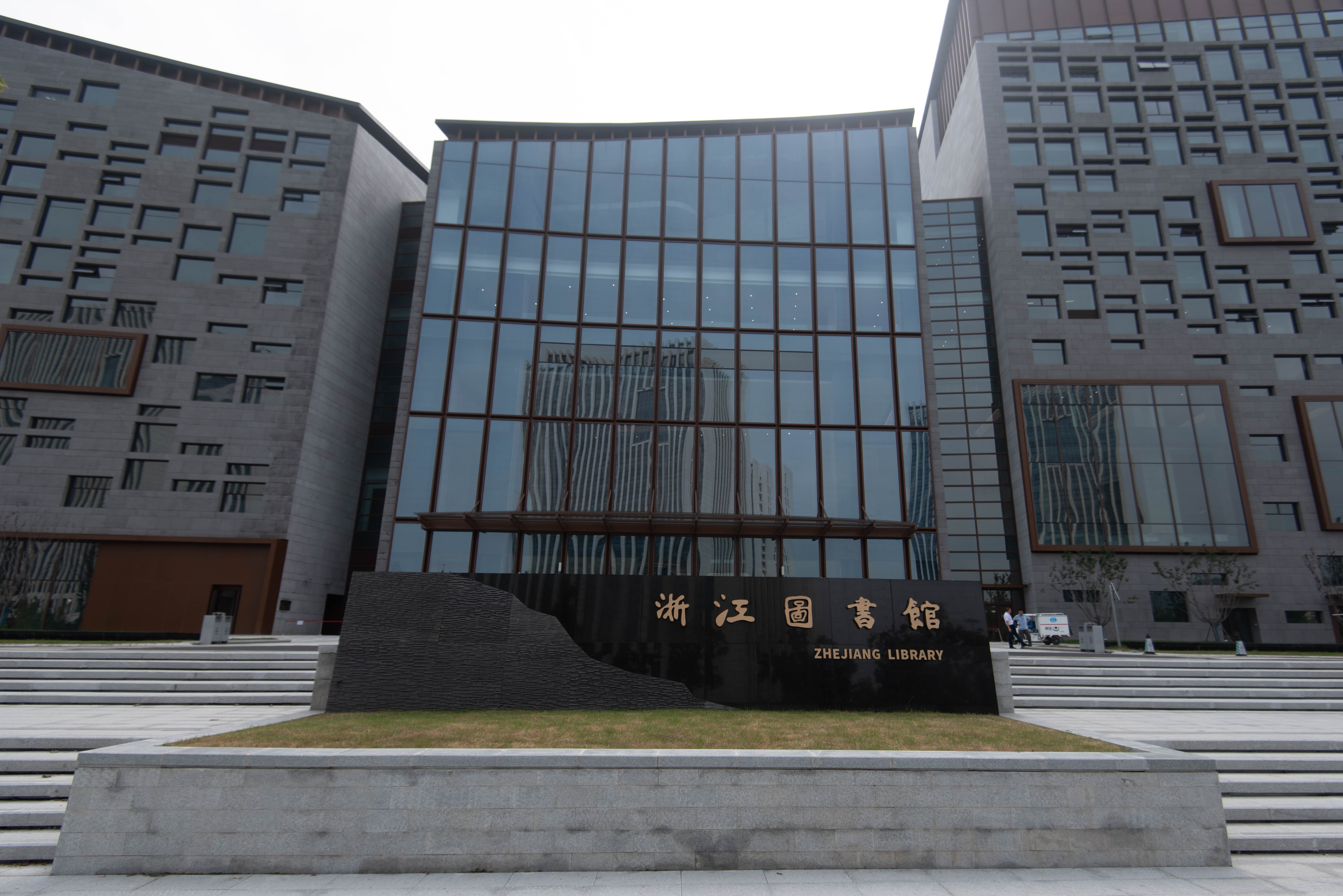
- 30.2654°N 120.1321°E
- Location: Zhijiang Cultural Center, Hangzhou, China; Shangcheng and Xihu District, Hangzhou (older branches), China
- Type: Public library
- Established: 1900

Collection
- Size: 6.73 million volumes (2023)

Other information
- Director: Xu Xiaojun (徐晓军)
- Website: http://www.zjlib.cn

Zhejiang Library (Chinese: 浙江图书馆), sometimes abbreviated as Zhetu (浙图), is a public library in Hangzhou, China. Founded in 1900 during the Qing dynasty, it is among the earliest provincial public libraries in China. It is designated a National First-Class Library and a National Key Ancient Books Preservation and Conservation Institution by the Chinese government. As of 2023, its main facility at the Zhijiang Cultural Center has a building area of 42,000 square meters and a collection of 6.73 million volumes.

== History ==
The library was established in November 1900 during the 26th year of Emperor Guangxu's reign, initiated by Hangzhou gentry including Shao Zhang and Hu Huan. They gained approval from Prefect Zhu Qifeng to open the Hangzhou Library at the former Dongcheng Lecture Hall site, offering free access to local scholars. It began with 718 titles and 9,499 volumes. In 1903, Governor Nie Jigui transformed it into a government-run institution named Zhejiang Library, expanding the collection to 35,000 volumes.

In 1909, during the Qing's Preparative Constitutionalism, Governor Zeng Yun merged it with the Zhejiang Official Printing Bureau, relocating it near Wenlan Pavilion. By 1911, the Siku Quanshu from Wenlan Pavilion was transferred to the library. In 1912, during the Republic of China, the Gushan branch opened, and the library was renamed Zhejiang Provincial Library in 1913.

During the Second Sino-Japanese War, the library moved several times—Jiande (1937), Yongkang (1938), and Lishui (1941)—to protect its collection, including the Siku Quanshu, which was sent to Chongqing. It returned to Hangzhou in 1945. In 1951, the Jiayetang Library collection merged with it, and in 1998, a new main building opened on Shuguang Road. The Zhijiang branch opened in August 2023 within the Zhijiang Cultural Center.

== Facilities ==
The library operates various facilities in Hangzhou and Huzhou:

- Shuguang Road (Main Library): Located at No. 73 Shuguang Road, Xihu District, it spans 34,000 square meters and can hold 4.5 million volumes.
- Gushan Road (Ancient Books Division): At No. 28 Gushan Road, it includes the White Pavilion (built 1911–1912) and Red Pavilion for pre-1949 materials.
- University Road: At No. 102 University Road, Shangcheng District, it serves as a reading room, built in 1929–1931.
- Jiayetang Library: In Nanxun, it preserves historical collections.
- The Zhijiang branch, opened in 2023, currently holds 300,000 volumes, with plans to expand to 6 million.

== Collection ==
The library’s collection exceeds 6.73 million volumes, including the Siku Quanshu Wenlan Pavilion edition and rare editions from the Song, Yuan, and Ming dynasties. It also holds Dunhuang manuscripts and foreign editions from Japan and Korea.

== Research and Publishing ==
The library has published journals such as Wenlan Journal and Library Outlook since 1935, focusing on traditional scholarship and general readership, respectively. In 1936, it hosted the Zhejiang Document Exhibition, displaying over 20,000 items.

== See also ==
- Hangzhou Children's Library
- Hangzhou Library
- List of libraries in China
