= Padarath =

Four spiritual treasures within Sikhism

Padarath (Punjabi: ਪਦਾਰਥੁ, lit. 'treasure, wealth') is used in Sikhism for a "step of spiritual Enlightenment." In the Guru Granth Sahib, the term padarath is used for temporal, as well as spiritual, attainments.

== Description ==
There are four "Spiritual Treasures" in Sikhism, known as the Char Padarath (Punjabi: ਚਾਰਿ ਪਦਾਰਥੁ; "four human pursuits"):

1. Gyaan Padarath (ਗਿਆਨੁ ਪਦਾਰਥੁ) — Treasure of Wisdom
2. Mukti Padarath (ਮੁਕਤਿ ਪਦਾਰਥੁ) — Treasure of Liberation
3. Naam Padarath (ਨਾਮੁ ਪਦਾਰਥੁ) — Treasure of Supreme Command (Wisdom from Divine)
4. Janam Padarath (ਜਨਮੁ ਪਦਾਰਥੁ) — Treasure of Living (Supreme Enlightenment)

According to Guru Arjan Dev, if a soul attains Naam Padarath, he gets Janam Padarath automatically. In the Guru Granth Sahib, he mentioned in a salok, "O Nanak, if I am blessed with the Naam, I live, and my body and mind blossom forth." (Note: Guru Arjan Dev, Guru Granth Sahib, p. 1429, line 16: ਨਾਨਕ ਨਾਮੁ ਮਿਲੈ ਤਾਂ ਜੀਵਾਂ ਤਨੁ ਮਨੁ ਥੀਵੈ ਹਰਿਆ ॥੧॥) Only the liberated soul can achieve Naam Padarath. The liberation (Mukat Padarath) is attained by accepting wisdom of Guru (Gyan Padarath) and applicable in one's lifestyle. Guru Amar Das states "Through the Spiritual wisdom, the Gurmukh is liberated." (Note: Guru Amar Das, Guru Granth Sahib, p. 117: ਗੁਰਮੁਖਿ ਗਿਆਨੁ ਨਾਮਿ ਮੁਕਤਿ ਹੋਈ ॥) All the above tasks are categorized under Hari Ki Seva (Pleasing the one God). (Note: Guru Granth Sahib, p. 108, line 6: ਚਾਰਿ ਪਦਾਰਥ ਹਰਿ ਕੀ ਸੇਵਾ ॥ [The four cardinal blessings are obtained by serving the Lord.] ਪਰਮਾਤਮਾ ਦੀ ਸੇਵਾ-ਭਗਤੀ ਹੀ (ਦੁਨੀਆ ਦੇ ਪ੍ਰਸਿਧ) ਚਾਰ ਪਦਾਰਥ ਹਨ।)

As per Mahankosh, Padarath is a "noun" means a thing or precious thing and as per Hindu Puranas, there are four Padarath which are Dharma, Artha, Kama and Moksha.

According to Harbans Singh, Char Padarath is the Sikh gurus reenvisionment and reinterpretation of the concept of Puruṣārtha of Hinduism.

== See also ==
- Puruṣārtha, a similar concept in Hinduism
- Barry Padarath, Trinidad and Tobago politician
