= Siku Quanshu Zongmu Tiyao =

Annotated catalog related to the Siku Quanshu

- Traditional Chinese: 四庫全書總目提要
- Simplified Chinese: 四库全书总目提要
- Literal meaning: Annotated Bibliography of the Complete Library of the Four Treasuries
Transcriptions
Standard Mandarin
- Hanyu Pinyin: Sìkù Quánshū Zǒngmù Tíyào
- Wade–Giles: Ssu-k'u Ch'üan-shu Tsung-mu T'i-yao

The Siku Quanshu Zongmu Tiyao, or the Annotated Bibliography of the Four Treasuries, is an annotated catalog of the thousands of works that were considered for inclusion in the Siku Quanshu (Complete Library of the Four Treasuries). It is the largest pre-modern Chinese book catalog, containing bibliographic notices on all 3,461 works included in the Complete Library of the Four Treasuries, as well as shorter notes on 6,793 works that were not included in the imperial library but listed only by title (cunmu 存目).

Work for the 200-chapter catalog began in 1773 and was completed in 1798. Thousands of books are omitted from the catalog, including the almost 3,000 works that were destroyed by the Qing because they were considered to be anti-Manchu. The notices themselves were written by many hands, but the final drafts were edited by chief editor Ji Yun. The content of the annotated catalog reflects the strength of Han learning in Qing scholarly circles.

== Name ==
The Siku Quanshu Zongmu Tiyao (simplified Chinese: 四库总目总目提要; traditional Chinese: 四庫總目總目提要; pinyin: Sìkù Quánshū Zǒngmù Tíyào, literally "Annotated Bibliography of the Complete Library of the Four Treasuries") or simply the Siku Zongmu (simplified Chinese: 四库总目; traditional Chinese: 四庫總目; pinyin: Sìkù Zǒngmù, literally "Catalog of the Four Treasuries") in Chinese. It is also translated in English as the Annotated Bibliography of the Four Treasuries (or the Annotated Bibliography of the Four Treasures).

== See also ==
- Wu Qiuyan

== Notes and references ==
- Wilkinson, Endymion (2000). Chinese History: A Manual. Harvard University Asia Center. ISBN 9780674002470.
- Guy, R. Kent (1987). The Emperor's Four Treasuries: Scholars and the State in the Late Ch'ien-lung Era. Council on East Asian Studies, Harvard University. ISBN 9780674251151.
