= Clerical script =

Chinese script widely used in the Han dynasty

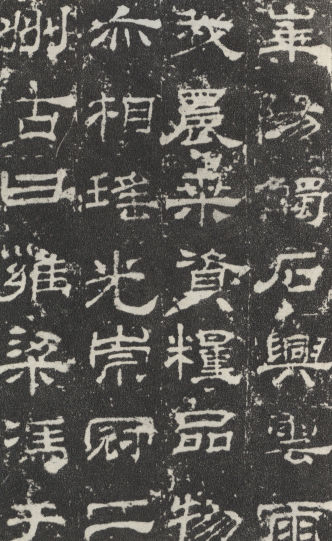
- Stele of Huashan Temple, written in the clerical script from the late Eastern Han dynasty
- Script type: Logographic
- Period: Bronze Age China, Iron Age China
- Direction: Vertical writing
- Languages: Old Chinese, Eastern Han Chinese

Related scripts
- Parent systems: Oracle bone script: Seal script; Clerical script
- Child systems: Regular script

Clerical script
- Chinese characters for 'clerical script' in regular (left) and clerical script (right).

Chinese name
- Traditional Chinese: 隸書
- Simplified Chinese: 隶书
- Literal meaning: clerical script
Transcriptions
Standard Mandarin
- Hanyu Pinyin: lìshū
- Bopomofo: ㄌㄧˋ ㄕㄨ
- Wade–Giles: li^{4}-shu^{1}
Yue: Cantonese
- Jyutping: dai6 syu1

Vietnamese name
- Vietnamese: lệ thư, chữ lệ
- Hán-Nôm: 隸書, 𡨸隸

Korean name
- Hangul: 예서
- Hanja: 隸書
Transcriptions
- Revised Romanization: yeseo
- McCune–Reischauer: yesŏ

Japanese name
- Kanji: 隷書体
- Kana: れいしょたい
Transcriptions
- Romanization: reishotai

The clerical script (traditional Chinese: 隸書; simplified Chinese: 隶书; pinyin: lìshū), sometimes also chancery script, is a style of Chinese writing that evolved from the late Warring States period to the Qin dynasty. It matured and became dominant in the Han dynasty, and remained in active use through the Six Dynasties period. In its development, it departed significantly from the earlier scripts in terms of graphic structures (a process known as libian), and was characterized by its rectilinearity, a trait shared with the later regular script.

Although it was succeeded by the later scripts, including the regular script, the clerical script is preserved as a calligraphic practice. In Chinese calligraphy, the term clerical often refers to a specific calligraphic style that is typical of a subtype of the clerical script, the Han clerical (汉隶; 漢隸) or bafen (八分) script. This style is characterized by the squat character shapes, and its "wavy" appearance due to the thick, pronounced and slightly downward tails that are up-tilted at the ends.

== History ==
=== Origin ===
Historical accounts, including the Book of Han (111 CE) and the postface of Shuowen Jiezi (c. 100 CE), mistakenly attribute the clerical script to Qin dynasty clerks, claiming that the clerks had devised the script to cope with the heavy workload. There are also historical traditions dating back to the Han dynasty which attributed the creation of clerical script specifically to a Qin-dynasty prison officer, Cheng Miao (程邈), who was said to have invented it at the behest of Qin Shi Huang. However, archaeological findings have shown that the clerical script was not the invention by a certain person or certain people, but was evolved naturally from the earlier scripts. It has also been argued that, rather than being established by government scribes, clerical script was already in popular use, and its use by clerks in the Qin dynasty merely reflects this trend.

The clerical script was developed from the local script varieties in the state of Qin in the Warring States period. These scripts are said to belong to the Qin-state script system (秦系文字; 'Qin-branch scripts'), and were the basis on which the Qin small seal script was standardized. The folk varieties of the Qin-state scripts can be seen to already have employed shapes that are more rectilinear than in the more orthodox scripts, with less long, sinuous lines and more readily segmented strokes, and are closer to the later clerical script than to the small seal script in both style and structure. In particular, some scripts discovered on bamboo and wooden slips are stylistically distinct from the earlier and even contemporary Qin-state scripts, and thus are often seen as a form of early clerical script. Examples include the Shuihudi Qin bamboo texts (c. 217 BCE), and the Qingchuan wooden slips (c. 309 BCE).

=== Maturation ===
In the Qin dynasty, the official script was the small seal script. The clerical script was associated with low social status, and, although allowed as a sort of auxiliary writing style for clerks, was generally not used in formal occasions. However, it gradually assumed dominance over the small seal script over time, and had become the main script in use in the Han dynasty. Over the course of the Han dynasty, the clerical scripts continued to mature and stabilize, finally arriving at a visually unique style. This style is characterized by the following points:

- Characters are typically wider than they are tall;
- The rightward-falling stroke often has a heavy foot that is slightly up-tilted at the end;
- The horizontal stroke also occasionally has a thick, downward dropping tail with a slightly up-tilted end, typically when it is one of the longer horizontally-directed strokes in a character.

The last two features above are sometimes called the 'wavy propensity' (simplified Chinese: 波势; traditional Chinese: 波勢) or 'wavy downward strokes' (波磔). Additionally, the leftward-falling strokes and anticlockwise curves also tend to have upward tilted ends.

Clerical scripts before the formation of these features are often called Qin clerical script (秦隶; 秦隸) or 'old script' (古隶; 古隸), which include the early clerical scripts from the late Warring States period to the early Han dynasty. Clerical scripts with these features are called 'Han script' (汉隶; 漢隸) or bafen (八分) script. The style of bafen script is the basis of most of the later clerical-style calligraphy.

The most mature form of the bafen script can be found in the late Eastern Han dynasty, with "carefully and neatly executed" inscriptions on stelae. These stelae are regarded as calligraphic works of great significance, and are often used as models of clerical-style calligraphy. Some important inscriptions include:

- 西嶽華山廟碑, abbr. 華山碑 or 華山廟碑, The Stele of Huashan Temple;
- 漢魯相乙瑛請置孔廟百石卒史碑, abbr. 乙瑛碑, The Stele of Yi Ying;
- 郃陽令曹全碑, abbr. 曹全碑, The Stele of Cao Quan;
- 漢故穀城長盪陰令張君表頌, abbr. 張遷碑, The Stele of Zhang Qian

=== Transition to neo-clerical ===
A new type of clerical script, for which Chinese palaeographer Qiu Xigui termed the name "neo-clerical" (simplified Chinese: 新隶体; traditional Chinese: 新隸體), arose in the Eastern Han dynasty. The script, for convenience, abandoned the heavy tails present in the bafen script, while taking influence from the contemporaneous cursive script. Influenced by this new script style, the semi-cursive script would then arise, which would in turn give rise to the regular script. The neo-clerical form, or an intermediate form of the neo-clerical and the semi-cursive forms, is said to have become the way the common people wrote by the Six Dynasties period. By the Northern and Southern dynasties, the regular script had succeeded the clerical script and become the principal script in use.

=== As a calligraphic practice ===
After the Northern and Southern dynasties, the clerical script was no longer actively in use, but its style survived in calligraphy.

In the Tang dynasty, calligraphers including Han Zemu (韓擇木), Shi Weize (史惟則), Li Chao (李潮) and Cai Youlin (蔡有鄰) were renowned for their clerical calligraphy. From the Tang to the Ming dynasties, calligraphers occasionally wrote in clerical style as well.

The Qing dynasty saw a revival in clerical-style calligraphy, with notable calligraphers such as Jin Nong, Deng Shiru, Yi Bingshou (伊秉綬) and Zheng Fu (鄭簠).

=== Modern use ===
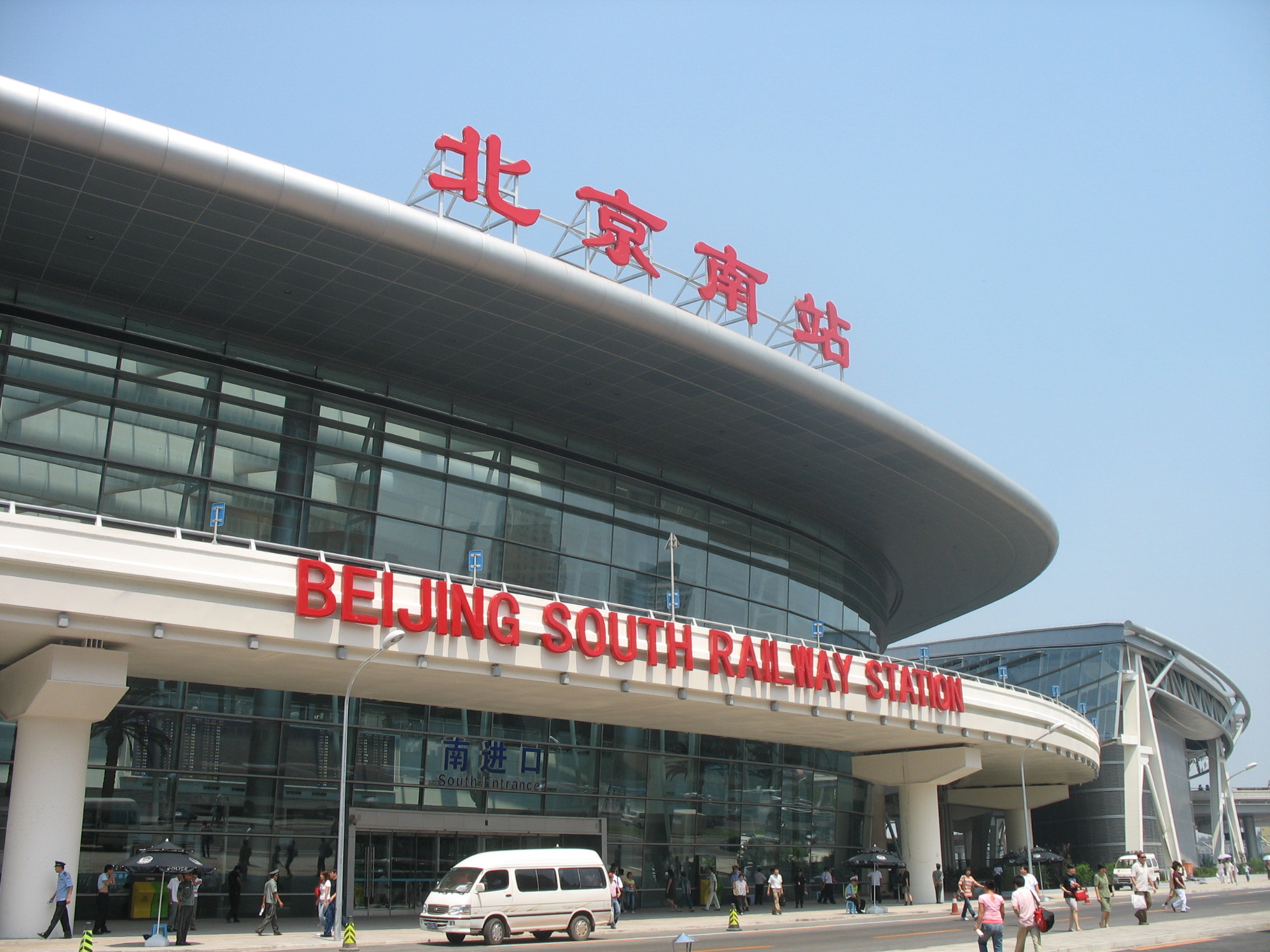
Beijing South Railway Station, which uses a clerical-style font

Due to its high legibility to modern readers, the clerical-style calligraphy is still used for artistic flavor in a variety of functional applications such as headlines, logos, signboards, and advertisements.

There are a number of computer fonts that display CJK characters in the clerical style.

== Names ==
The etymology of the Chinese name for the clerical script (隸書) is uncertain. 隸 has been explained as 徒隸 ('prisoner-in-servitude") or Chinese: 隸人 'convict', 'official of a low rank'. Some infer that the script was used in recording the affairs related to such prisoners, while others infer that it was used by prisoners conscripted as scribes.

Clerical script is also known as 'clerical characters' (隸字), 'assistant writing' (佐書), 'historical writing' (史書), and "official script".

=== Historical nomenclature ===
From the Northern and Southern dynasties to the Tang dynasty, the regular script was still sometimes referred to as 隸書 instead of 楷書. To distinguish from the Han-dynasty clerical script proper, it was also referred to as the 'recent clerical script' (今隶; 今隸). The Han-dynasty clerical script might accordingly be called the 'old clerical script' (古隸), which is now also the name for the early clerical scripts before the bafen development.

== See also ==
- Wu Qiuyan
