= Siku Quanshu =

18th-century Chinese encyclopedia

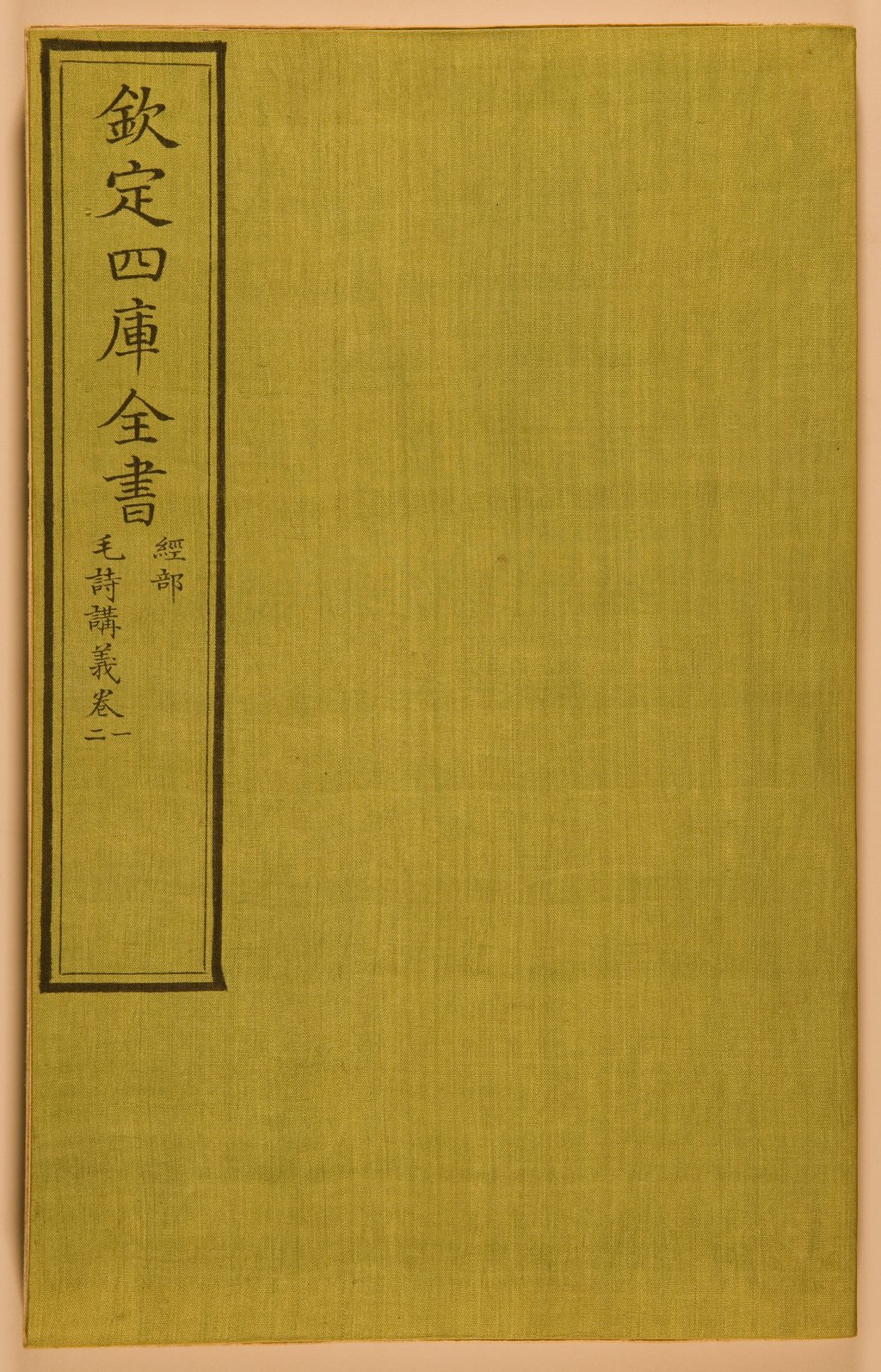

Chinese name
- Traditional Chinese: 四庫全書
- Simplified Chinese: 四库全书
- Literal meaning: "Complete Books of the Four Repositories"
Transcriptions
Standard Mandarin
- Hanyu Pinyin: Sìkù Quánshū
- Wade–Giles: Ssŭ^{4}-k'u^{4} Ch'üan^{2}-shu^{1}
- IPA: [sɹ̩̂.kʰû tɕʰɥɛ̌n.ʂú]
Yue: Cantonese
- Yale Romanization: Seifu Chyùhnsyū
- Jyutping: Sei3-fu3 cyun4-syu1
- IPA: [sej˧.fu˧ tsʰyn˩.sy˥]

Manchu name
- Manchu script: ᡩᡠᡳᠨ ᠨᠠᠮᡠᠨ ᠢ᠋ ᠶᠣᡠᠨᡳ ᠪᡳᡨᡥᡝ
- Möllendorff: duin namun i yooni bithe

The Siku Quanshu, literally the Complete Library of the Four Treasuries, is a Chinese encyclopedia commissioned during the Qing dynasty by the Qianlong Emperor. Commissioned in 1772 and completed in 1782, the Siku quanshu is the largest collection of books in imperial Chinese history, comprising 36,381 volumes, 79,337 manuscript rolls, 2.3 million pages, and about 997 million words. The complete encyclopedia contains an annotated catalogue of 10,680 titles along with a compendium of 3,593 titles. The Siku Quanshu surpassed the 1403 Yongle Encyclopedia created by the previous Ming dynasty, which had been China's largest encyclopedia. Complete copies of the Siku Quanshu are held at the National Library of China in Beijing, the National Palace Museum in Taipei, the Gansu Library in Lanzhou, and the Zhejiang Library in Hangzhou.

== Compilation ==
=== Creation ===
The Qianlong Emperor of the Qing dynasty ordered the creation of the Siku Quanshu in 1772. Local and provincial officers were put in charge of locating and collecting important books, and the emperor encouraged owners of rare or valuable books to send them to the capital. At first, few did, because of concerns about the Literary Inquisition, but towards the end of 1772 the emperor issued a decree stating that books would be returned to their owners once the compilation was finished and that the owners would not be punished if their books contained Anti-Qing sentiment. Less than three months after the issue of this decree, four to five thousand books were handed in.

By March 1773, an editorial board composed of hundreds of editors, collators, and copyists had been created in Beijing to gather and review books brought to them. This board included more than 361 scholars, with Ji Yun and Lu Xixiong (陸錫熊) as chief editors. Around 3,826 scribes copied every word by hand. They were not paid in cash, but each was given a government position after he had transcribed a set number of sections of the encyclopedia. Following its ten-year-long compilation, seven copies were produced of the completed encyclopedia, which were distributed throughout the empire.

By 1782, the Siku Quanshu Zongmu Tiyao ('Annotated Bibliography of the Four Treasuries'), a guide to the Siku Quanshu, had also been completed. It contains bibliographical information about the 3,593 titles in the Siku Quanshu and about 6,793 other books that were not included in it. The Annotated Bibliography of the Four Treasuries, which was published in 1793, became the largest Chinese book catalog of the time.

=== Compilation ===
The initial compilation of the Siku Quanshu started with the Siku Quanshu Zongmu Tiyao bibliography, which was completed by 1773. The first workable drafts were completed in 1781. These included bibliographical information on all the works included in the Siku Quanshu in full as well as a large number of works that are mentioned only by title.

As indicated by its title, the work is structured in four categories, which reference the divisions of the imperial library:

- "Classics" (經; jīng), the canon ramified by Confucius and traditional since the Han dynasty (202 BC – 220 AD)
- "Histories" (史; shǐ)
- "Letters" (集; jí), containing literature such as poetry and personal letters, and writings meant for the masses
- "Masters" (子; zǐ), whose texts focus on philosophy, arts, and sciences.

In the course of editing, a large number of corrections were made to local records. Personal documents, often describing the actions of noteworthy local people, were often included in the Annotated Bibliography of the Four Treasuries if their contents could be verified through central government records. In the Siku Quanshu itself, documents that could not be verified were often included by title only. Even officially sponsored writings, such as local gazetteers, were not safe from the scrutiny of the compilers.

Medical knowledge was often documented through case studies, on the model of twenty-five instances in Sima Qian's Records of the Grand Historian, which blended narrative with analysis. Similarly, works on philosophy took Huang Zongxi's writings as their model, though they came to be divided into two types: "archival", meaning scholarly articles, and "cultural", meaning Buddhist koans. Because authors and previous compilers had not considered philosophical works to form part of historical records, the compilers of the Siku Quanshu redefined the classifications in several compilations and set boundaries based on authors' biographies and the purposes of their writings.

The Qianlong Emperor reviewed many of the works that were being compiled, and his opinions were conveyed through direct comments or imperial edicts. These colored the compilers' criteria for works suitable for inclusion in the Siku Quanshu, especially in relation to works expressing anti-Qing sentiments. This can be exemplified in the compilers' handling of the story of Zhang Shicheng and his rival Zhu Yuanzhang. The Qianlong Emperor sought to discredit the Ming dynasty by highlighting the cruelty of its early rulers and contrasting it with the policies of his the Qing. The compilers did not see Zhang Shicheng's rule as legitimate, but as a natural response to the tyranny imposed on the people under the Ming.

=== Distribution ===
The Qianlong Emperor commissioned seven copies of the Siku Quanshu. The first four copies were for the emperor himself and were kept in the north, in specially constructed libraries in the Forbidden City, Old Summer Palace, Shenyang, and Chengde. The remaining three copies were sent to the south, where they deposited in libraries in the cities of Hangzhou, Zhenjiang, and Yangzhou. All seven libraries also received copies of the imperial encyclopedia Complete Classics Collection of Ancient China, completed in 1725.

The copy kept in the Old Summer Palace was destroyed during the Second Opium War in 1860. The two copies kept in Zhenjiang and Yangzhou were also completely destroyed, while the copy kept in Hangzhou was only about 70 to 80 percent destroyed during the Taiping Rebellion. The four remaining copies suffered some damage during the Second Sino-Japanese War. Today, those copies are located in the National Library of China in Beijing, the National Palace Museum in Taipei, the Gansu Provincial Library in Lanzhou, and the Zhejiang Library in Hangzhou.

=== Censorship ===
It is said that the Qianlong Emperor did not keep his promise to return books to their owners. Any books that did not make it into the Siku Quanshu risked becoming part of the Siku Jinshu (四庫禁書), a catalogue of over 2,855 books that were rejected and banned during the completion of the Siku Quanshu. An additional four to five hundred books were also edited or censored. The majority of the books that were banned had been written towards the end of the Ming dynasty and contained anti-Qing sentiment. The Siku Jinshu was partially the Qianlong Emperor's attempt to rid China of any remaining Ming loyalists by executing scholars and burning any books that made direct or implicit political attacks on the Manchu people. However, it has been also pointed out that most works banned under the Qing's censorship have been preserved, whereas most of the works lost were not among those prohibited.

== Contents ==
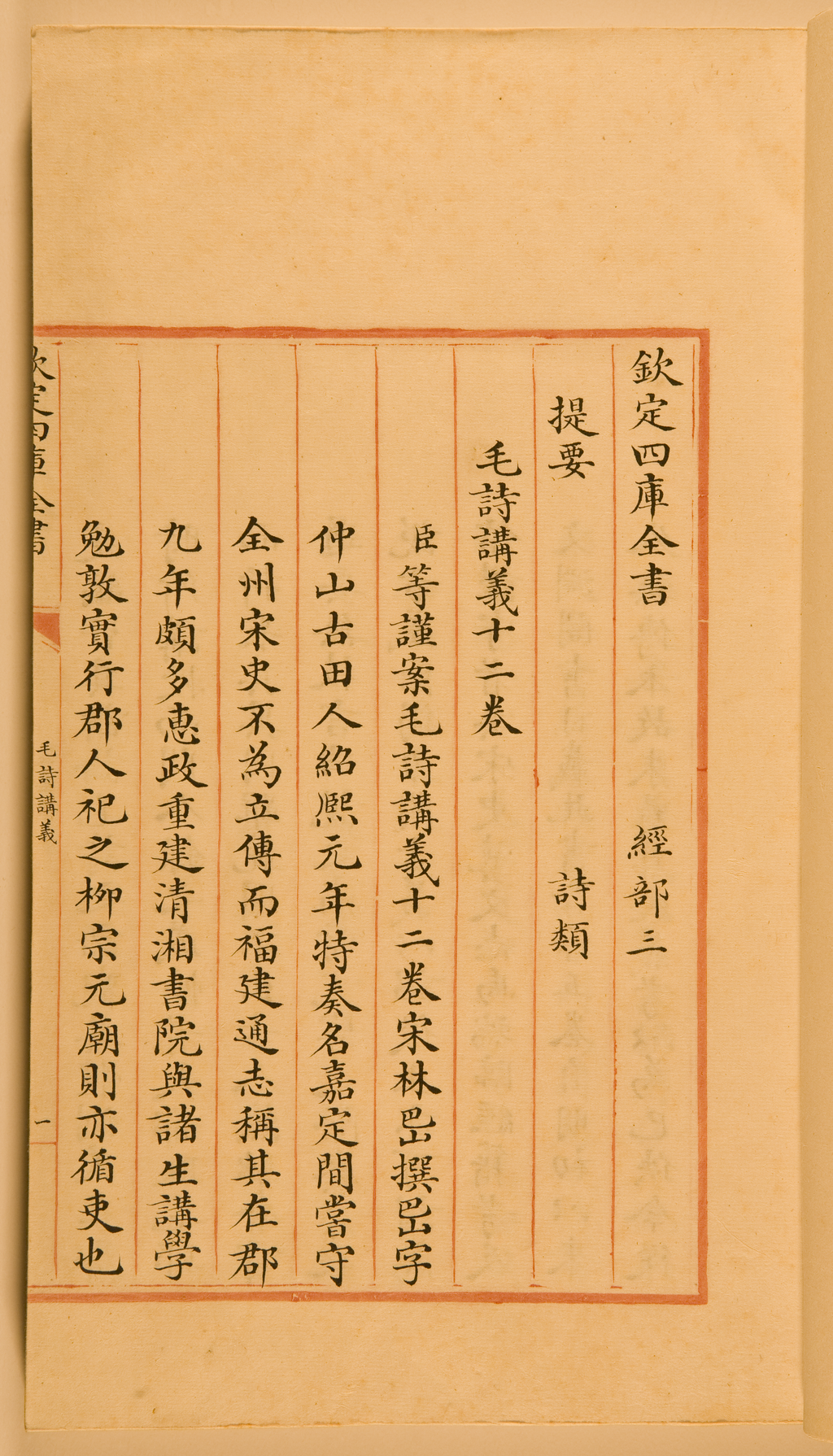
A page from the Siku Quanshu

Each copy of the Siku Quanshu was bound into 36,381 volumes (册; cè), with more than 79,000 volumes (卷; juàn). In total, each copy is around 2.3 million pages, and has approximately 800 million Chinese characters.

=== Catalogue ===
The scholars working on the Siku Quanshu wrote a descriptive note for each book, detailing the author's name along with place and year of birth. Next, after they determined what parts of the author's work would go into the compilation, they analyzed the main points of the author's argument. This short annotation, which reflected their own opinions, was put at the beginning of the Siku Quanshu and formed the Complete Catalogue. The catalogue divided the Siku Quanshu into its four sections (庫; kù; 'repository').

=== Subcategories ===
The books are divided into 44 subcategories (类; 類; lèi). The Siku Quanshu includes most major Chinese texts, from pre-Classical Zhou dynasty works like the I Ching to those written during the Qing. Included within the 44 subcategories are the Analects of Confucius, Mencius, the Great Learning, the Doctrine of the Mean, the I Ching, the Rites of Zhou, the Classic of Rites, the Classic of Poetry, the Spring and Autumn Annals, the Shuowen Jiezi, the Records of the Grand Historian, the Zizhi Tongjian, The Art of War, the Guoyu, Stratagems of the Warring States, the Compendium of Materia Medica, and other classics.

== See also ==
- Libraries in China
- Four Great Books of Song
- Literary inquisition
