= List of kanji radicals by stroke count =

Kanji radicals are graphemes, or graphical parts, that are used in organizing Japanese kanji in dictionaries. They are derived from the 214 Chinese Kangxi radicals.

== Table key ==
The following table shows the 214 Kangxi radicals, which are derived from 47,035 characters.

The frequency list is derived from the 47,035 characters in the Chinese language.

The Jōyō frequency is from the set of 2,136 Jōyō kanji.

Top 25% means that this radical represents 25% of Jōyō kanji. Top 50% means that this radical plus the Top 25% represent 50% of Jōyō kanji. Top 75% means that this radical plus the Top 50% represent 75% of Jōyō kanji.

Many radicals are not commonly written by themselves so people wouldn't know the technical hiragana reading given here. The simplified table of Japanese kanji radicals page only lists common readings.

== Table of radicals ==
No.	Radical (variants)	Stroke count	Meaning and reading	Frequency	Jōyō freq	Examples	Group
1	一	1	one (いち, ichi; 一)	42	50	七三丈不丘世	
2	丨	1	line, stick (ぼう, bō; 棒)	21		中	
3	丶	1	dot (てん, ten; 点)	10		丸主	
4	丿	1	bend, possessive particle no (の, no; ノ)	33		久之乎	
5	乙 (乚)	1	second, latter (おつ, otsu; 乙)	42		九也	
6	亅	1	hook, hooked stick (はねぼう, hanebō; 撥棒)	19		了事	
7	二	2	two (に, ni; 二)	29		五井些亞	
8	亠	2	pot lid (なべぶた, nabebuta; 鍋蓋)	38		亡交京	
9	人 (亻,𠆢)	2	human (ひと, hito; 人)	794	83	仁休位今	Top 25%
10	儿	2	legs, human underneath (にんにょう, ninnyō; 人繞)	52		兄元	
11	入 (𠆢)	2	enter (いる, iru; 入)	28		入全兩	
12	八 (ハ)	2	eight, eight-head (はちがしら, hachigashira; 八頭)	44		公六共兵	
13	冂	2	inverted box, window frame (まきがまえ, makigamae; 牧構)	50		内再	
14	冖	2	cover, wa crown (わかんむり, wakanmuri; ワ冠)	30		冗冠	
15	冫	2	ice, 2-stroke water (にすい, nisui; 二水)	115		冬冶冷凍	
16	几	2	desk (つくえ, tsukue; 机)	38		凡	
17	凵	2	container, inbox (うけばこ, ukebako; 受け箱)	23		凶出函	
18	刀 (刂,⺈)	2	sword (かたな, katana; 刀)	377	37	刀分切初利刻則前	Top 75%
19	力	2	power, force (ちから, chikara; 力)	163		力加助勉	Top 75%
20	勹	2	embrace, wrap frame (つつみがまえ, tsutsumigamae; 包構)	64		勾包	
21	匕	2	spoon hi (さじのひ, sajinohi; 匕のヒ)	19		化北	
22	匚	2	box frame (はこがまえ, hakogamae; 匚構)	64		匣	
23	亡 (匸)	3 (2)	dead, hiding frame (かくしがまえ, kakushigamae; 隠構)	17		亡 妄 忙 忘 盲 荒 望 慌 網	
24	十	2	ten, complete (じゅう, jū; 十)	55	35	十千午半博	Top 75%
25	卜 (⼘,⺊)	2	divination to (ぼくのと, bokunoto; 卜のト)	45		占卦	
26	卩 (㔾)	2	seal (ふしづくり, fushidzukuri; 節旁)	40		印危卵	
27	厂	2	cliff (がんだれ, gandare; 雁垂)	129		厚原	
28	厶	2	private (む, mu)	40		去參	
29	又	2	again, right hand (また, mata)	91		友反取受	
30	口	3	mouth, opening (くち, kuchi)	1,146	100	口古可名君否呉告周味命和哲唐善器	Top 25%
31	囗	3	enclosure (くにがまえ, kunigamae; 国構)	118		四回図国	Top 75%
32	土	3	earth (つち, tsuchi)	580	42	土在地型城場壁壓	Top 50%
33	士	3	scholar, bachelor (さむらい, samurai; 侍)	24		士壹	
34	夂	3	winter (ふゆがしら, fuyugashira; 冬頭)	34		夏 夆	
35	夊	3	winter variant (すいにょう, suinyou; 夊繞)	N/A			
36	夕	3	evening, sunset (ゆうべ, yūbe)	34		夕外多夜	
37	大	3	big, very (だい, dai)	132		大天奈奧	Top 75%
38	女	3	woman, female (おんな, onna)	681	31	女好妄妻姉始姓姫	Top 50%
39	子	3	child, seed (こ, ko)	83		子孔字學	
40	宀	3	roof (うかんむり, ukanmuri; ウ冠)	246	37	守家寒實	Top 50%
41	寸	3	sun (unit of measurement) (すん, sun)	40		寸寺尊將	Top 75%
42	小 (⺌, ⺍)	3	small, insignificant (ちいさい, chīsai; 小さい)	41		小少	
43	尢 (尤,尣)	3	lame (まげあし, mageashi)	66		就	
44	尸	3	corpse (しかばね, shikabane; 屍)	148		尺局	Top 75%
45	屮	3	sprout (てつ, tetsu)	38		屯	
46	山	3	mountain (やま, yama)	636		山岡岩島	Top 75%
47	巛 (川,巜)	3	river (かわ, kawa)	26		川州巡	
48	工	3	work (たくみ, takumi)	17		工左巫差	
49	已 (己,巳)	3	oneself (おのれ, onore)	20		己巳	
50	巾	3	cloth, turban, scarf (はば, haba)	295		市布帝常	Top 75%
51	干	3	dry (ほし, hoshi)	9		平年	
52	幺	3	short thread (いとがしら, itogashira; 糸頭)	50		幻幼	
53	广	3	dotted cliff (まだれ, madare; 麻垂)	15		序店府度座庭廣廳	
54	廴	3	long stride (いんにょう, innyō; 延繞)	9		延	
55	廾	3	two hands, twenty (にじゅうあし, nijūashi; 二十脚)	50		弁	
56	弋	3	ceremony, shoot, arrow (しきがまえ, shikigamae; 式構)	15		式弑	
57	弓	3	bow (ゆみ, yumi)	165		弓引弟弱彌	Top 75%
58	彐 (彑)	3	pig's head (けいがしら, keigashira; 彑頭)	25		彖	
59	彡	3	hair, bristle, stubble, beard (さんづくり, sandzukuri; 三旁)	62		形彦	
60	彳	3	step (ぎょうにんべん, gyouninben; 行人偏)	215		役彼後得徳徼	Top 75%
61	心 (忄,⺗)	4	heart (りっしんべん, risshinben; 立心偏)	1,115	67	必忙忌性悪情想	Top 25%
62	戈	4	spear, halberd (かのほこ, kanohoko)	116		成式弐戦	
63	戸 (戶,户)	4	door, house (とびらのと, tobiranoto)	44		戸戻所	
64	手 (扌,龵)	4	hand (て, te)	1,203	68	手 才 挙 拜 拳 掌 掣 擧 (持 掛 打 批 技 抱 押)	Top 25%
65	支	4	branch (しにょう, shinyō; 支繞)	26		攱攲	
66	攵 (攴)	4	strike, whip (のぶん, nobun; ノ文)	296		收敍數斅	Top 75%
67	文	4	script, literature (ぶん, bun)	26		文 斊 斈 斌 斐 斑 斕	
68	斗	4	dipper, measuring scoop (とます, tomasu)	32		料 斡	
69	斤	4	axe (おの, ono; 斧)	55		斦 斧 新 斥 斬 斷	
70	方	4	way, square, raft (ほう, hō)	92		方 放 旅 族	
71	无 (旡)	4	have not (むにょう, munyō)	12		无 旡 既 旣	
72	日	4	sun, day (にち, nichi)	453	51	日白百明的映時晩	Top 50%
73	曰	4	say (いわく, iwaku)	37		書 最 晉 曷 曹 曾	
74	月 (⺝)	4	moon, month; body, flesh (つき, tsuki)	69	47	有 服 青 朝	Top 50% (肉)
75	木	4	tree (き, ki)	1,369	86	木 杢 板 相 根 森 楽 機 末 本 杉 林	Top 25%
76	欠	4	yawn, lack (あくび, akubi)	235		欣 欽 欧 欲 歌	
77	止	4	stop (とめる, tomeru)	99		正 歩 此 步 武 歪 歲	
78	歹 (歺)	4	death, decay (がつへん, gatsuhen; 歹偏)	231		死 列 殕	
79	殳	4	weapon, lance (ほこつくり, hokotsukuri)	93		役 投 殴 殷	
80	毋 (母,⺟)	4	do not; mother (なかれ-nakare; はは, haha)	16		毋 母 毎 姆 梅	
81	比	4	compare, compete (くらべる, kuraberu)	21		皆 批 毕 毖 毘 毚	
82	毛	4	fur, hair (け, ke)	211		毟 毡 毦 毫 毳 耗	
83	氏	4	clan (うじ, uji)	10		氏 民 紙 婚 氓	
84	气	4	steam, breath (きがまえ, kigamae; 気構)	17		気 汽 氧	
85	水 (氵,氺)	4	water (みず, mizu)	1,595	98	水 永 泳 決 治 海 演 漢 瀬	Top 25%
86	火 (灬)	4	fire (ひ, hi)	639		火 灯 毯 爆 (烈 烹 焦 然 煮)	Top 75%
87	爪 (爫,⺥,⺤)	4	claw, nail, talon (つめ, tsume)	36		爬 爯 爭 爰 爲	
88	父	4	father (ちち, chichi)	10		斧 釜	
89	爻	4	mix, twine, cross (こう, kō)	16		爼 爽 爾	
90	爿 (丬)	4	split wood (しょうへん, shōhen; 爿偏)	48		牀 奘 牃	
91	片	4	(a) slice (かた, kata)	77		版 牌 牒	
92	牙	4	fang (きばへん, kibahen; 牙偏)	9		芽 呀 牚	
93	牛 (牜, ⺧)	4	cow (うし, ushi)	233		告 牟 牧 物 特 解	
94	犬 (犭)	4	dog (いぬ, inu)	444		犬 犯 狂 狙 狗 献 獣	Top 75%
95	玄	5	dark, profound (げん, gen)	6		弦玆	
96	王 (玉, 玊, ⺩)	4	king; ball, jade (おう-ō; たま, tama)	473		王 玉 主 弄 皇 理 差 聖	Top 75%
97	瓜	5	melon (うり, uri)	55		呱 瓞	
98	瓦	5	tile (かわら, kawara)	174		瓧 瓮 甄	
99	甘	5	sweet (あまい, amai)	22		柑 甜 酣	
100	生	5	life (うまれる, umareru)	22		牲 笙 甥	
101	用 (甩)	5	use; (throw) (もちいる, mochīru)	10		佣 甬 甯	
102	田	5	field (た, ta)	192		田 町 思 留 略 番	Top 75%
103	疋 (⺪)	5	bolt of cloth (ひき, hiki)	15		疏 楚 胥 延	
104	疒	5	sickness (やまいだれ, yamaidare; 病垂)	526		病 症 痛 癌 癖	Top 75%
105	癶	5	footsteps (はつがしら, hatsugashira; 発頭)	15		発 登	
106	白	5	white (しろ, shiro)	109		皃 的 皆 皇	
107	皮	5	skin (けがわ, kegawa; 毛皮)	94		披 彼 波	
108	皿	5	dish (さら, sara)	129		盂 盉 盍 監 蘯	
109	目	5	eye (め, me)	647		目 見 具 省 眠 眼 観 覧	
110	矛	5	spear, pike (むのほこ, munohoko)	65		茅 矜	
111	矢	5	arrow (や, ya)	64		医 族 矩	
112	石	5	stone (いし, ishi)	499		石 岩 砂 破 碑 碧	Top 75%
113	示 (礻)	5	altar, display (しめす, shimesu)	213		示 奈 祭 禁 礼 社 神 視 福	Top 75%
114	禸	5	track (ぐうのあし, gūnoashi)	12		禹 禺 禽	
115	禾	5	two-branch tree (のぎ, nogi; ノ木)	431		利 私 季 和 科 香 秦 穀	
116	穴	5	cave (あな, ana)	298		空 突 窅 窘 窩 窶 竇	
117	立	5	stand, erect (たつ, tatsu)	101		立 音 産 翌 意 新 端 親 競	
118	竹 (⺮)	6	bamboo (たけ, take)	953		竺 笑 第 等 簡	Top 75%
119	米	6	rice (こめ, kome)	318		料 断 奥 糊 麟	
120	糸 (糹)	6	thread, string (いと, ito)	823	49	系 級 紙 素 細 組 終 絵 紫	Top 50%
121	缶	6	can, earthenware jar (かん, kan)	77		缶 缸 窑 陶	
122	罒 (网,罓,⺲,⺳)	5	net (あみがしら, amigashira; 網頭)	163		買 置 羅	
123	羊 (⺶,⺷)	6	sheep (ひつじ, hitsuji)	156		着 羚 翔 着	
124	羽	6	feather, wing (はね, hane)	220		習 翀 翁 翔	
125	耂 (老,⺹)	4	old (ろう, rō)	22		耆孝耋	
126	而	6	rake, beard (しかして, shikashite)	22		耎耐耑	
127	耒	6	plow (らいすき, raisuki)	84		耔 耝 耨 耰	
128	耳	6	ear (みみ, mimi)	172		取 聞 職 叢	
129	聿 (⺻)	6	brush (ふでづくり, fudezukuri; 聿旁)	19		律 書 建	
130	肉 (⺼,月)	6	meat (にく, niku)	674		肉 肖 股 胃 腅 脤	Top 50% (月)
131	臣	7	minister, official (しん, shin)	16		臥 宦 蔵	
132	自	6	oneself (みずから, mizukara)	34		自 臫 臬 臲	
133	至	6	arrive (いたる, itaru)	24		致 臸 臺	
134	臼	6	mortar (うす, usu)	71		桕 舅 舂 鼠 插	
135	舌	6	tongue (した, shita)	31		乱 适 話 舍	
136	舛	7	opposite (ます, masu)	10		舛 舜 舞	
137	舟	6	boat (ふね, fune)	197		航 船 艦	
138	艮	6	stopping (うしとら, ushitora; 丑寅)	5		良 飲 很	
139	色	6	colour, prettiness (いろ, iro)	21		色 艴 艷	
140	艹 (艸,䒑)	3	grass, vegetation (くさ, kusa; 草)	1,902		共 花(37) 英 苦 草 茶 落 幕 靴 鞄 薬	Top 50%
141	虍	6	tiger stripes (とらかんむり, torakanmuri; 虎冠)	114		虎 虐 彪 虒	
142	虫	6	insect (むし, mushi)	1,067		蚯 蚓 強 触 蟻 蟹	
143	血	6	blood (ち, chi)	60		洫 衁 衅 衆	
144	行	6	go, do (ぎょう, gyō)	53		行 衍 術 衝	
145	衣 (衤)	6	clothes (ころも, koromo)	607		衣 装 裁 (初 被 複)	
146	西 (襾,覀)	6	west (にし, nishi)	29		西 要 覊	
147	見	7	see (みる, miru)	161		規 親 覺 觀	
148	角	7	horn (つの, tsuno)	158		觚 解 觕 觥 觸	
149	言 (訁)	7	speech (こと, koto)	861	54	誁 詋 詔 評 詗 詥 試 詧	Top 50%
150	谷	7	valley (たに, tani)	54		谿 豀 谸	
151	豆	7	bean (まめ, mame)	68		豈 豐 豎	
152	豕	7	pig (いのこ, inoko; 猪子)	148		豕 豚 象	
153	豸	7	cat, badger (むじな, mujina; 狢)	140		豹 貌 貓 貉	
154	貝	7	shell (かい, kai)	277	32	財 賊 賜 贛 貧 貨 貫 貿	Top 50%
155	赤	7	red, bare (あか, aka)	31		赫 赭	
156	走 (赱)	7	run (はしる, hashiru)	285		赴 起 超	
157	足 (⻊)	7	foot (あし, ashi)	580		跑 跨 跟 跪 路	
158	身	7	body (み, mi)	97		躬 躲 軀	
159	車	7	cart, car (くるま, kuruma)	361		軌 軟 較 軍 載	
160	辛	7	spicy, bitter (からい, karai)	36		辜 辟 辣 辦 辨	
161	辰	7	morning (しんのたつ, shinnotatsu; 辰のたつ)	15		辱 農	
162	⻌ (辵,辶)	3	walk (しんにゅう／しんにょう, shinnyū; shinnyō) 之繞	381	38	巡 迎 通 追 逃 迎 進	Top 50%
163	邑 (⻏, 阝)	3	town (阝 right) (むら, mura)	350	30	那 邦 郎 部 郭 都 鄉	Top 50% (阝)
164	酉	7	sake (rice-based alcoholic beverage) (とり, tori)	290		酒 醉 油 醒 酸	Top 75%
165	釆	7	divide, distinguish, choose (のごめ, nogome; ノ米)	14		釉 釋	
166	里	7	village, mile (さと, sato)	14		野 野	
167	金 (釒)	8	metal, gold (かね, kane)	806		銀 銅 釘 銳 鋞 鋙 鉒 鉍 鉗 鈡 鈠	Top 50%
168	長 (镸)	8	long, grow; leader (ながい-nagai; ちょう, chō)	55		長	
169	門	8	gate (もん, mon)	246		間 閑 関 闘 閉 開 閏 間	
170	阜 (⻖, 阝)	3	mound, dam (阝 left) (ぎふのふ, gifunofu; 岐阜の阜)	348	30	阪 防 阻 陆 陘 院 险 陳	Top 50% (阝)
171	隶	8	slave, capture (れいづくり, reidzukuri; 隷旁)	12		隸 隺	
172	隹	8	old bird (ふるとり, furutori; 古鳥)	233		雀 集 雁 难 雀 雅	
173	雨 (⻗)	8	rain (あめ, ame)	298		雾 霜 雪 霸 雲 霧	Top 75%
174	青 (靑)	8	green, blue (あお, ao)	17		靕 靖 靜	
175	非	8	wrong (あらず, arazu)	25		靠 靠 靟	
176	面 (靣)	9	face (めん, men)	66		靦 靨	
177	革	9	leather, rawhide (かくのかわ, kakunokawa)	305		靴 鞍 鞅 鞍 鞭	
178	韋	9	tanned leather (なめしがわ, nameshigawa)	100		韋 韓 韜	
179	韭	9	leek (にら, nira)	20		韱 韲	
180	音	9	sound (おと, oto)	43		韶 韻 韾	
181	頁	9	big shell (おおがい, ōgai; 大貝)	372		頃 項 順 須 領 頭 頩 頂	
182	風 (𠘨)	9	wind (かぜ, kaze)	182		風 颱 飄 颿 颪	
183	飛	9	fly (とぶ, tobu)	92		飜 飝	
184	食 (飠, 𩙿)	9	eat, food (しょく, shoku)	403		飯 飲 餓 餘 餐 養	
185	首	9	neck, head (くび, kubi)	20		馗 馘	
186	香	9	fragrant (においこう, nioikō)	37		馨	
187	馬	10	horse (うま, uma)	472		馮 馴 馳 駐 驚	
188	骨	10	bone (ほね, hone)	185		骼 髒 髀 骿 骾	
189	高 (髙)	10	tall, high (たかい, takai)	34		髚 髛	
190	髟	10	hair (かみがしら, kamigashira; 髪頭)	243		髮 鬚 鬆 鬍 髦	
191	鬥	10	fight (とうがまえ, tōgamae; 闘構)	23		鬧 鬪	
192	鬯	10	herbs, sacrificial wine (ちょう, chō)	8		鬰 鬱	
193	鬲	10	tripod, cauldron (かなえ, kanae)	73		鬶 鬷 鬸	
194	鬼	10	ghost, demon (おに, oni)	141		魂 魁 鬽 魄	
195	魚	11	fish (うお, uo)	571		鯉 鮑 魛 魜 魝 魞 魟 魠	
196	鳥	11	bird (とり, tori)	750		鳫 鳮 鳱 鳳 鳴 鳿 雞 鳴 鴻 鴛	
197	鹵	11	salt (ろ, ro)	44		鹹 鹼 鹽	
198	鹿	11	deer (しか, shika)	104		塵 麃 麋 麉 麟	
199	麦 (麥)	7	wheat (むぎ, mugi; 麦)	131		麴 麵 麱 麨 麺	
200	麻	11	hemp, flax (あさ, asa)	34		麼 魔	
201	黄 (黃)	11	yellow (きいろ, kīro; 黄色)	42		黊 黌	
202	黍	12	millet (きび, kibi)	46		黏 黎	
203	黒 (黑)	11	black (くろ, kuro)	172		點 黛 黱 黨	
204	黹	12	embroidery, needlework (ふつ, futsu; 黻)	8		黼 黻	
205	黽	13	frog, amphibian (べん, ben)	40		黿 鼈	
206	鼎	13	sacrificial tripod (かなえ, kanae)	14		鼏 鼒	
207	鼓	13	drum (つづみ, tsudzumi)	46		鼗 鼘	
208	鼠	13	rat, mouse (ねずみ, nezumi)	92		鼢 鼣 鼤	
209	鼻	14	nose (はな, hana)	49		鼼 鼽 鼿	
210	齊	14	even, uniformly (せい, sei; 斉)	18		齋 齏 齏	
211	歯 (齒)	12	tooth, molar (は, ha)	162		齡 齠 齗	
212	竜 (龍)	10	dragon (りゅう, ryū)	14		龖 龘	
213	亀 (龜)	11	turtle, tortoise (かめ, kame)	24		龝	
214	龠	17	flute (やく, yaku)	19		龣	

=== Kanji radicals not recognized by Kangxi ===
These radicals are either listed as variants or not listed at all in the kangxi radical table.

The 214 Kangxi radicals are technically classifiers as they are not always etymologically correct, but since linguists use that word in the sense of "classifying" nouns (such as in counter words) dictionaries commonly call the kanji components radicals. As dictionaries have moved from textbooks to interactive screens the term "radicals" seems to now be used for any kanji component used in a visual search.

New radical	Stroke count	Kanji note
亻	2	Variant of 人
𠆢	2	Some dictionaries use 个.
䒑	2	Variant of 艸/艹
マ	2	Katakana ま (ma).
九	2	Japanese nine, pronounced きゅう (kyū).
ユ	2	Katakana ゆ (yu).
乃	2	From 丿.
刂	2	Variant of 刀
⺌	3	Variant of 小.
川	3	Variant of 巛.
彑	3	Variant of 彐.
也	3	From 乙.
亡	3	From 亠.
及	3	及 = 丿 + ㇋ + ㇃.
久	3	From 丿.
忄	3	Variant of 心.
扌	3	Variant of 手.
氵	3	Variant of 水.
犭	3	Variant of 犬.
灬	4	Variant of 火.
元	4	From 儿.
井	4	井 = 二 + ノ + ｜
勿	4	From 勹.
尤	4	Variant of 尢.
五	4	Japanese five.
屯	4	From 屮/艸/艹
巴	4	From 已/己
礻	4	Variant of 示
衤	5	Variant of 衣.
世	5	Modern form of 丗, from 山 + 一.
巨	5	From 匚 + 工.
冊	5	Modern form of 册, from 冂. (⺵)
母	5	Variant of 毋.
奄	8	From 大 + 电.
岡	8	岡 = 冂 + 䒑 + 山
免	8	免 = ⺈ + 口 + ｜ + 儿
斉	8	Variant of 齊.
品	9	Variant of 口.
啇	11	啇 = 立 + 冂 + 古 (十 + 口)
無	12	Variant of 无.

=== Other possible radical candidates ===
New radical	Stroke count	Kanji note
⺈	2	Variant of 刀 or 勹
覀	6	Variant of 西
⺮	6	Variant of 竹

- 竹 and 西 (西 to a lesser extent) are only used in their original form when representing the original meanings. As components of jōyō kanji they always appear as ⺮ and 覀.

== Position of radical within character ==
There are fourteen different radical positions, seven basic types and seven variant. The following table lists radical types with Japanese name and position in red and indicate how Kanji is formed by radical with example.

Position	Japanese name	Chinese	Meaning	Example
	hen (偏)	旁	Left sided element	略 consists of Radical 102 田 and 各.
	tsukuri (旁)	旁	Right accompanying element	期 consists of Radical 74 月 and 其.
	kanmuri (冠)	頭	Crown element	歩 consists of Radical 77 止 and 少, and 男 consists of Radical 102 田 and 力. Note that single radical (e.g., Radical 102 田) is used for other type as well, and lesser strokes simple Kanji works as a radical, like 力 is also Radical 19.
	ashi (脚)	底	Foot element	志 consists of Radical 61 心 and 士, and 畠 consists of Radical 102 田 and 白. Also note that single radical is interchangeably used for other type as well, and 白 is Radical 106 too, but not used as crown type for 畠.
	ashi variant		Top and bottom element	亘 consists of Radical 7 二 and 日.
	ashi variant		Center element	昼 consists of Radical 72 日 with upper 尺 and lower 一.
	tare (垂)		Dangle / left shoulder element	房 consists of Radical 63 戸 and 方.
	nyō (繞)		Surround / left and bottom element	起 consists of Radical 156 走 and 己.
	kamae (構)		Posture (box, enclosure) element	国 consists of Radical 31 囗 and 玉.
	kamae variant		Box, bottom open	間 consists of Radical 169 門 and 日.
	kamae variant		Box, top open	凶 consists of Radical 17 凵 and 乄.
	kamae variant		Box, right open	医 consists of Radical 22 匚 and 矢.
	kamae variant		Right shoulder	式 consists of Radical 56 弋 and 工.
	kamae variant		Left and right sided	街 consists of Radical 144 行 and 圭.

== See also ==
- List of kanji radicals by frequency
- List of Unicode radicals
- Kangxi radical
