= List of kanji radicals by frequency =

This is a simplified table of Japanese kanji visual components (graphemes) that does away with all the archaic forms found in the Japanese version of the Kangxi radicals.

The 214 Kanji radicals are technically classifiers as they are not always etymologically correct, but since linguistics uses that word in the sense of "classifying" nouns (such as in counter words), dictionaries commonly call the kanji components radicals. As dictionaries have moved from textbooks to interactive screens, the term "radicals" seems to now be used for any kanji component used in a visual search.

== Most common radicals ==
There are two readings for a kanji: On'yomi and Kun'yomi. On'yomi is a reading derived from the Chinese way of reading, Kun'yomi is the original Japanese reading.

The six radicals that occur the most frequently (in order of frequency) and occur in one quarter of the 2136 Jōyō kanji:

Character	Stroke count	Translation	Kun	On
口 (くち)	3	mouth, opening (not to be confused with box radical 囗)	くち	コウ、 ク
水/氵 (みず)	4/3	water	みず、 みず-	スイ
木 (き)	4	tree	き、 こ-	ボク、 モク
人/亻 (ひと)	2	person, human	ひと、 -り、 -と	ジン、 ニン
手/扌 (て)	4	hand	て、 て-、 -て、 た-	シュ、 ズ
心/忄/⺗ (こころ)	4	heart radical, spirit, mind	こころ、 -ごころ	シン

Fourteen radicals that together with the above occur in half of Jōyō kanji:

Character	Stroke count	Translation	Kun	On
言 (こと)	7	word, say, speech / to speak	い.う、 こと	ゲン、 ゴン
日 (ひ, ニチ)	4	sun, day, Sunday, time, counter for days	ひ、 -び、 -か	ニチ、 ジツ
糸 (いと)	6	silk/thread	いと	シ
幺 (いとがしら)	3	short thread radical (a variant of ⽷)	ちいさい	ヨウ
肉 (にく)	6	meat/organ, flesh	しし	ニク
月 (つき)	4	moon, month, Monday, period, counter for months	つき	ゲツ、 ガツ
土 (つち)	3	ground, soil, earth, Turkey	つち	ド、 ト
⻌ (しんにょう)	3	go/road radical, walk, to advance (a variant of ⾡)		
艹 (艸/草/くさ)	3	grass/plant radical		
宀 (屋根/やね, ウ/ウ冠/うかんむり)	3	roof/crown radical, roof (house), shaped crown		ベン、 メン
貝 (かい)	7	shell, property, wealth	かい	バイ
女 (おんな, ジョ)	3	woman / female	おんな、 め	ジョ、 ニョ、 ニョウ
阝 (⻖/阜/こざと) (⻏/邑/おおざと)	3	wall/hill/village radical (left side); large village radical (right side) place, left village radical, country, city	こざと	
金 (かね/キン)	8	gold/metal, mineral	かね、 かな-、 -がね	キン、 コン、 ゴン

Thirty-two radicals that together with the above occur in three quarters of Jōyō kanji:

Character	Stroke count	Translation	Kun	On	Variants
一 (イチ/いち)	1	one	ひと-、 ひと.つ	イチ、 イツ	
刀/刂 (かたな, トウ)	2	knife, sword	かたな、 そり	トウ	刂 (つくり) right side of the kanji
十 (ジュウ, と)	2	ten, complete	とお、 と、 そ	ジュウ、 ジッ、 ジュッ	
田 (た, デン)	5	rice field / rice paddy	た	デン	田 (へん) left side of the kanji
火/灬 (ひ, カ)	4	fire	ひ、 -び、 ほ-	カ	火 (へん), 灬 (あし) left side of the kanji, bottom of the kanji
大 (おお, ダイ)	3	big, very	おお-、 おお.きい、 -おお.いに	ダイ、 タイ	
山 (やま, サン)	3	mountain	やま	サン、 セン	山 (へん), かんむり left side of the kanji, top of kanji
食 / 飠 (しょく)	9	eat, food, to eat	く.う、 く.らう、 た.べる、 は.む	ショク、 ジキ	食=飠 (へん) left side of the kanji
車 (くるま)	7	vehicle, cart, car, wheel	くるま	シャ	車 (へん) left side of the kanji
彳 (行人/ぎょうにん)	3	walking/going person radical, stop, linger, loiter, step, stride, street, to go	たたず.む	テキ	彳 (へん), ⾏ (かまえ) left side of the kanji, enclose the kanji
目 (め)	5	eye radical, class, look, insight, experience, care, favor	め、 -め、 ま-	モク、 ボク	目 (へん), 目 (かんむり), left side of the kanji, top of kanji
雨 (あめ)	8	rain	あめ、 あま-、 -さめ	ウ	雨 (かんむり) top of kanji
犬 / 犭 (いぬ, ケン)	4/3	dog	いぬ、 いぬ-	ケン	犭 (へん) left side of the kanji
王 (おう)	4	king radical, rule, magnate		オウ、 -ノウ	
玉 (たま)	5	ball, jewel / jewelry	たま、 たま-、 -だま	ギョク	
石 (いし)	5	stone	いし	セキ、 シャク、 コク	石 (へん) left side of the kanji
力 (ちから)	2	power radical, strength, strong, strain, bear up, exert	ちから	リョク、 リキ、 リイ	
衣/衤 (ころも)	6/5	garment, clothing / clothes, dressing	ころも、 きぬ、 -ぎ	イ、 エ	衣=衤(へん) left side of the kanji
弓 (ゆみ)	3	bow (in archery, violin)	ゆみ	キュウ	弓(へん) left side of the kanji
竹/⺮ (たけ)	6	bamboo	たけ	チク	⺮ (かんむり) on the top of kanji
又 (また)	2	again, right hand, on the other hand	また、 また-、 また.の-	ユウ	
⽁ / 攵 (のぶん)	4	action radical, folding chair radical, strike, activity, to strike, hit		ホク	⽁ (つくり), 攵 (つくり) on the right side of the kanji
夂 (ふゆがしら)	3	winter radical, to follow, late, delayed	しゅう	チ	
示/礻 (しめす)	5/4	show on an altar radical, altar, festival, religious service, indicate, point out, express, display	しめ.す	ジ、 シ	示=礻 (へん) the left side of the kanji
酉 (とり)	7	bird radical, wine / alcohol, sake jar, bird, west, sign of the bird, 5-7PM, tenth sign of Chinese zodiac	とり	ユウ	酉 (へん) left side of the kanji
囗 (くに)	3	box, or enclosure radical (not to be confused with mouth radical 口)	イ、 コク	囗 = (かまえ) enclose the kanji	
禾 (いね)	5	grain radical, two-branch tree radical	いね	カ	禾 = (へん) left side of the kanji
广 (間/ま)	3	building / house on a cliff radical, slanting roof		ゲン	广 = (たれ) Radicals which "hang down"
疒 (病/やまい)	5	sickness radical / trailing sickness radical	や.む	ダク、 ニャク、 ソウ、 ジョウ、 シツ	疒 = (たれ) Radicals which "hang down"
巾 (きん/はば)	3	cloth radical, towel, hanging scroll, width,	おお.い、 ちきり、 きれ	キン、 フク	巾 (へん) left side of the kanji
尸 (かたしろ, シ)	3	flag, corpse radical, remains	かたしろ	シ	尸 = (たれ) Radicals which "hang down"
寸 (すん)	3	inch (2.25 cm)/sundial, measurement, tenth of a shaku, a little, small degree radical		スン	寸 (つくり) on the right side of the kanji

== Table of kanji radicals ==
=== Table key ===
Position category:

- へん (hen) - left ◧ - radical forms the left component of a kanji.
- つくり (tsukuri) - right ◨ - radical forms the right component of a kanji.
- かんむり (kanmuri) - top ⊤ - radical forms the top component of a kanji.
- あし (ashi) - bottom ⊥ - radical forms the bottom component of a kanji.
- かまえ (kamae) - wrap ⿴ - radical encloses the other kanji components.
- たれ (tare) - top-left ⿸ - radical forms the left and top components of a kanji.
- にょう (nyou) - bottom-left ⿺ - radical forms the left and bottom component of a kanji.
- Either left or right ◫ - radical can form either the left or right component of a kanji.

=== Notes ===
- This is a simplified list, so the reading of the radical is only given if the kanji is used on its own.
- Example kanji for each radical are all jōyō kanji, but some examples show all jōyō (ordered by stroke number) while others were from the Chinese radicals page with non-jōyō (and Chinese-only) characters removed.
- No radicals with more than 12 strokes are listed as they are not as common and can all be formed from the other components.
- The radicals are listed in the same basic order that the Kanji radicals are listed except for the two and three-stroke radicals which are in a more visual order.

=== Table ===
Radical	Stroke count	Hiragana-Romaji	Meaning	Position	Examples
一	1	いち-ichi	one		一 戸 旦
丨	1		line		巾 引 中 甲 旧
丶	1	てん-ten	dot		刃 凡 丸 丹 太 犬 丼
丿	1		bend		丈 久 才 万 丹 少
乙 (乚)	1	おつ-otsu	second, latter		乙 乞 乏 孔 屯 札 礼 宅 乱 枕 乳
亅	1		hook		了 丁 才
二	2	に-ni	two		井 仁 元 示
亠	2		lid	⊤	六 玄 市 夜 京
人	2	ひと-hito	human, person		人 欠 夫 内 囚 丙 失 肉 扶 快 決
亻	2		human, person	◧	仏 化 付 代 他 仕 休 位 作 体 住 何 花 信
𠆢	2		person (人); (入; roof)	⊤	介 今 合 全 会 谷
儿	2		human legs	⊥	児 兄 四 見
入	2	いる-iru	enter		入 込
八	2	はち-hachi	eight; divide	⊤	八 分 公 谷 沿 松 俗 盆 翁 紛容 益 粉 浴 挙 訟 欲 船 雰 裕 鉛 溶 寡 総 嬢
ハ	2		animal legs	⊥	六 穴 呉 兵 貝 洪 唄 冥 浜 財 員 棋 貿 貸 買 賛 質 興
丷	2		grass, plant; horns	⊤	平 半 羊 岡 前 首 南
冫	2		ice	◧	次 冶 冷
凵	2		container, open mouth	⊥	画
匚	2		box	⿴	匯
冂	2		upside down box	⿴	円 冊 再 同
冖	2		cover	⊤	売 学 骨 常
几	2	つくえ-tsukue	desk, table	◨	肌 机
九	2	きゅう-kyū	nine		枠
力	2	ちから-chikara	power, force		男
刀	2	かたな-katana	knife, sword		切
刂	2		knife, sword	◨	割 利 前
乃	2	の-no		⊥	秀 透 携 誘 /及
勹	2		wrap, embrace	⿴	与 勾 匂 欠 巧 句 包 号 写 旬 朽 汚 考 均 泡 抱 拘 易 的 物
⺈	2		knife, sword	⊤	危 争 色 角 免 浄 急 負 陥 逸 亀 喚 換 象 像 静 衡 艶
マ	2	ま-ma.	Katakana マ	⊤	勇 通 湧 痛 踊 疑 凝 擬 /予 矛
匕	2	さじ-saji	spoon; (七 = seven)		七 匂 化 切 叱 北 旨 死 花 虎 背
十	2	じゅう-jū	ten, complete		協 博
卜	2	うらない-uranai	divination	◨	占 下 上
又	2	また-mata	again, right hand		友 受
厶	2	む-mu	private		私 公
卩 (㔾)	2		seal	◨	厄 犯 令 危 印 服 卵 命 報
厂	2		cliff	⿸	原
广	3		on a cliff	⿸	序 店 府
口	3	くち-kuchi	mouth, opening		口 古 可 名 君 否 呉 告 周 味 命 和 哲 唐 善 器
囗	3		enclosure	⿴	四 回
土	3	つち-tsuchi	earth		土 地
士	3	さむらい-samurai	scholar, bachelor		士 声 誌 志 売 読
夂	3		go	⊥	夏
夕	3	ゆうべ-yūbe	evening, sunset		夕 外 多 夜
尢	3				沈 枕 就 蹴 /尤 无
大	3	だい-dai	big, very		大 天
女	3	おんな-onna	woman, female		女 妻 嫁 凄 好
子	3	こ-ko	child, seed		子 好
宀	3		roof		家
寸	3	すん-sun	thumb, sundial degree		時 侍 待 寺
小	3	ちいさい-chīsai	small, insignificant		小 少
⺌ (⺍)	3		small, insignificant		当 光 鎖 巣 桜 獣 単 脳 悩 厳
幺	3		short thread		幻 幼
尸	3		corpse		尺 局
山	3	やま-yama	mountain		山 岡 岩 島
川	3	かわ-kawa	river		川 州 巡 流 荒
工	3	たくみ-takumi	work		工 左 差
已	3	おのれ-onore	oneself		(己 巳)
亡	3	な・くす-nakusu	dead, gone		亡 妄 忙 忘 盲 荒 望 慌 網
巾	3	はば-haba	turban, scarf		市 布 帝 常
干	3	ほし-hoshi	dry		平 年
廾	3		two hands, twenty		弁
廴	3		long stride	⿺	延
⻌ (辶)	3		walk	⿺	巡 迎 通 追 逃 迎 進
也	3			◨	地 池 他 施
弋	3		ceremony, shoot, arrow		式
弓	3	ゆみ-yumi	bow		弓 引
彐	3		pig snout		
彡	3		hair, bristle, stubble, beard		杉 形 参 珍 修 彫 惨 彩 診 須 髪 彰 影 膨 顔 鬱
彳	3		step	◧	役 彼 後 得 徳
氵	3		water	◧	泳 決 治 海 演 漢 瀬
丬 (爿)	3		split wood	◧	北 壮 状 荘 背 将 装 寝 奨
犭	3		dog	◧	犯 狂 狙
扌	3		hand	◧	持 掛 打 批 技 抱 押
艹	3		grass, vegetation	⊤	共 花 英 苦 草 茶 落 幕 靴 薬
⻖←	3		mound (阝-left)	◧	阪 防 阻 院 陳
→⻏	3		town (阝-right)	◨	那 邦 郎 部 郭 都
忄	3		heart	◧	忙 快 怪 怖 性 恒 恨 悔 悟 悩 悦 惨 悼 惧 惜 情 愉 惰 慌 慄 慨 慎 憎 慢 慣
心	4	こころ-kokoro	heart	⊥	心 必 芯 忍 忌 忘 志 応 泌 忠 念 怒 怠 怨 急 思 恭 恥 恐 恋 恵 恣 秘 恩 息 恋
戈	4		spear, halberd		成 式 弐 戦
戸	4	と-to	door, house		戸 戻 所
手	4	て-te	hand		手 挙
攵	4	のぶん-nobunn	action, whip		薇
文	4	ぶん-bunn	script, literature		文
斗	4		dipper, measuring scoop		料
斤	4	きん-kinn	axe		新
方	4	ほう-hō	way, square, raft		方 放 旅 族
日	4	にち-nichi	sun, day		日 白 百 明 的 映 時 晩
月	4	つき-tsuki	moon, month; body, flesh		有 服 青 朝
木	4	き-ki	tree		木 板 相 根 森 楽 機 末 本 杉 林
欠	4	けつ-ketsu	yawn, lack		歌 欧
止	4	とめる-tomeru	stop		止 正 歩
歹	4		death, decay		死 列
殳	4	るまた-rumata	weapon, lance		役 投 殴
毋	4		do not		毎 梅
比	4	くらべる-kuraberu	compare, compete		皆 昆
毛	4	け-ke	fur, hair		毛
氏	4	うじ-uji	clan		氏 民 紙
气	4		steam, breath		汽 気
水	4	みず-mizu	water		水 永
火	4	ひ-hi	fire		火 灯
灬	4		fire		焦 然 煮
⺤ (爪)	4	つめ-tsume	claw, nail, talon		爪 妥 采 乳 受 浮 将 渓 淫 彩 授 採 菜 援 揺 媛 奨 暖 愛 稲 緩 謡 穏 曖 爵
父	4	ちち-chichi	father		釜
牛	4	うし-ushi	cow		牛 告 牧 物 特 解
犬	4	いぬ-inu	dog		犬 献 獣
王	4	おう-ō	king		王 玉 主 国 弄 皇 理 差 聖
礻	4		altar, display		礼 社 神 視 福 祖
耂	4		old		孝 教 者
勿	4		do not		
五	4	ご-go	five		五
巴	4		cylinder with a trailing tail		色 把 肥
元	4	もと-moto	base, origin		
井	4	せい-sei	well		
予	4	よ-yo	beforehand, previously		予 序 野 預 /矛
屯	4	トン-ton			屯 純 鈍 頓
甘	5	あまい-amai	sweet		甘 甚 某 勘 紺 基 欺 堪 棋 媒 期 旗 謀
生	5	うまれる-umareru	life		牲 甥 性 徃 姓
用	5	よう-yō	use		用
田	5	た-ta	field		田 町 思 留 略 番
疋	5	ひき-hiki	small animal; bolt of cloth		延
疒	5		sickness	⿸	病 症 痛 癖
癶	5		footsteps		発 登
白	5	しろ-shiro	white		的 皆 皇
皮	5	けがわ-kegawa	skin		披 彼 波
皿	5	さら-sara	dish		皿
目	5	め-me	eye		目 見 具 省 眠 眼 観 覧
矢	5	や-ya	arrow		医 族
石	5	いし-ishi	stone		石 岩 砂 破 碑
示	5	しめす-shimesu	altar, display		示 奈 祭 禁
禾	5	のぎ-nogi	grain		利 私 季 和 科 香
穴	5	あな-ana	cave		空 突
立	5	たつ-tatsu	stand, erect		立 音 産 翌 意 新 端 親 競
母	5	はは-haha	mother		母
衤	5		clothes		初 被 複
罒	5		net		買 罪 置 羅
世	5	よ-yo	society, world; generation		
⺻	5		brush		津 律 建 書 庸 健 筆 鍵
冊	5	さつ-satsu	(counting) books		冊 柵 倫 偏 遍 論 編 輪
而	6		rake		耐 需 端 儒
⺮	6	たけ-take	bamboo		竹 第 筆 竿 算 答 管 筋 等 笑 箸
米	6	こめ-kome	rice		
糸	6	いと-ito	silk		結 紙
缶	6	かん-kann	tin can		缶 陶 鬱
羊	6	ひつじ-hitsuji	sheep		
羽	6	はね-hane	feather, wing		
耳	6	みみ-mimi	ear		聞
自	6	じ-ji	self (nose=self)		
至	6	いたる-itaru	arrive		
舌	6	した-shita	tongue		
舟	6	ふね-fune	boat		
艮 (良)	6	うしとら-ushitora	stopping(?); (good)		狼
虍	6		tiger stripes		虎 虐 虚 虜 虞 戯 膚 慮 劇
虫	6	むし-mushi	insect		蟻 蜂 蝶
血	6	ち-chi	blood		
行	6	ぎょう-gyō	go, do		
衣	6	ころも-koromo	clothes		
覀 (襾)	6	にし-nishi	west		西 価 要 票 煙 腰 慄 漂 遷 標 覆 覇
臣	7	しん-shin	minister, official; slave (building a brick wall)		姫
見	7	みる-miru	see		
角	7	つの-tsuno	horn		
言	7	こと-koto	speech		読 語 記
谷	7	たに-tani	valley		
豆	7	まめ-mame	bean		
豕	7	いのこ-inoko	pig		家
貝	7	かい-kai	shell		
足	7	あし-ashi	foot		
身	7	み-mi	body		
車	7	くるま-kuruma	cart, car		
辛	7	からい-karai	spicy, bitter		
辰	7	たつ-tatsu	dragon; morning		
酉	7	とり-tori	wine, alcohol		
里	7	さと-sato	village, mile		
赤	7	あか-aka	red		赤 赦 跡 嚇 繊
走	7	そう-sō	race		走 赴 徒 起 越 超 趣
金	8	かね-kane	metal, gold		
長	8	ながい-nagai; ちょう-chyō	long, grow; leader		
門	8	もん-mon	gate		問 間 関 聞
隹	8	ふるとり-furutori	small bird		
雨	8	あめ-ame	rain		雪 電 雲
青	8	あお-ao	blue, green		
岡	8	おか-oka	hill		岡 剛 綱 鋼
免	8	めん-menn	dismissal		免 勉 逸 晩
斉	8	せい-sei	Chinese Qi kingdom		斉 剤 斎 済
音	9	おと-oto	sound		意
頁	9	おおがい-ōgai	big shell		
食	9	しょく-shyoku	eat, food		飲
首	9	くび-kubi	neck, head		
品	9	ひん-hin	item		
馬	10	うま-uma	horse		
高	10	たかい-takai	tall, high		
啇	11		base, stem		嫡 滴 摘 適 敵
無	12	む-mu	nothing		無 舞

== Other combinations ==
=== Variations of this table ===
Many other combinations could realistically be called a simplified table of kanji radicals, here are a few examples.

- 䒑 could replace both 丷 and 艹
- ⺈ could be merged with 刀 or 勹 (not commonly used as a radical by itself)
- 聿 or 書 could be used instead of ⺻

Entries with an upside-down exclamation mark (¡) are possibly made up "radicals," meaning only one online dictionary was found to use them (Tangorin Online).

Possible additions: (Note that the examples below show all the jōyō kanji examples)

Radical	Stroke count	Hiragana-Romaji	Meaning	Category	Examples	Reason for exclusion
ユ	2	ゆ-yu	Katakana ユ		(夬 决 刔 抉 篌)	Not used by jōyō kanji
久	3				久 畝	
彑	3				互 彙	
及	3	およ・ぶ-oyobu			及 扱 吸 級	Search using 乃 instead
上	3	うえ-ue	above	¡	上 峠 虚 寂 督	上 = ⿱⺊一
化	4	か-ka	action suffix, -isation, -ification	¡	化 花 貨 傾 靴	化 = ⿰亻匕
分	4	ぶん-bunn	part	¡	盆 紛 粉 貧 雰 貿 頒 寡	分 = ⿱八刀
切	4	せつ-setsu	keen; sharp edge	¡	切 窃	切 = ⿰七刀
出	5	で-de	go out, send out	¡	拙 屈 堀 掘 窟	出 = ⿱山山
付	5	づけ-(d)zuke	date of origin	¡	付 附 侍 府 符 腐	付 = ⿰亻寸
巨	5		giant		巨 拒 距	Search using 匚 instead
竹	6	たけ-take	bamboo		竹	Only used for 竹 (see ⺮)
西	6	にし-nishi	west		西	Mainly used for 西 (see 覀)
耒	6				耗 耕 業 籍	Search using 木 instead
肉	6	にく-niku	meat		肉 腐	Mainly only used for 肉
色	6	いろ-iro	color, prettiness		色 絶 艶	色 = ⿱⺈巴
合	6	ごう-gō	mountain climbing checkpoint	¡	合 拾 搭 塔 給 答	合 = ⿱𠆢一⿱口
奄	8		cover		俺	Mainly only used for 俺
禹	9				偶 遇 隅 愚 属 嘱	Search using 虫 instead

List of radicals that form common jōyō kanji and are a part of the Table of Japanese kanji radicals page but do not appear here. All jōyō kanji examples for each radical are listed.

Radical	Strokes	Hiragana-Romaji	Meaning	Category	Examples
巛	3	かわ-kawa	river		巡 災 拶
屮	3	てつ-tetsu	sprout		(屯) 逆 塑 遡
片	4	かた-kata	(a) slice		片 版
支	4	しにょう-shinyō	branch		支 伎 岐 技 肢 枝 鼓
禸	5	ぐうのあし-gūnoashi	track		偶 遇 隅 属 愚 璃 嘱 離
矛	5	むのほこ-munohoko	spear, halberd		矛 柔 務 野 霧
玄	5	げん-gen	dark, profound		玄 弦 畜 舷 率 蓄
瓦	5	かわら-kawara	tile		瓦 瓶
牙	5	きばへん-kibahen	fang		牙 邪 芽 既 雅 慨 概
竹	6	たけ-take	bamboo		笑 第 等 簡
西	6	にし-nishi	west		西 要
色	6	いろ-iro	colour, prettiness		色 絶 艶
瓜	6	うり-uri	melon		孤 弧
臼	6	うす-usu	mortar		臼 毀 潟 興
豸	7	むじな-mujina	cat, badger		貌 墾 懇
釆	7	のごめ-nogome	divide, distinguish, choose		釈 番 審 翻 藩
麦	7	むぎ-mugi	wheat		麦 麺
舛	7	ます-masu	opposite		傑 舞 隣 瞬
隶	8	れいづくり-reidzukuri	slave, capture		粛 逮 康 緑 隷 録
非	8	あらず-arazu	wrong		非 俳 排 扉 悲 罪 輩
面	9	めん-men	face		面 麺
飛	9	とぶ-tobu	fly		飛
革	9	かくのかわ-kakunokawa	leather, rawhide		革 靴 覇
鬲	10	かなえ-kanae	tripod, cauldron		隔 融
韋	10	なめしがわ-nameshigawa	tanned leather		偉 違 緯 衛 韓
竜	10	りゅう-ryū	dragon		竜 滝
骨	10	ほね-hone	bone		骨 滑 骸 髄
鬼	10	おに-oni	ghost, demon		鬼 塊 魂 魅 醜 魔
麻	11	あさ-asa	hemp, flax		麻 暦 歴 摩 磨 魔
鳥	11	とり-tori	bird		島 鳥 鳴 鶏 鶴
鹿	11	しか-shika	deer		鹿 麗 麓
黒	11	くろ-kuro	black		黒 墨 黙
魚	11	うお-uo	fish		魚 漁 鮮 鯨
黄	11	きいろ-kīro	yellow		黄 横
歯	12	は-ha	tooth, molar		歯 齢

=== Radicals ordered by frequency ===
With frequency considered to be the amount of kanji where the radical or its variants can be found as a visual component.

- Variants of the same radical are separated by forward slashes (for example 彐/ヨ/⺕)
- The first radical on the list (口) is the most frequent and can be seen in 2,839 kanji
- The last radical on the list (斉) is the least frequent and can be seen in 5 kanji

List of kanji radicals by frequency
口, 一, 丿/ノ, 丨, 日, 木, ハ/八/丷, 二, 丶, 土, 十, 田, 艹/艸/草/䒑, 目, 亠, 冂, 大, 小/⺌/⺍, 月, 水/氵, 儿, 勹, 厶, 幺, 冖, 人/亻/𠂉/𠆢, 又, 匕, 王, 金, 手/扌, 貝, 宀, 厂, 虫, 糸, 女, 亅, 言, 止, 立, 心/忄/㣺, 山, 乙, 彐/ヨ/⺕, 尸, 廾, 卜, 夂, 戈, 冫, 禾, 隹, ⺮/竹, 火/灬, ⻌/辶, 广, 寸, 米, 攵, 凵, 几, 罒, 刀/刂/⺈, 士, 白, 囗, 石, 巾, 車, ⺤/爪, 匚, 力, 彡, 工, 皿, 夕, 衣/衤, 足, 弓, •⻏, 子, 干, 已, 豆, ⻖•, 耳, 門, 方, 馬, 卩, 彳, 斤, 頁, 雨, 比, 羽, 羊, 酉, 虍, 豕, 里, 欠, マ, 勿, 殳, 牛, 西/覀/襾, 氏, 矢, 示, 艮, 甘, 耂/老, 自, 辛, 疋, 丬/爿, 示/礻, 戸, 長, 見, 臣, 犬/犭, 用, 九, 舟, 予/矛, 而, 歹, 冊, 弋, 巴, 音, 穴, ⺻/聿/書, 食, 至, 入, 缶, 生, 角, 元, 乃, 廴, 尢, 父, 走, 辰, 世, 川, 疒, 亡, 文, 也, 母, 毋, 癶, 高, 行, 舌, 谷, 青, 身, 斗, 品, 五, 免, 屯, 皮, 赤, 井, 毛, 气, 血, 無, 首, 岡, 啇, 斉

=== The 79 Radicals ===
A simplification used in "The Kanji Dictionary", "The Learner's Kanji Dictionary," "Japanese, Chinese, and Korean Surnames and How to Read Them", and in "Kanji & Kana."

Strokes	Radical	Variations	Position
2	亻	人 𠆢	◧
2	冫	冫	◧
2	子	了	◧
2	⻖		◧
2	卩		◨
2	刂	リ 刀	◨
2	力		◨
2	又		◨
2	冖		◨
2	亠		⊤
2	十	十	⊤
2	⺊	卜	⊤
2	⺈		⊤
2	丷	八 ハ	⊤
2	厂		⿴
2	⻌	辶 廴	⿴
2	冂	冂 𠘨	⿴
2	𠘨		⿴
2	匚		⿴
3	氵	水 泳 氺	◧
3	土	土	◧
3	扌	手	◧
3	口	口	◧
3	女		◧
3	巾		◧
3	犭	犬	◧
3	彳		◧
3	弓		◧
3	彡		◨
3	艹		⊤
3	宀		⊤
3	⺌	小 ⺍	⊤
3	山		⊤
3	士		⊤
3	广		⿴
3	尸		⿴
3	囗		⿴
4	木		◧
4	月		◧
4	日		◧
4	火	灬	◧
4	礻	示	◧
4	王	玉	◧
4	牛		◧
4	方		◧
4	攵	夂 夂	◨
4	欠		◨
4	心	心 忄 ⺗	⊥
4	戸	戶	⿴
4	戈	弋	⿴
5	石		◧
5	立	立	◧
5	目		◧
5	禾		◧
5	衤	衣	◧
5	田		⊤
5	罒		⊤
5	皿		⊥
5	疒		⿴
6	糸		◧
6	米		◧
6	舟		◧
6	虫		◧
6	耳		◧
6	⺮	竹	⊤
7	言		◧
7	貝		◧
7	車		◧
7	⻊	足	◧
7	酉		◧
8	金		◧
8	飠	食 飠	◧
8	隹		◨
8	⻗	雨 ⻗	⊤
8	門	鬥	⿴
9	頁		◨
10	馬		◨
11	魚		◧
11	鳥		◨

== See also ==
- List of kanji radicals by stroke count
- List of Unicode radicals
- Kangxi radical
