= Radical 117 =

Chinese character radical

立
- Radical 117 (U+2F74)
- 立 (U+7ACB) "stand, erect"

Pronunciations
- Pinyin: lì
- Bopomofo: ㄌㄧˋ
- Wade–Giles: li4
- Cantonese Yale: laap6
- Jyutping: laap6, lap6
- Japanese Kana: リュウ ryū / リツ ritsu (on'yomi) た-つ ta-tsu / た-てる ta-teru (kun'yomi)
- Sino-Korean: 립 rip

Names
- Chinese name(s): (Left) 立字旁 lìzìpáng (Top) 立字頭/立字头 lìzìtóu
- Japanese name(s): 立/たつ tatsu (Left) 立偏/たつへん tatsuhen
- Hangul: 설 seol

Stroke order animation

Radical 117 or radical stand (立部) meaning "stand" is one of the 23 Kangxi radicals (214 radicals in total) composed of 5 strokes.

In the Kangxi Dictionary, there are 101 characters (out of 49,030) to be found under this radical.

立 is also the 116th indexing component in the Table of Indexing Chinese Character Components predominantly adopted by Simplified Chinese dictionaries published in mainland China.

== Evolution ==
A person (大) on the ground; unrelated to 立 in 辛, 音 and 龍

Oracle bone script character

Bronze script character

Small seal script character

== Derived characters ==
Strokes	Characters
+0	立
+2	竌 竍
+3	竎 竏
+4	竐 竑 竒 (=奇 -> 大) 竓 竔 竕 竖^{SC} (=豎 -> 豆) 竗
+5	竘 站 竚 (=佇 -> 人) 竛 竜^{Chiefly JP} (=龍 -> 龍) 竝 (=並 -> 一) 竞^{SC} (=競)
+6	竡
+7	竢 (=俟 -> 人) 竣 竤 (=竑) 童 竦 竧
+8	竨 竩 竪^{JP/GB TC} (=豎 -> 豆) 竫 靖
+9	竬 竭 端 竰
+11	竮 竱
+12	竲 竳 竴
+13	竵 (=歪 -> 止)
+15	競 竷
+17	竸

== Sinogram ==
As an independent sinogram it is one of the kyōiku kanji or kanji taught in elementary school in Japan. It is a first grade kanji and means to stand up.
