= Pig (zodiac) =

Sign of the Chinese zodiac

- "Pig" in Traditional (top) and Simplified (bottom) Chinese characters
- Traditional Chinese: 豬
- Simplified Chinese: 猪
Transcriptions
Standard Mandarin
- Hanyu Pinyin: zhū
- Wade–Giles: chu^{1}
- IPA: [ʈʂú]
Hakka
- Romanization: chû
Yue: Cantonese
- Yale Romanization: jyū
- Jyutping: zyu1
- IPA: [tsy˥]
Southern Min
- Hokkien POJ: ti / tir / tu
Eastern Min
- Fuzhou BUC: dṳ̆
Northern Min
- Jian'ou Romanized: kṳ̌
Old Chinese
- Baxter–Sagart (2014): *tra

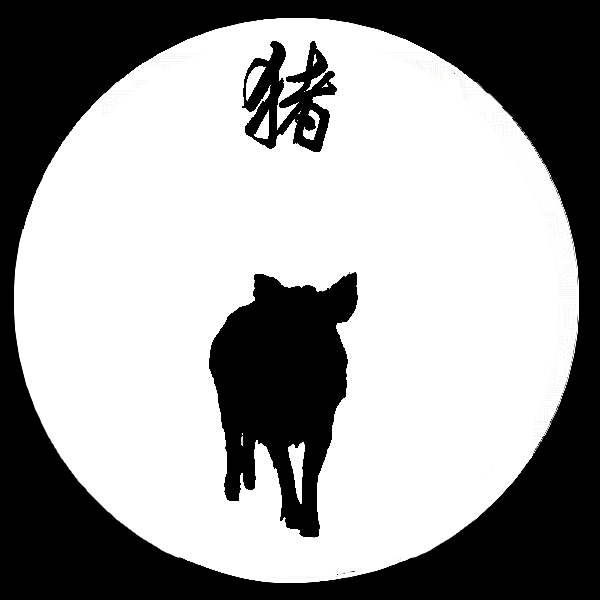
Zodiac pig, showing the zhū (猪) character for pig

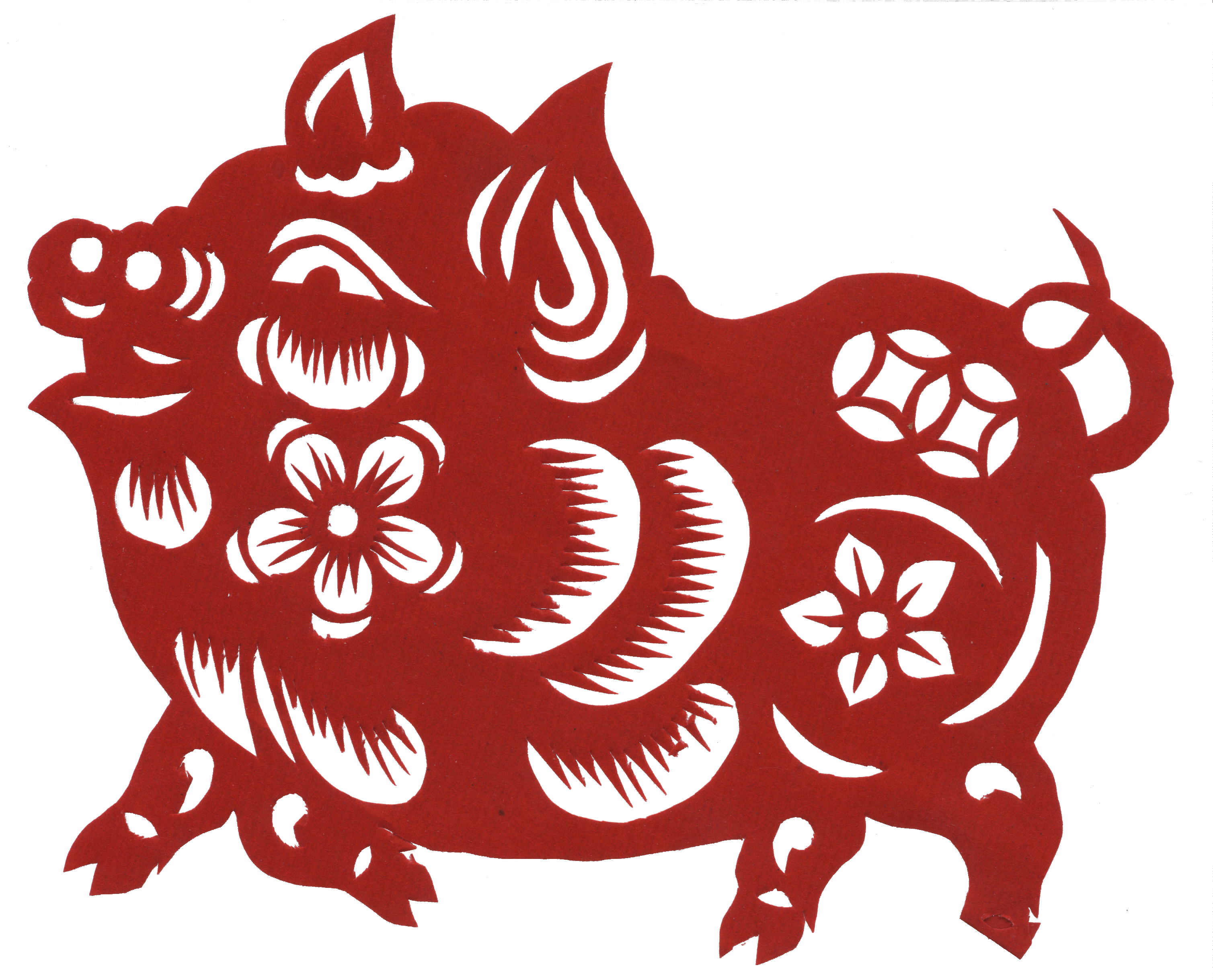
Chinese paper cutting

The Pig (豬) or sometimes translated as the Boar is the twelfth of the 12-year cycle of animals which appear in Chinese zodiac, in relation to the Chinese calendar and system of horology, and paralleling the system of ten Heavenly Stems and twelve Earthly Branches. Although the term "zodiac" (etymologically referring to a "[circle of] little animals") is used in the phrase "Chinese zodiac", there is a major difference between the Chinese usage and Western astrology: the zodiacal animals (including the zodiacal Pig) do not relate to the zodiac as the area of the sky that extends approximately 8° north or south (as measured in celestial latitude) of the ecliptic, the apparent path of the Sun, the Moon, and visible planets across the celestial sphere's constellations, over the course of the year.

In Chinese astrology, "zodiacal" animals refer to fixed cycles of twelve animals. The same cycle of twelve is used for cycles of years and cycles of hours. In the case of years, the cycle of twelve corresponds to the twelve-year cycle of Jupiter. In the case of the hours, the twelve hours represent twelve double-hours for each period of night and day. In the continuous sexagenary cycle of sixty years, every twelfth year corresponds to hai, 亥 (the twelfth of the twelve Earthly Branches); this re-recurring twelfth year is commonly called the Year of the Pig (豬年).

There are five types of Pigs, named after the Chinese elements. In order, they are: Metal, Water, Wood, Fire, and Earth. These correspond to the Heavenly Stems. Thus, there are five pig years in every sexagenary cycle. For example, in the year 2019, the Earthly Branch is the twelfth, hài, and the Heavenly Stem is the sixth, jǐ 己. The Chinese New Year in 2019 is February fifth: this corresponds with the beginning of both the sexegenary year of jǐ hài and also the zodiac year of the Earth Pig.

In the Japanese zodiac and the Tibetan zodiac, the Pig is referred to as the boar. In the Dai zodiac, the Pig is replaced by the elephant. In the Gurung zodiac, the Pig is replaced by the deer. The Malay zodiac replaces the Pig with the tortoise.

== Pig in the Chinese zodiac legend ==
According to the myths, the Pig was the last to arrive when the Jade Emperor called for the great meeting. Other sources said that Buddha called for a great meeting when he was about to leave the Earth. The Pig arrived last.

Yet another legend has it that The Emperor organized a race to ascertain the order of the animals in the Zodiac. The pig not having arrived long after all of the other animals, he was about to call it a day when an oink and squeal were heard. The term "lazy pig" comes from this incident; the Pig had become hungry during the race, stopped for a feast, and then promptly fell asleep. The pig finally completed the race, however, and was accordingly named the 12th and last animal of the zodiac cycle.

Other sources say that given his very stout form, he was just too slow a swimmer, and thus he could not do anything against the other animals (or conversely that he was so fast he went up the wrong side of the river first).

== Years and the Five Elements ==
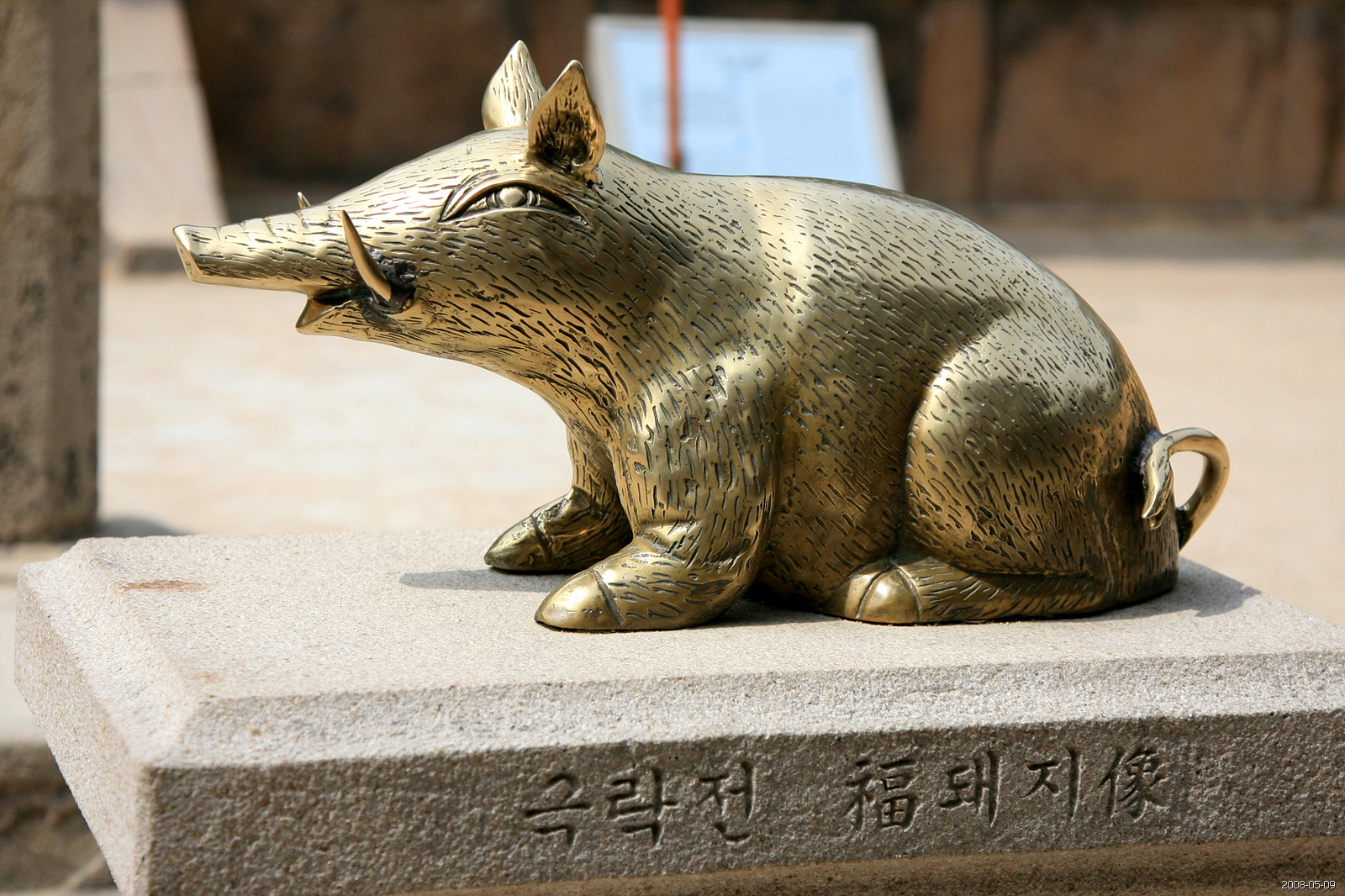
A statue of the Pig at Bulguksa in Gyeongju, North Gyeongsang Province, South Korea

=== The Pig and the Elements ===
The natural element of the Pig is Water. Thus, it is commonly associated with emotions and intuitions. Yet, given that along with the elements (called the Celestial stem), the animal zodiac (called the Earthly stem) also follows a cycle, each of the elements affect the characteristic of the same Earthly stem (see Sexagenary cycle).

However, the Pig is yin, and thus only the negative aspects of the elements can be attached to them, thus only 5 kinds of Pigs are found in the zodiac. They are the following:

乙亥 (yǐhài) – Wood Pig
丁亥 (dīnghài) – Fire Pig
己亥 (jǐhài) – Earth Pig
辛亥 (xīnhài) – Metal Pig
癸亥 (guǐhài) – Water Pig

=== The Years of the Pig ===
Sexagenary cycle years

People born within these date ranges can be said to have been born in the "Year of the Pig", while bearing the following elemental sign:

Start date	End date	Heavenly Branch
4 February 1935	23 January 1936	Wood Pig
22 January 1947	9 February 1948	Fire Pig
8 February 1959	27 January 1960	Earth Pig
27 January 1971	14 February 1972	Metal Pig
13 February 1983	1 February 1984	Water Pig
31 January 1995	18 February 1996	Wood Pig
18 February 2007	6 February 2008	Fire Pig
5 February 2019	24 January 2020	Earth Pig
23 January 2031	10 February 2032	Metal Pig
10 February 2043	29 January 2044	Water Pig
28 January 2055	14 February 2056	Wood Pig
14 February 2067	2 February 2068	Fire Pig
2 February 2079	21 January 2080	Earth Pig
18 February 2091	6 February 2092	Metal Pig
7 February 2103	28 January 2104	Water Pig

== Hour of the Pig ==
Similarly to the usage of the traditional Japanese clock, each day-night period was divided into 12 double-hours, each of which corresponding with one of the twelve signs of the Chinese zodiac, with similar symbolic motif and astrological significance. The first of the twelve double hours (the Hour of the Rat) encompasses midnight, at the middle of the double hour, corresponding with 11:00 p.m. to 1:00 a.m., with midnight being the midpoint of the first double-hour. The animals in the hourly sequence are the same and in the same order as in the yearly sequence. The Pig is the last in the sequence, with the Hour of the Pig corresponding to the double-hour 9:00 p.m. to 11:00 p.m., also known as the hour hai (亥).

Given that the traditional Chinese day-night cycle was composed of 12 hours, each sign is given to the different signs of the zodiac. The Pig is assigned to govern the time between 21:00 hrs to 22:59 hrs. According to tradition, this is the time when the Pig is doing what it does best (sleeping and enjoying the sweet life).

In terms of astrology, the hours in which people were born (technically termed as the Ascendant) are the second most important facet of their astrology. Thus, this alters greatly the characteristics. Even if people were born in any year governed by another animal (for example, anyone born on 20 December 2000, i.e. year of the Dragon) will display strong characteristics of the Pig. Thus, they may be fierce and strong like the Dragon, but at the same time emotional and intuitive like the Pig.

== Basic astrology elements ==
Earthly Branches of Birth Year:	亥 Hai
The Five Elements:	Water
The Five Planets:	Mercury
Cardinal Point:	North-North-West(NNW)
Yin/ Yang:	Yin
Lunar Month:	November 7 to December 7
Earthly Branch Ruling Hours:	21:00 to 22:59
Twelve Heavenly Generals:	Sanskrit: Vikala (Hanzi: 毘羯羅)
Lucky Flowers:	Hydrangea and Daisy
Lucky Numbers:	2, 5, 6, 8; Avoid: 3, 4, 9
Lucky Colors:	Yellow, gray, brown Avoid: red, blue
Lucky/Associated Countries:	Lebanon, Albania, Uruguay, Slovenia, Pakistan, Portugal

== Cultural notes ==
Some Chinese Muslims will say that they were born in the year of the hai, 亥 (twelfth and final year of the zodiac) to avoid saying the "Pig". This is because pigs are haram (forbidden to eat) in Islam and therefore Muslims consider pigs unclean. In Muslim-majority Malaysia, businesses avoid illustrations or displays of pigs to avoid attracting controversy, despite no explicit bans from the government.

Increasing numbers of countries and regions now issue lunar new year stamps. For the 2019 Year of the Pig, the USC U.S.-China Institute collected stamps from 56 jurisdictions.

== See also ==
- Pig
- Chinese astrology
- Chinese calendar correspondence table
- Traditional Chinese timekeeping
- Burmese zodiac
