= Radical 2 =

Kangxi radical

丨
- Radical 2 (U+2F01)
- 丨 (U+4E28) "line, stick"

Pronunciations
- Pinyin: gǔn
- Bopomofo: ㄍㄨㄣˇ
- Gwoyeu Romatzyh: goen
- Wade–Giles: kun^{3}
- Cantonese Yale: kwán
- Jyutping: kwan2
- Pe̍h-ōe-jī: khún
- Japanese Kana: コン kon (on'yomi) ぼう bō (kun'yomi)
- Sino-Korean: 곤 gonn
- Hán-Việt: cổn

Names
- Chinese name(s): 豎/竖/竪 shù
- Japanese name(s): 棒/ぼう bō (stick) 縦棒/たてぼう tatebō (vertical stick)
- Hangul: 뚫을 tturheul

Stroke order animation

Radical 2 or radical line (丨部) meaning "vertically connected" is one of 6 of the 214 Kangxi radicals that are composed of only one stroke.

In the Kangxi Dictionary, there are only 21 characters (out of 49,030) to be found under this radical.

丨 is also the 2nd indexing component in the Table of Indexing Chinese Character Components predominantly adopted by Simplified Chinese dictionaries published in mainland China, with 亅 being its associated indexing component (used to be associated with 乛 prior to the new standard in 2009).

== Evolution ==
Large seal script character

Small seal script character

== Derived characters ==
Strokes	Characters
+0	丨
+1	丩
+2	个^{SC/variant} (=個 -> 人) 丫
+3	中 丮 丯 丰^{SC/JP}/丰^{TC} (also SC/JP form of 豐 -> 豆) 书^{SC} (=書 -> 曰)
+4	丱
+6	串
+7	丳
+8	临^{SC} (=臨 -> 臣)
+9	丵

== In calligraphy ==
The vertical line as in 永

The only stroke in radical line, known as 豎/竖/竪 shù "vertical", is called 努 nǔ in the eight principles of the character 永 (永字八法 Yǒngzì Bāfǎ) which are the basis of Chinese calligraphy.

== Literature ==
- Fazzioli, Edoardo (1987). Chinese calligraphy : from pictograph to ideogram : the history of 214 essential Chinese/Japanese characters. calligraphy by Rebecca Hon Ko. New York: Abbeville Press. ISBN 0-89659-774-1.
- Leyi, Li (1993). Tracing the Roots of Chinese Characters: 500 Cases. Beijing. ISBN 978-7-5619-0204-2.
