= Radical 6 =

Chinese character radical

亅
- Radical 6 (U+2F05)
- 亅 (U+4E85) "hook"

Pronunciations
- Pinyin: jué
- Bopomofo: ㄐㄩㄝˊ
- Wade–Giles: chüeh2
- Cantonese Yale: kyut
- Jyutping: kyut3
- Pe̍h-ōe-jī: koat
- Japanese Kana: ケツ ketsu (on'yomi)
- Sino-Korean: 궐 gwol
- Hán-Việt: quyết

Names
- Chinese name(s): 豎鉤/豎鈎/竖钩 shùgōu
- Japanese name(s): 撥棒/はねぼう hanebō かぎ kagi
- Hangul: 갈고리 galgori

Stroke order animation

Radical 6 or radical hook (亅部) meaning "hook" is one of 6 of the 214 Kangxi radicals that are composed of only one stroke.

In the Kangxi Dictionary, there are 19 characters (out of 49,030) to be found under this radical.

In Simplified Chinese, this radical is merged to Radical 2 丨. In the Table of Indexing Chinese Character Components, 亅 is listed as an associated indexing component of 丨. However, it is often omitted in mainstream dictionaries, including Xiandai Hanyu Cidian.

== Evolution ==
Small seal script character

== Derived characters ==
Strokes	Characters
+0	亅
+1	了
+2	亇 (=个 -> 丨 / 個 -> 人)
+3	予
+5	争^{SC/JP} (=爭 -> 爪)
+7	亊 (=事)
+8	事

== Literature ==
- Fazzioli, Edoardo (1987). Chinese calligraphy : from pictograph to ideogram : the history of 214 essential Chinese/Japanese characters. calligraphy by Rebecca Hon Ko. New York: Abbeville Press. ISBN 0-89659-774-1.
- Leyi, Li (1993). Tracing the Roots of Chinese Characters: 500 Cases. Beijing. ISBN 978-7-5619-0204-2.
