= Radical 20 =

Chinese character radical

勹
- Radical 20 (U+2F13)
- 勹 (U+52F9) "wrap"

Pronunciations
- Pinyin: bāo
- Bopomofo: ㄅㄠ
- Wade–Giles: pao1
- Cantonese Yale: baau1
- Jyutping: baau1
- Pe̍h-ōe-jī: pau
- Japanese Kana: ホウ hō (on'yomi) つつ-む tsutsu-mu (kun'yomi)
- Sino-Korean: 포 po
- Hán-Việt: bao

Names
- Chinese name(s): 包字頭/包字头 bāozìtóu
- Japanese name(s): 包構/つつみがまえ tsutsumigamae
- Hangul: 쌀 ssal

Stroke order animation

Radical 20 or radical wrap (勹部) meaning "wrap" is one of the 23 Kangxi radicals (214 radicals total) composed of 2 strokes. In the Kangxi Dictionary, there are 64 characters (out of 49,030) to be found under this radical. 勹 is also the 13th indexing component in the Table of Indexing Chinese Character Components predominantly adopted by Simplified Chinese dictionaries published in mainland China.

== Evolution ==
=== 勹 ===
Compare 人, 匕 and 尸.

Oracle bone script character

bronze script character

Small seal script character

=== 包 (to wrap up) ===
fetus (巳) in the womb (勹), or a swaddled baby.

Qin slip script

Large seal script

Small seal script

=== 勿 ===
Original character of 刎 ("to cut"); loangraph for "do not".

Shang dynasty Oracle bone script

Western Zhou bronze script

Chu slip and silk script

Large seal script character

Small seal script character

=== 匆 ===
Traditional: 怱, variant of 悤. Heart (心) with a dot.

Shang dynasty Oracle bone script

Western Zhou bronze script

Spring and Autumn period bronze script

Qin slip script

Small seal script character

== Derived characters ==
Strokes	Characters
+0	勹
+1	勺
+2	勻 勼 勽 勾 勿 匀^{SC/variant} (=勻) 匁^{JP} 匂^{JP}
+3	匃 匄 包 匆 匇
+4	匈
+5	匉
+6	匊 匋 匌
+7	匍
+8	匎
+9	匏 匐
+10	匑 匒
+11	匓
+14	匔

== Literature ==
- Fazzioli, Edoardo (1987). Chinese calligraphy : from pictograph to ideogram : the history of 214 essential Chinese/Japanese characters. calligraphy by Rebecca Hon Ko. New York: Abbeville Press. ISBN 0-89659-774-1.
- Lunde, Ken (Jan 5, 2009). "Appendix J: Japanese Character Sets" (PDF). CJKV Information Processing: Chinese, Japanese, Korean & Vietnamese Computing (Second ed.). Sebastopol, Calif.: O'Reilly Media. ISBN 978-0-596-51447-1.
