= Radical 139 =

Chinese character radical

色
- Radical 139 (U+2F8A)
- 色 (U+8272) "colour, form"

Pronunciations
- Pinyin: sè
- Bopomofo: ㄙㄜˋ
- Wade–Giles: se4
- Cantonese Yale: sik1
- Jyutping: sik1
- Japanese Kana: ショク shoku / シキ shiki (on'yomi) いろ iro (kun'yomi)
- Sino-Korean: 색 saek

Names
- Japanese name(s): 色/いろ iro
- Hangul: 빛 bit

Stroke order animation

Radical 139 or radical colour (色部) meaning "colour" or "form" is one of the 29 Kangxi radicals (214 radicals in total) composed of 6 strokes.

In the Kangxi Dictionary, there are 21 characters (out of 49,030) to be found under this radical.

色 is also the 140th indexing component in the Table of Indexing Chinese Character Components predominantly adopted by Simplified Chinese dictionaries published in mainland China.

== Evolution ==
Ideogrammic compound 爪 (“claw; hand”) + 卩 (“kneeling person”), originally meant "to press down", later borrowed phonetically to mean "color".

Spring and Autumn period bronze script

Chu slip and silk script

Qin slip script

Shuowen ancient script

Large seal script character

Small seal script character

== Derived characters ==
Strokes	Characters
+0	色
+4	艳^{SC} (=豔 -> 豆)
+5	艴
+8	艵
+13	艶^{JP} (=豔 -> 豆)
+18	艷^{GB TC} (=豔 -> 豆)

== Sinogram ==
The radical is also used as an independent Chinese character. It is one of the kyōiku kanji or kanji taught in elementary school in Japan. It is a second grade kanji.

== Literature ==
- Fazzioli, Edoardo (1987). Chinese calligraphy : from pictograph to ideogram : the history of 214 essential Chinese/Japanese characters. calligraphy by Rebecca Hon Ko. New York: Abbeville Press. ISBN 0-89659-774-1.
- Lunde, Ken (Jan 5, 2009). "Appendix J: Japanese Character Sets" (PDF). CJKV Information Processing: Chinese, Japanese, Korean & Vietnamese Computing (Second ed.). Sebastopol, Calif.: O'Reilly Media. ISBN 978-0-596-51447-1.
