= Radical 137 =

Chinese character radical

舟
- Radical 137 (U+2F88)
- 舟 (U+821F) "boat"

Pronunciations
- Pinyin: zhōu
- Bopomofo: ㄓㄡ
- Wade–Giles: chou1
- Cantonese Yale: jau1
- Jyutping: zau1
- Japanese Kana: シュウ shū / シュ shu (on'yomi) ふね fune (kun'yomi)
- Sino-Korean: 주 ju

Names
- Chinese name(s): 舟字旁 zhōuzìpáng
- Japanese name(s): 舟/ふね fune 舟偏/ふねへん funehen
- Hangul: 배 bae

Stroke order animation

Radical 137 or radical boat (舟部) meaning "boat" is one of the 29 Kangxi radicals (214 radicals in total) composed of 6 strokes.

In the Kangxi Dictionary, there are 197 characters (out of 49,030) to be found under this radical.

舟 is also the 139th indexing component in the Table of Indexing Chinese Character Components predominantly adopted by Simplified Chinese dictionaries published in mainland China.

== Evolution ==
Shang dynasty Oracle bone script

Shang dynasty Bronze script

Western Zhou Bronze script

Large seal script character

Small seal script character

月 in 前 came from this character

== Derived characters ==
Strokes	Characters
+0	舟
+2	舠 䑠
+3	舡 舢 舣^{SC} (=艤) 舤 䑡 䑢 䑣
+4	舥 舦 舧 舨 舩 (=船) 航 舫 般 舭 舮 (=艫) 舯 舰^{SC} (=艦) 舱^{SC} (=艙) 䑤 䑥
+5	舲 舳 舴 舵 舶 舷 舸 船 舺 舻^{SC} (=艫) 䑦 䑧 䑨 䑩
+6	舼 舽 舾 舿 䑪 䑫 䑬 䑭 䑮
+7	艀 艁 (=造 -> 辵) 艂 艃 艄 艅 艆 艇 艈 (=毓 -> 毋) 艉 䑯 䑰
+8	艊 艋 艌 艍 䑱 䑲 (=櫂 -> 木) 䑳 䑴 䑵 䑶 䑷 䑸
+9	艎 艏 艐 艑 艒 艓 艔 䑹 䑺 䑻
+10	艕 艖 艗 艘 艙 䑼 䑽 䑾
+11	艚 艛 艜 艝 䑿 䒀 䒁 䒂 䒃 䒄 䒅
+12	艞 艟 艠 䒆 䒇 䒈
+13	艡 艢 (=檣 -> 木) 艣 (=櫓 -> 木) 艤 艥
+14	艦 艧 艨 艩 䒉
+15	艪 (=櫓)
+16	艫
+17	艬
+18	艭

== Literature ==
- Fazzioli, Edoardo (1987). Chinese calligraphy : from pictograph to ideogram : the history of 214 essential Chinese/Japanese characters. calligraphy by Rebecca Hon Ko. New York: Abbeville Press. ISBN 0-89659-774-1.
