= Radical 67 =

Chinese character radical

文
- Radical 67 (U+2F42)
- 文 (U+6587) "script, literature"

Pronunciations
- Pinyin: wén
- Bopomofo: ㄨㄣˊ
- Gwoyeu Romatzyh: wen
- Wade–Giles: wên^{2}
- Cantonese Yale: màhn, mahn
- Jyutping: man4, man6
- Pe̍h-ōe-jī: bûn
- Japanese Kana: ブン bun / モン mon (on'yomi) ふみ fumi (kun'yomi)
- Sino-Korean: 문 mun
- Hán-Việt: văn

Names
- Chinese name(s): (Top) 文字頭/文字头 wénzìtóu 文字旁 wénzìpáng
- Japanese name(s): 文/ぶん bun 文繞/ぶんにょう bunnyō 文旁/ふみづくり fumizukuri
- Hangul: 글월 geurwol

Stroke order animation

Radical 67 or radical script (文部) meaning "script" or "literature" is one of the 34 Kangxi radicals (214 radicals in total) composed of 4 strokes.

In the Kangxi Dictionary, there are 26 characters (out of 49,030) to be found under this radical.

文 is also the 93rd indexing component in the Table of Indexing Chinese Character Components predominantly adopted by Simplified Chinese dictionaries published in mainland China.

== Evolution ==
A person with tattooed chest. Unrelated to 又, 攵.

Oracle bone script

Oracle bone script variant

Bronze script

Chu slip and silk script

Large seal script

Small seal script

== Derived characters ==
Strokes	Characters
+0	文
+2	齐^{SC} (=齊 -> 齊) 刘^{SC} (=劉 -> 刀)
+4	斉^{JP} (=齊 -> 齊)
+6	斊 斋^{SC} (=齋 -> 齊)
+7	斍 (=覺 -> 見) 斎^{JP} (=齋 -> 齊) 斏
+8	斌 斐 斑
+9	斒
+12	斓^{SC} (=斕)
+15	斔
+17	斕
+19	斖

The Unihan database classifies the Simplified Chinese character 齐 and Japanese shinjitai 斉 and 斎 under this radical. However, 齐 actually belongs to radical 齐 (齊) (Simplified Chinese characters radical #140, =Kangxi Radical 210) in mainland China's standard and Simplified Chinese dictionaries; 斉 and 斎 usually falls under radical 斉 (齊) (or "齊 (斉)" depending on each dictionary's standard) in Japanese dictionaries.

== Sinogram ==
The radical is also used as an independent Chinese character. It is one of the Kyōiku kanji or kanji taught in elementary school in Japan. It is a first grade kanji.

== Literature ==
- Fazzioli, Edoardo (1987). Chinese calligraphy : from pictograph to ideogram : the history of 214 essential Chinese/Japanese characters. calligraphy by Rebecca Hon Ko. New York: Abbeville Press. ISBN 0-89659-774-1.
- Lunde, Ken (Jan 5, 2009). "Appendix J: Japanese Character Sets" (PDF). CJKV Information Processing: Chinese, Japanese, Korean & Vietnamese Computing (Second ed.). Sebastopol, Calif.: O'Reilly Media. ISBN 978-0-596-51447-1.
