= Radical 97 =

Chinese character radical

瓜
- Radical 97 (U+2F60)
- 瓜 (U+74DC) "melon"

Pronunciations
- Pinyin: guā
- Bopomofo: ㄍㄨㄚ
- Wade–Giles: kua1
- Cantonese Yale: gwā
- Jyutping: gwaa1
- Japanese Kana: カ ka (on'yomi) うり uri (kun'yomi)
- Sino-Korean: 과 gwa

Names
- Chinese name(s): 瓜字旁 guāzìpáng
- Japanese name(s): 瓜/うり uri
- Hangul: 오이 oi

Stroke order animation

Radical 97 or radical melon (瓜部) meaning "melon" is one of the 23 Kangxi radicals (214 radicals in total) composed of 5 strokes (6 strokes in Japanese).

In the Kangxi Dictionary, there are 55 characters (out of 49,030) to be found under this radical.

瓜 is also the 113th indexing component in the Table of Indexing Chinese Character Components predominantly adopted by Simplified Chinese dictionaries published in mainland China.

== Evolution ==
Unrelated to 厶 and 爪.

Warring States period bronze script

Large seal script character

Small seal script character

== Derived characters ==
Strokes	Characters
+0	瓜
+3	瓝
+5	瓞 瓟
+6	瓠
+8	瓡
+11	瓢
+14	瓣
+17	瓤
+19	瓥

== Variant forms ==
There is a design nuance between the form of 瓜 in modern Japanese and in other languages. Traditionally, the character consists of five strokes. In Japanese kanji simplification, however, the third stroke (i.e. a vertical-horizontal turning stroke) was broken into two strokes, and 瓜 became a six-stroke radical character. This change also applies to hyōgai kanji.

Chinese (Mainland China)	Chinese (Taiwan)	Modern Japanese
瓜	瓜	瓜
瓞	瓞	瓞

== Literature ==
- Fazzioli, Edoardo (1987). Chinese calligraphy : from pictograph to ideogram : the history of 214 essential Chinese/Japanese characters. calligraphy by Rebecca Hon Ko. New York: Abbeville Press. ISBN 0-89659-774-1.
- Lunde, Ken (Jan 5, 2009). "Appendix J: Japanese Character Sets" (PDF). CJKV Information Processing: Chinese, Japanese, Korean & Vietnamese Computing (Second ed.). Sebastopol, Calif.: O'Reilly Media. ISBN 978-0-596-51447-1.
