= Radical 143 =

Chinese character radical

血
- Radical 143 (U+2F8E)
- 血 (U+8840) "blood"

Pronunciations
- Pinyin: xuè
- Bopomofo: ㄒㄩㄝˋ
- Wade–Giles: hsüeh4
- Cantonese Yale: hyut3
- Jyutping: hyut3
- Japanese Kana: ケツ ketsu / ケチ kechi (on'yomi) ち chi (kun'yomi)
- Sino-Korean: 혈 hyeol

Names
- Japanese name(s): 血/ち chi (Left) 血偏/ちへん chihen
- Hangul: 피 pi

Stroke order animation

Radical 143 or radical blood (血部) meaning "blood" is one of the 29 Kangxi radicals (214 radicals in total) composed of 6 strokes.

In the Kangxi Dictionary, there are 60 characters (out of 49,030) to be found under this radical.

血 is also the 138th indexing component in the Table of Indexing Chinese Character Components predominantly adopted by Simplified Chinese dictionaries published in mainland China.

== Evolution ==
Ideogrammic compound 一 (“drop of blood”) + 皿 (“container”)

Oracle bone script character

Chu slip and silk script

Qin slip script

Large seal script character

Small seal script character

== Derived characters ==
Strokes	Characters
+0	血
+3	衁 衂 (=衄)
+4	衃 衄
+5	衅^{SC} (=釁 -> 酉)
+6	衆^{JP/KO/GB TC} (=眾 -> 目) 衇 (=脈 -> 肉) 衈 衉
+15	衊
+18	衋

== Sinogram ==
As an independent sinogram it is one of the kyōiku kanji or kanji taught in elementary school in Japan. It is a third grade kanji.
