= Radical 9 =

Chinese character radical

亻
- Radical 9 (U+2F08)
- 亻 (U+4EBB) "component-only side form of 人"

Names
- Chinese name(s): 單人旁/单人旁 dānrénpáng, 單立人/单立人 dānlìrén
- Japanese name(s): 人偏/にんべん ninben

Stroke order animation

人
- Radical 9 (U+2F08)
- 人 (U+4EBA) "man"

Pronunciations
- Pinyin: rén
- Bopomofo: ㄖㄣˊ
- Gwoyeu Romatzyh: ren
- Wade–Giles: jên^{2}
- Cantonese Yale: yàhn
- Jyutping: jan4
- Pe̍h-ōe-jī: jîn
- Japanese Kana: ジン jin / ニン nin (on'yomi) ひと hito (kun'yomi)
- Sino-Korean: 인 in
- Hán-Việt: nhân

Names
- Japanese name(s): (𠆢) 人屋根/ひとやね hitoyane, 人頭/ひとがしら hitogashira, 人冠/ひとかんむり hitokanmuri
- Hangul: 사람 saram

Stroke order animation

Radical 9 or radical man (人部) meaning "person" is a Kangxi radical. Of the 214 radicals, Radical 9 is one of 23 which are composed of 2 strokes.

When appearing at the left side of a Chinese character, it usually transforms into 亻.

In the Kangxi Dictionary, there are 794 characters (out of 49,030) to be found under this radical.

人 is also the 12th indexing component in the Table of Indexing Chinese Character Components predominantly adopted by Simplified Chinese dictionaries published in mainland China. Two associated indexing components, 亻 and 入 (formerly Radical 11), are affiliated to the principal indexing component 人.

== Evolution ==
Compare 刀, 匕, 卩, 大 and 氏; unrelated to 入 and 㫃.

Shang oracle bone script

Shang bronze script

Western Zhou bronze script

Warring States bronze script

Chu slip and silk script

Qin slip script

Liushutong large seal script

Shuowen seal script

== Derived characters ==
Strokes	Characters
+0	人 亻^{component only}
+1	亼 亽 亾 (=亡 -> 亠) 亿^{SC} (=億)
+2	什 仁 仂 仃 仄 仅^{SC} (=僅) 仆 仇 仈 仉 今 介 仌 仍 从^{SC/variant} (=從) 仏^{JP} (=佛) 仐 仑^{SC} (=侖 / 崙 -> 山) 仒 仓^{SC} (=倉)
+3	仔 仕 他 仗 付 仙 仚 仛 仜 仝 仞 仟 仠 仡 仢 代 令^{SC}/令^{TC}/令^{JP} 以 仦 仧 (=長 -> 長) 仨 仩 仪^{SC} (=儀) 仫 们^{SC} (=們) 仭 (=仞)
+4	仮 仯 仰 仱 仲 仳 仴 仵 件 价 (also SC form of 價) 仸 仹 仺 任 仼 份 仾 仿 伀 企 伂 伃 伄 伅 伆 伇 伈 伉 伊 伋 伌 伍 伎 伏 伐 休 伒 伓 伔 伕 伖 众^{SC} (=眾 -> 目) 优^{SC} (=優) 伙 会^{SC/JP} (=會 -> 曰) 伛^{SC} (=傴) 伜^{JP nonstandard} (=倅) 伝^{JP} (=傳) 伞^{SC} (=傘) 伟^{SC} (=偉) 传^{SC} (=傳) 伡^{SC} (=俥) 伢 伣^{SC} (=俔) 伤^{SC} (=傷) 伥^{SC} (=倀) 伦^{SC} (=倫) 伧^{SC} (=傖) 伨 伩 (=信) 伪^{SC} (=偽/僞) 伫^{SC} (=佇) 伬
+5	伭 伮 伯 估 伱 (=你) 伲 伳 伴 伵 伶 伷 伸 伹 伺 伻 似 伽 伾 伿 佀 (=似) 佁 佂 佃 佄 佅 但 佇 佈 佉 佊 佋 佌 位 低 住 佐 佑 佒 体 (also SC/JP/variant form of 體 ->骨) 佔 何 佖 佗 佘 余 (also SC/JP form of 餘 ->食) 佚 佛 作 佝 佞 佟 你 佡 佢 佣 佤 佥^{SC} (=僉) 佦 佧 佨 来^{SC/JP} (=來)
+6	佩 佪 佫 佬 佭 佮 佯 佰 佱 佲 佳 佴 併 佶 佷 佸 佹 佺 佻 佼 佽 佾 使 侀 侁 侂 侃 侄 侅 來 侇 侈 侉 侊 例 侌 侍 侎 侏 侐 侑 侒 侓 侔 侕 侖 侗 侘 侙 侚 供 侜 依 侞 侟 侠^{SC/JP} (=俠) 価^{JP} (=價) 侢 侣^{SC} (=侶) 侤 侥^{SC} (=僥) 侦^{SC} (=偵) 侧^{SC} (=側) 侨^{SC} (=僑) 侩^{SC} (=儈) 侪^{SC} (=儕) 侫 侬^{SC} (=儂) 侭^{JP} (=儘)
+7	侮 侯 侰 侱 侲 侳 侴 侵 侶 侷 侸 侹 侺 侻^{SC}/侻^{TC/JP} 侼 侽 侾 便 俀 俁 係 促 俄 俅 俆 俇 俈 俉 俊 俋 俌 俍 俎 俏 俐 俑 俒 俓 俔 俕 俖 俗 俘 俙 俚 俛 俜 保 俞 (=兪^{Kangxi} -> 入) 俟 俠 信 俢 俣 俤 俥 俦^{SC} (=儔) 俧 俨^{SC} (=儼) 俩^{SC} (=倆) 俪^{SC} (=儷) 俫^{SC} (=倈) 俬 俭^{SC} (=儉)
+8	修 俯 俰 俱 俲 (=傚) 俳 俴 俵 俶 俷 俸 俹 俺 俻 (=備) 俼 俽 俾 俿 倀 倁 倂 (=併) 倃 倄 倅 倆 倇 倈 倉 倊 個 倌 倍 倎 倏 們 倒 倓 倔 倕 倖 倗 倘 候 倚 倛 倜 倝 倞 借 倠 倡 倢 倣 値^{JP/KO variant} 倥 倦 倧 倨 倩 倪 倫 倬 倭 倮 倯 倰 倱 倲 倳 倴 倵 倶^{JP} (=俱) 倷 倸 倹^{JP} (=儉) 债^{SC} (=債) 倽 倾^{SC} (=傾) 倿
+9	倻 值^{SC/TC variant} 偀 偁 偂 偃 偄 偅 偆 假 偈 偉 偊 偋 偌 偍 偎 偏 偐 偑 偒 偓 偔 偕 偖 偗 偘 偙 做 偛 停 偝 偞 偟 偠 偡 偢 偣 偤 健 偦 偧 偨 偩 偪 偫 偬 偭 偮 偯 偰 偱 偲 偳 側 偵 偶 偷 偸 (=偷) 偹 偺 偻^{SC} (=僂) 偼 (=倢) 偽 偾^{SC} (=僨) 偿^{SC} (=償) 傞^{SC variant}
+10	傀 傁 傂 傃 傄 傅 傆 傇 傈 傉 傊 傋 傌 傍 傎 傏 傐 傑 傒 傓 傔 傕 傖 傗 傘 備 傚 傛 傜^{SC}/傜^{TC} 傝 傞^{TC variant} 傟 傠 傡 (=並 -> 一) 傢 傣 傤^{SC} (=儎) 傥^{SC} (=儻) 傦 傧^{SC} (=儐) 储^{SC} (=儲) 傩^{SC} (=儺)
+11	傪 傫 催 傭 傮 傯 傰 傱 傲 傳 傴 債 傶 傷 傸 傹 傺 傻 傼 傽 傾 傿 僀 僁 僂 僃 僄 僅 僆 僇 僈 僉 僊 僋 僌 働 僙^{SC variant}
+12	僎 像 僐 僑 僒 僓 僔 僕 僖 僗 僘 僙^{TC variant} 僚 僛 僜 僝 僞^{Kangxi} (=偽) 僟 僠 僡 僢 僣 僤 僥 僦 僧 僨 僩 僪 僫 僬 僭 僮 僯 僰 僱 僲 僳 僴
+13	僵 僶 僷 僸 價 僺 僻 僼 僽 僾 僿 儀 儁 儂 儃 億 儅 儆 儇 儈 儉 儊 儋 儌 儍 儎 儏 儰
+14	儐 儑 儒 儓 儔 儕 儖 儗 儘 儙 儚 儛 儜 儝 儞 (=你) 儫 儣^{GB TC variant}
+15	償 儠 儡 儢 儣^{TC variant} 儤 儥 儦 儧 儨 儩 優 儬
+16	儭 儮 儯 儱 儲
+17	儳 儴 儵
+18	儶
+19	儷 儸 儹 儺
+20	儻 儼
+21	儽
+22	儾

== Sinogram ==
As an independent sinogram 人 is a Chinese character. It is one of the kyōiku kanji or kanji taught in elementary school in Japan. It is a first grade kanji.

== Literature ==
- Fazzioli, Edoardo (1987). Chinese calligraphy: from pictograph to ideogram: the history of 214 essential Chinese/Japanese characters. calligraphy by Rebecca Hon Ko. New York: Abbeville Press. ISBN 0-89659-774-1.
- Leyi Li: "Tracing the Roots of Chinese Characters: 500 Cases". Beijing 1993, ISBN 978-7-5619-0204-2
