= Radical 212 =

Chinese character radical

龍
- Radical 212 (U+2FD3)
- 龍 (U+9F8D) "dragon"

Pronunciations
- Pinyin: lóng
- Bopomofo: ㄌㄨㄥˊ
- Wade–Giles: lung2
- Cantonese Yale: lung4
- Jyutping: lung4
- Japanese Kana: リョー ・リュー ryō, ryū たつ tatsu
- Sino-Korean: 룡 ryong

Names
- Japanese name(s): 竜 ryū
- Hangul: 용 yong

Stroke order animation

Radical 212, 龍, 龙, or 竜 meaning "dragon" (龍部), is one of the two 214 Kangxi radicals that are composed of 16 strokes. The character arose as a stylized drawing of a Chinese dragon, (Note: 龍: bottom left: jaws (open downwards); top left: back of head; right side: body and legs; right bottommost stroke: tail) and refers to a version of the dragon in each East Asian culture:

- Chinese dragon, Lóng in Chinese
- Japanese dragon, Ryū or Tatsu in Japanese
- Korean dragon, Ryong or Yong in Korean
- Vietnamese dragon, Rồng in Vietnamese or Long in Sino-Vietnamese

It may also refer to the Dragon as it appears in the Chinese zodiac. It is also a common surname.

In the Kangxi Dictionary 14 characters (out of 40,000) are under this radical.

It occurs as a phonetic complement in some fairly common Chinese characters, for example 聾 = "deaf", which is composed of 龍 "dragon" and the "ear" 耳 radical, "a word with meaning related to ears and pronounced similarly to 龍: "dragon gives sound, ear gives meaning".

== Evolution ==
Shang dynasty Oracle bone script

Shang dynasty Bronze script

Western Zhou oracle script

Western Zhou Bronze script

Spring and Autumn period bronze script

Warring States period bronze script

Chu slip and silk script

Qin slip script

Large seal script character

Small seal script character

Han dynasty Clerical script

Qing dynasty Clerical script

== Characters with Radical 212 ==
strokes	character
+0	龍
+2	龎
+3	龏 龐
+4	龑
+5	龒
+6	龓 龔 龕
+16	龖
+17	龗
+32	龘
+48	𪚥

== Literature ==
- Fazzioli, Edoardo (1987). Chinese calligraphy : from pictograph to ideogram : the history of 214 essential Chinese/Japanese characters. calligraphy by Rebecca Hon Ko. New York: Abbeville Press. ISBN 0-89659-774-1.
- Leyi Li: "Tracing the Roots of Chinese Characters: 500 Cases". Beijing 1993, ISBN 978-7-5619-0204-2
