= Radical 146 =

Chinese character radical

襾
- Radical 146 (U+2F91)
- 襾 (U+897E) "cover, west"

Pronunciations
- Pinyin: yà
- Bopomofo: ㄧㄚˋ
- Wade–Giles: ya4
- Cantonese Yale: ka1, a3
- Jyutping: kaa1, aa3
- Japanese Kana: アカ aka / エケ eke (on'yomi) おおう oou (kun'yomi)
- Sino-Korean: 아 a

Names
- Chinese name(s): 西字頭/西字头 xīzìtóu
- Japanese name(s): 西/にし nishi 覆冠/おおいかんむり ooikanmuri
- Hangul: 덮을 deopeul

Stroke order animation

Stroke order of the component form 覀

Radical 146 or radical west (襾部) meaning "cover" or "west" is one of the 29 Kangxi radicals (214 radicals in total) composed of 6 strokes.

In the Kangxi Dictionary, there are 29 characters (out of 49,030) to be found under this radical.

覀, a variant form of 襾, is the 126th indexing component in the Table of Indexing Chinese Character Components predominantly adopted by Simplified Chinese dictionaries published in mainland China, with 西 listed as its associated indexing component.

== Evolution ==
Large seal script character

Small seal script character

== Derived characters ==
Strokes	Characters
+0	襾 西 覀^{Component}
+3	要
+5	覂
+6	覃 覄 (=覆)
+9	價
+7	覅 (=𧟰)
+12	覆
+13	覇 (=霸 -> 雨) 覈
+17	覉
+19	覊 (=羈 -> 网)

== Literature ==
- Fazzioli, Edoardo (1987). Chinese calligraphy : from pictograph to ideogram : the history of 214 essential Chinese/Japanese characters. calligraphy by Rebecca Hon Ko. New York: Abbeville Press. ISBN 0-89659-774-1.

== See also ==
- Unihan Database - U+897E
