= Radical 70 =

Chinese character radical

方
- Radical 70 (U+2F45)
- 方 (U+65B9) "square"

Pronunciations
- Pinyin: fāng
- Bopomofo: ㄈㄤ
- Gwoyeu Romatzyh: fang
- Wade–Giles: fang^{1}
- Cantonese Yale: fōng
- Jyutping: fong1
- Pe̍h-ōe-jī: hong
- Japanese Kana: ホウ hō (on'yomi) かた kata (kun'yomi)
- Sino-Korean: 방 bang

Names
- Chinese name(s): 方字旁 fāngzìpáng
- Japanese name(s): 方偏/かたへん katahen 方偏/ほうへん hōhen 方/ほう hō
- Hangul: 모 mo

Stroke order animation

Radical 70 or radical square (方部) meaning "square" is one of the 34 Kangxi radicals (214 radicals in total) composed of 4 strokes.

In the Kangxi Dictionary, there are 92 characters (out of 49,030) to be found under this radical.

方 is also the 94th indexing component in the Table of Indexing Chinese Character Components predominantly adopted by Simplified Chinese dictionaries published in mainland China.

== Evolution ==
Unrelated to 万 and 㫃.

Oracle bone script

Bronze script

Chu slip and silk script

Large seal script

Small seal script

=== 㫃 ===
If 㫃 is next to another component, 人 changes to 𠂉 as in 斿 and 旅.

Oracle bone script

Oracle bone script variant

Shang dynasty bronze script

Western Zhou bronze script

Shuowen ancient script

Small seal script

== Derived characters ==
Strokes	Characters
+0	方
+4	斺 斻 於
+5	施 斾 斿 旀
+6	旁 旂 旃 旄 旅 旆 旊
+7	旇 旈 旉 旋 旌 旍 旎 族
+8	旐 旑
+9	旒 旓 旔 旕^{KO}
+10	旖 旗
+12	旘 旙
+13	旚
+14	旛
+15	旜 旝 旞
+16	旟

== Sinogram ==
The radical is also used as an independent Chinese character. It is one of the kyōiku kanji or kanji taught in elementary school in Japan. It is a second grade kanji.

== Literature ==
- Fazzioli, Edoardo (1987). Chinese calligraphy : from pictograph to ideogram : the history of 214 essential Chinese/Japanese characters. calligraphy by Rebecca Hon Ko. New York: Abbeville Press. ISBN 0-89659-774-1.
- Lunde, Ken (Jan 5, 2009). "Appendix J: Japanese Character Sets" (PDF). CJKV Information Processing: Chinese, Japanese, Korean & Vietnamese Computing (Second ed.). Sebastopol, Calif.: O'Reilly Media. ISBN 978-0-596-51447-1.
