= Radical 131 =

Chinese character radical

臣
- Radical 131 (U+2F82)
- 臣 (U+81E3) "minister, official"

Pronunciations
- Pinyin: chén
- Bopomofo: ㄔㄣˊ
- Gwoyeu Romatzyh: chern
- Wade–Giles: chʻên^{2}
- Cantonese Yale: sàhn
- Jyutping: san4
- Japanese Kana: シン shin / ジン jin (on'yomi) おみ omi (kun'yomi)
- Sino-Korean: 신 sin

Names
- Japanese name(s): 臣/しん shin
- Hangul: 신하 sinha

Stroke order animation

Radical 131 or radical minister (臣部) meaning "minister" or "official" is one of the 29 Kangxi radicals (214 radicals in total) composed of 6 strokes.

In the Kangxi Dictionary, there are 16 characters (out of 49,030) to be found under this radical.

臣 is also the 125th indexing component in the Table of Indexing Chinese Character Components predominantly adopted by Simplified Chinese dictionaries published in mainland China.

== Evolution ==
目 ("eye") looking downward.

Oracle bone script character

Chu slip and silk script

Bronze script character

Small seal script character

== Derived characters ==
Strokes	Characters
+0	臣
+2	臤 臥
+6	臦
+8	臧
+11	臨 臩

== Sinogram ==
As an independent sinogram it is a Chinese character. It is one of the kyōiku kanji or kanji taught in elementary school in Japan. It is a fourth grade kanji.
