= 阝 =

Element used in Chinese writing

阝 (Kangxi radical 163 & 170) is a component used in Chinese characters. It serves as the combining form of two distinct radicals, distinguished by whether it is on the left or right of a character. It is the combining form of Radical 170 (阜) when used on the left of a character, as in 阪, and of Radical 163 (邑) when used on the right of a character, as in 部.

In Unicode, ⻖ (U+2ED6) is listed as CJK RADICAL MOUND TWO (meaning 阜 - left) and ⻏ (U+2ECF) is listed as CJK RADICAL CITY (meaning 邑 - right). Most, but not all, fonts render them as almost identical. 阝 (U+961D), listed as CJK UNIFIED IDEOGRAPH-961D, is usually used to represent both.
