= Radical 87 =

Chinese character radical

爪
- Radical 87 (U+2F56)
- 爪 (U+722A) "claw"

Pronunciations
- Pinyin: zhǎo/zhuǎ
- Bopomofo: ㄓㄠˇ/ㄓㄨㄚˇ
- Wade–Giles: chao3/chua3
- Cantonese Yale: jáau
- Jyutping: zaau2
- Pe̍h-ōe-jī: jiáu
- Japanese Kana: ソウ sō (on'yomi) つめ tsume (kun'yomi)
- Sino-Korean: 조 cho

Names
- Chinese name(s): (爫) 爪字頭/爪字头 zhǎozìtóu/zhuǎzìtóu
- Japanese name(s): 爪/つめ tsume 爪繞/そうにょう sōnyō (爫) 爪冠/つめかんむり tsumekanmuri (爫) 爪頭/つめがしら tsumegashira (爫) ノツ冠/のつかんむり notsukanmuri
- Hangul: 손톱 sontop

Stroke order animation

Radical 87 or radical claw (爪部) meaning "claw", "nail" or "talon" is one of the 34 Kangxi radicals (214 radicals total) composed of 4 strokes.

In the Kangxi Dictionary there are 36 characters (out of 49,030) to be found under this radical.

爪 is also the 86th indexing component in the Table of Indexing Chinese Character Components predominantly adopted by Simplified Chinese dictionaries published in mainland China, with 爫 being its associated indexing component.

== Evolution ==
Unrelated to 瓜.

Oracle bone script character

Bronze script character

Large seal script character

Small seal script character

== Derived characters ==
Strokes	Characters
+0	爪 爫^{Component only}
+4	爬 爭
+5	爮 爯 爰
+6	爱^{SC} (=愛 -> 心)
+8	爲
+10	爳
+11	爴
+14	爵

== Variant forms ==
There is a design nuance between the form of 爪 in different typefaces. In mainland China standard, the starting point of the third and fourth strokes of 爪 are joined with the first stroke, while in Taiwan's Standard Form of National Characters, they are detached. This difference may apply to both printing typefaces and handwriting forms, and usually both are acceptable.

Joined	Detached
爪	爪
爬	爬

The upper component form 爫 also has variant forms in different regions. Traditionally, the second and fourth strokes point outwards in printing typefaces (爫) but point inwards in handwriting (爫). In mainland China's xinzixing (new typeface), some 爫 were replaced by ⺈ (a variant form of the radical 刀), e.g. 爭 -> 争, while the others were altered their form to imitate the handwriting form 爫, e.g. 爵 -> 爵; These changes also apply to traditional Chinese characters, e.g. 諍 -> 諍, 爲 -> 爲. Similar change were also adopted in Japanese jōyō kanji (commonly used Chinese characters), e.g. 爵 -> 爵, while the forms of kyūjitai and hyōgai kanji were left unchanged, e.g. 爲 (=為), 爰. In Taiwan, Hong Kong and Macau where Traditional Chinese is used, 爫 is adopted as the standard form, though both forms are commonly used in publication.

Pointing inwards	Pointing outwards
爫	爫
爰	爰
Traditional handwriting Mainland China new typeface Hong Kong & Taiwan standard Japan jōyō kanji	Traditional typefaces Mainland China old typeface Hong Kong & Taiwan old typeface Japan hyōgai kanji Korea

== Literature ==
- Fazzioli, Edoardo (1987). Chinese calligraphy : from pictograph to ideogram : the history of 214 essential Chinese/Japanese characters. calligraphy by Rebecca Hon Ko. New York: Abbeville Press. ISBN 0-89659-774-1.
- Lunde, Ken (Jan 5, 2009). "Appendix J: Japanese Character Sets" (PDF). CJKV Information Processing: Chinese, Japanese, Korean & Vietnamese Computing (Second ed.). Sebastopol, Calif.: O'Reilly Media. ISBN 978-0-596-51447-1.
