= Radical 80 =

Chinese character radical

毋
- Radical 80 (U+2F4F)
- 毋 (U+6BCB) "mother, do not"

Pronunciations
- Pinyin: wú
- Bopomofo: ㄨˊ
- Wade–Giles: wu2
- Cantonese Yale: mòuh
- Jyutping: mou4
- Pe̍h-ōe-jī: bû
- Japanese Kana: ブ bu / ム mu (on'yomi) なかれ nakare (kun'yomi)
- Sino-Korean: 무 mu

Names
- Japanese name(s): なかれ nakare ははのかん hahanokan
- Hangul: 말 mal

Stroke order animation

Radical 80 or radical do not (毋部) meaning "mother" or "do not" is one of the 34 Kangxi radicals (214 radicals in total) composed of 4 strokes. Chinese characters with a similar component 母 "mother" may also be classified under this radical.

In the Kangxi Dictionary, there are 16 characters (out of 49,030) to be found under this radical.

毋 is also the 99th indexing component in the Table of Indexing Chinese Character Components predominantly adopted by Simplified Chinese dictionaries published in mainland China.

In the Hokkien language, 毋 is often used to represent the negation particle [m̩], spelled m̄ in Peh-oe-ji and Tai-lo.

== Evolution ==
=== 毋 ===
Unrelated to 田.

Bronze script

Large seal script

Small seal script

Clerical script Han script

=== 母 ===
女 with two dots.

Oracle bone script

Bronze script

Large seal script

Small seal script

=== 每 (shinjitai:毎) ===
Compound: 屮 + 母

Oracle bone script

Bronze script

Large seal script

Small seal script

== Derived characters ==
| Strokes | Characters |
|---|---|
| +0 | 毋^{SC/TC}/毋^{JP} 毌 |
| +1 | 母 |
| +2 | 毎^{JP} (=每) |
| +3 | 每 毐 |
| +4 | 毑 毒^{TC}/毒^{JP} |
| +9 | 毒^{SC} 毓 |

== Sinogram ==
The radical is also used as an independent Chinese character. It is one of the Kyōiku kanji or Kanji taught in elementary school in Japan. It is a second grade kanji.

== Literature ==
- Fazzioli, Edoardo (1987). Chinese calligraphy : from pictograph to ideogram : the history of 214 essential Chinese/Japanese characters. calligraphy by Rebecca Hon Ko. New York: Abbeville Press. ISBN 0-89659-774-1.
- Lunde, Ken (Jan 5, 2009). "Appendix J: Japanese Character Sets" (PDF). CJKV Information Processing: Chinese, Japanese, Korean & Vietnamese Computing (Second ed.). Sebastopol, Calif.: O'Reilly Media. ISBN 978-0-596-51447-1.
