= Radical 168 =

Chinese character radical

長
- Radical 168 (U+2FA7)
- 長 (U+9577) "long, grow"

Pronunciations
- Pinyin: cháng
- Bopomofo: ㄔㄤˊ
- Wade–Giles: ch'ang2
- Cantonese Yale: cheung4, jeung2
- Jyutping: coeng4, zoeng2
- Japanese Kana: チョウ chō / ジョウ jō (on'yomi) なが-い naga-i (kun'yomi)
- Sino-Korean: 장 jang
- Hán-Việt: trường, trưởng, tràng

Names
- Japanese name(s): 長い/ながい nagai
- Hangul: 길 gil

Stroke order animation

Stroke order of the simplified form 长

Radical 168 or radical long (長部) meaning "long" or "grow" is one of the 9 Kangxi radicals (214 radicals in total) composed of 8 strokes.

In the Kangxi Dictionary, there are 55 characters (out of 49,030) to be found under this radical.

长, the simplified form of 長, is the 83rd indexing component in the Table of Indexing Chinese Character Components predominantly adopted by Simplified Chinese dictionaries published in mainland China, with a variant form 镸 and the traditional form 長 listed as its associated indexing components.

== Evolution ==
Oracle bone script character

Shang dynasty Bronze script

Western Zhou Bronze script

Small seal script character

== Derived characters ==
Strokes	Characters
+0	長 镸 长^{SC} (=長)
+3	镹
+4	镺
+5	镻
+8	镼
+12	镽
+14	镾

== Sinogram ==
As an independent sinogram 長 is one of the kyōiku kanji or kanji taught in elementary school in Japan. It is taught in second grade.
