= Radical 83 =

Chinese character radical

氏
- Radical 83 (U+2F52)
- 氏 (U+6C0F) "clan"

Pronunciations
- Pinyin: shì
- Bopomofo: ㄕˋ
- Wade–Giles: shih4
- Cantonese Yale: sih, jī
- Jyutping: si6, zi1
- Pe̍h-ōe-jī: sī
- Japanese Kana: シ shi (on'yomi) うじ uji (kun'yomi)
- Sino-Korean: 씨 ssi

Names
- Japanese name(s): 氏/うじ uji
- Hangul: 성 seong

Stroke order animation

Radical 83 or radical clan (氏部) meaning "clan" is one of the 34 Kangxi radicals (214 radicals in total) composed of 4 strokes.

In the Kangxi Dictionary, there are 10 characters (out of 49,030) to be found under this radical.

氏 is also the 89th indexing component in the Table of Indexing Chinese Character Components predominantly adopted by Simplified Chinese dictionaries published in mainland China.

== Evolution ==
=== 氏 ===
Oracle bone script

Bronze script

Chu slip and silk script

Large seal script

Small seal script

=== 民 ===
An eye (目) with an object.

Oracle bone script

Bronze script

Large seal script

Small seal script

== Derived characters ==
Strokes	Characters
+0	氏
+1	氐 民
+2	氒
+4	氓

== Sinogram ==
As an independent Chinese character. It is one of the kyōiku kanji or kanji taught in elementary school in Japan. It is a fourth grade kanji.

- In Japanese it refers to Japanese clans or uji.
  - It also refers to Ujigami (氏神) which are gods originally limited to clans which are now worshipped by everyone in a region.
- In Chinese it refers to Chinese clan surnames. Historically Chinese surnames had two levels with the higher level xing (Chinese: 姓; pinyin: xìng) shared by many people and the lower level shi (Chinese: 氏; pinyin: shì) which was frequently changed. Similar to Roman nomen and Cognomen

== Literature ==
- Fazzioli, Edoardo (1987). Chinese calligraphy : from pictograph to ideogram : the history of 214 essential Chinese/Japanese characters. calligraphy by Rebecca Hon Ko. New York: Abbeville Press. ISBN 0-89659-774-1.
- Lunde, Ken (Jan 5, 2009). "Appendix J: Japanese Character Sets" (PDF). CJKV Information Processing: Chinese, Japanese, Korean & Vietnamese Computing (Second ed.). Sebastopol, Calif.: O'Reilly Media. ISBN 978-0-596-51447-1.
