= Radical 210 =

Chinese character radical

齊
- Radical 210 (U+2FD1)
- 齊 (U+9F4A) "even, uniformly"

Pronunciations
- Pinyin: qí
- Bopomofo: ㄑㄧˊ
- Wade–Giles: ch'i2
- Cantonese Yale: cai4
- Jyutping: cai4
- Japanese Kana: セイ, サイ sei, sai そろう sorō
- Sino-Korean: 제 jae
- Hán-Việt: tày

Names
- Japanese name(s): 斉 sei
- Hangul: 가지런할 gajireonhal

Stroke order animation

Radical 210 meaning "even" or "uniformly" (齊部) is 1 of 2 Kangxi radicals (214 radicals total) composed of 14 strokes.

In the Kangxi Dictionary there are 18 characters (out of 49,030) to be found under this radical.

== Evolution ==
Shang dynasty Oracle bone script

Shang dynasty Bronze script

Western Zhou Bronze script

Qin slip script

Small seal script character

== Characters with Radical 210 ==
strokes	character
+0	齊 斉 齐
+3	斎 齋
+4	齌
+5	齍
+7	齎
+9	齏

== Literature ==
- Fazzioli, Edoardo (1987). Chinese calligraphy : from pictograph to ideogram : the history of 214 essential Chinese/Japanese characters. calligraphy by Rebecca Hon Ko. New York: Abbeville Press. ISBN 0-89659-774-1.
- Lunde, Ken (Jan 5, 2009). "Appendix J: Japanese Character Sets" (PDF). CJKV Information Processing: Chinese, Japanese, Korean & Vietnamese Computing (Second ed.). Sebastopol, Calif.: O'Reilly Media. ISBN 978-0-596-51447-1.
