= Radical 180 =

Chinese character radical

音
- Radical 180 (U+2FB3)
- 音 (U+97F3) "sound"

Pronunciations
- Pinyin: yīn
- Bopomofo: ㄧㄣ
- Wade–Giles: yin1
- Cantonese Yale: yam1
- Jyutping: jam1
- Japanese Kana: オン on / イン in (on'yomi) おと oto / ね ne (kun'yomi)
- Sino-Korean: 음 eum
- Hán-Việt: âm, ậm, ơm

Names
- Japanese name(s): 音/おと oto 音偏/おとへん otohen
- Hangul: 소리 sori

Stroke order animation

Radical 180 or radical sound (音部) meaning "sound" is one of the 11 Kangxi radicals (214 radicals in total) composed of 9 strokes.

In the Kangxi Dictionary, there are 43 characters (out of 49,030) to be found under this radical.

音 is also the 186th indexing component in the Table of Indexing Chinese Character Components predominantly adopted by Simplified Chinese dictionaries published in mainland China.

== Evolution ==
The character 音 is based on 言 with a stroke in mouth (口)

Western Zhou Bronze script

Spring and Autumn period bronze script

Chu slip and silk script

Qin slip script

Large seal script character

Small seal script character

== Derived characters ==
Strokes	Characters
+0	音
+2	竟 章
+4	韴 韵^{SC} (=韻)
+5	韶 韷
+7	韸
+8	韺^{SC}
+9	韹 韺^{TC}
+10	韻 韼^{SC}
+11	韼^{TC}韽 韾 響^{JP}/響^{GB TC}
+12	響^{TC}
+13	頀^{SC}
+14	頀^{TC}

== Sinogram ==
The radical is also used as an independent Chinese character. It is one of the kyōiku kanji or kanji taught in elementary school in Japan. It is a first grade kanji.

== Literature ==
- Fazzioli, Edoardo (1987). Chinese calligraphy : from pictograph to ideogram : the history of 214 essential Chinese/Japanese characters. calligraphy by Rebecca Hon Ko. New York: Abbeville Press. ISBN 0-89659-774-1.
