= Radical 160 =

Chinese character radical

辛
- Radical 160 (U+2F9F)
- 辛 (U+8F9B) "bitter"

Pronunciations
- Pinyin: xīn
- Bopomofo: ㄒㄧㄣ
- Wade–Giles: hsin1
- Cantonese Yale: san1
- Jyutping: san1
- Japanese Kana: シン shin (on'yomi) から-い kara-i / つら-い tsura-i (kun'yomi)
- Sino-Korean: 신 sin
- Hán-Việt: tân

Names
- Chinese name(s): (Side) 辛字旁 xīnzìpáng (Bottom) 辛字底 xīnzìdǐ
- Japanese name(s): 辛/からい karai
- Hangul: 매울 maeul

Stroke order animation

Radical 160 or radical bitter (辛部) meaning "bitter" is one of the 20 Kangxi radicals (214 radicals in total) composed of 7 strokes.

In the Kangxi Dictionary, there are 36 characters (out of 49,030) to be found under this radical.

In the ancient Chinese cyclic character numeral system tiāngān, 辛 represents the eighth Celestial stem.

辛 is also the 167th indexing component in the Table of Indexing Chinese Character Components predominantly adopted by Simplified Chinese dictionaries published in mainland China.

== Evolution ==
Pictogram of a tool used to mark slaves and criminals.

Oracle bone script character

Shang dynasty Bronze script

Western Zhou Bronze script

Spring and Autumn period Bronze script

Small seal script character

== Derived characters ==
Strokes	Characters
+0	辛
+5	辜 辝 (=辭)
+6	辞^{SC/JP} (=辭) 辟 (also SC form of 闢 -> 門) 辠 (=罪 -> 网)
+7	辡 (=辯) 辢 (=辣) 辣
+8	辤 (=辭)
+9	辥 辦 辧 (=辨) 辨 辩^{SC} (=辯) 辪
+10	辫^{SC} (=辮)
+11	辬 (=斑 -> 文)
+12	辭
+13	辮
+14	辯

== Literature ==
- Fazzioli, Edoardo (1987). Chinese calligraphy : from pictograph to ideogram : the history of 214 essential Chinese/Japanese characters. calligraphy by Rebecca Hon Ko. New York: Abbeville Press. ISBN 0-89659-774-1.
- Lunde, Ken (Jan 5, 2009). "Appendix J: Japanese Character Sets" (PDF). CJKV Information Processing: Chinese, Japanese, Korean & Vietnamese Computing (Second ed.). Sebastopol, Calif.: O'Reilly Media. ISBN 978-0-596-51447-1.
