= Radical 49 =

Chinese character radical

己
- Radical 49 (U+2F30)
- 己 (U+5DF1) "oneself"

Pronunciations
- Pinyin: jǐ
- Bopomofo: ㄐㄧˇ
- Wade–Giles: chi3
- Cantonese Yale: géi
- Jyutping: gei2
- Pe̍h-ōe-jī: kí
- Japanese Kana: キ ki / コ ko (on'yomi) おのれ onore / つちのと tsuchinoto (kun'yomi)
- Sino-Korean: 기 gi

Names
- Japanese name(s): 己/おのれ onore
- Hangul: 몸 mom

Stroke order animation

Radical 49 or radical oneself (己部) meaning "oneself" is one of the 31 Kangxi radicals (214 radicals total) composed of three strokes.

In the Kangxi Dictionary, there are 20 characters (out of 49,030) to be found under this radical.

己 is also the 52nd indexing component in the Table of Indexing Chinese Character Components predominantly adopted by Simplified Chinese dictionaries published in mainland China. Two associated indexing components, 已 and 巳 are affiliated to the principal indexing component 己.

In Chinese astrology, 巳 represents the sixth Earthly Branch and corresponds to the Snake in the Chinese zodiac. In the ancient Chinese cyclic character numeral system tiāngān, 己 represents the sixth Celestial stem.

== Evolution ==
=== 己 (oneself; 6th heavenly stem) ===
Oracle bone script character

Bronze script character

Chu slip and silk script

Large seal script character

Small seal script character

=== 已 (already) ===
Bronze script character

Chu slip and silk script

=== 巳 (6th earthly branch) ===
Oracle bone script character

Bronze script character

Large seal script character

Small seal script character

=== 巴 ===
Oracle bone script character

Large seal script character

Small seal script character

== Derived characters ==
Strokes	Characters
+0	己 (oneself) 已 (already) 巳 (6th Celestial stem)
+1	巴
+4	巵
+5	巶
+6	巷 巸 巹 巺 (=巽) 巻^{JP} (=卷 -> 卩)
+7	巼^{KO}
+9	巽

== Sinogram ==
The radical is also used as an independent Chinese character. It is one of the Kyōiku kanji or Kanji taught in elementary school in Japan. It is a fifth grade kanji.

== Literature ==
- Fazzioli, Edoardo (1987). Chinese calligraphy : from pictograph to ideogram : the history of 214 essential Chinese/Japanese characters. calligraphy by Rebecca Hon Ko. New York: Abbeville Press. ISBN 0-89659-774-1.
- Lunde, Ken (Jan 5, 2009). "Appendix J: Japanese Character Sets" (PDF). CJKV Information Processing: Chinese, Japanese, Korean & Vietnamese Computing (Second ed.). Sebastopol, Calif.: O'Reilly Media. ISBN 978-0-596-51447-1.
