= Radical 5 =

Kangxi radical

乙
- Radical 5 (U+2F04)
- 乙 (U+4E59) "second, fishing hook"

Pronunciations
- Pinyin: yǐ
- Bopomofo: 一ˇ
- Gwoyeu Romatzyh: yii
- Wade–Giles: i^{3}
- Cantonese Yale: yut
- Jyutping: jyut3
- Pe̍h-ōe-jī: it
- Japanese Kana: オツ otsu (on'yomi) きのと kinoto /おと oto (kun'yomi)
- Sino-Korean: 을 eul
- Hán-Việt: ất

Names
- Japanese name(s): 乙 otsu 乙繞/おつにょう otsunyoū 釣り針/つりばり tsuribari (fishing hook)
- Hangul: 새 sae

Stroke order animation

Radical 5 or radical second (乙部), meaning "second", is one of 6 of the 214 Kangxi radicals that are composed of only one stroke. However, this radical is mainly used to categorize miscellaneous characters otherwise not belonging to any radical, mainly featuring a hook or fold, and 乙 is the character with the fewest strokes.

In the ancient Chinese cyclic character numeral system, 乙 represents the second Celestial stem (天干 tiāngān).

In the Kangxi Dictionary, there are 42 characters (out of 49,030) to be found under this radical.

In mainland China, 乙 along with other 14 associated indexing components, including 乚, etc., are affiliated to a new radical 乛 (乛部), which is the 5th principal indexing component in the Table of Indexing Chinese Character Components predominantly adopted by Simplified Chinese dictionaries. Usually, only several out of the 15 variant components are listed under radical 乛 in dictionary indexes.

== Evolution ==
Oracle bone script character

Bronze script character

Large seal script character

Small seal script character

== Derived characters ==
| Strokes | Characters |
|---|---|
| +0 | 乙 乚 乛^{Component only} |
| +1 | 乜 九 |
| +2 | 乞 也 习^{SC} (=習 -> 羽) |
| +3 | 乢 乣 乤^{KO} 乥^{KO} |
| +4 | 乧^{KO} |
| +5 | 乨 乩 乪 乫^{KO} 乬^{KO} 乭^{KO} 乮^{KO} 乯^{KO} |
| +6 | 乱 (SC/JP, =亂) 乲^{KO} |
| +7 | 乳 乴^{KO} 乵^{KO} 乶^{KO} 乷^{KO} 乸 |
| +8 | 乹 乺^{KO} 乻^{KO} 乼^{KO} 乽^{KO} |
| +10 | 乾 乿 亀^{JP} (=龜 -> 龜) |
| +11 | 亁 (=乾) |
| +12 | 亂 亃 亄 |

In the Unihan database, 亀 (Japanese simplified form of 龜) falls under Radical 5 + 10 strokes, while other variants of 龜 (including Simplified Chinese 龟) fall under Radical 213 (龜 "turtle"), causing an inconsistency. However, in most Japanese dictionaries, 亀 is treated as a variant of Radical 213 (龜) and indexed Radical 213 + 0 strokes.

== Sinogram ==
As an independent character, it is a Jōyō kanji, or a kanji that is frequently used in writing the Japanese language. It is a secondary school kanji. It is also used in the Chinese language.

It means "secondary" and is mainly used in compounds.

== See also ==
- List of jōyō kanji
