= Radical 151 =

Chinese character radical

豆
- Radical 151 (U+2F96)
- 豆 (U+8C46) "bean"

Pronunciations
- Pinyin: dòu
- Bopomofo: ㄉㄡˋ
- Wade–Giles: tou4
- Cantonese Yale: dau2, dau6
- Jyutping: dau2, dau6
- Japanese Kana: トウ tō / ズ zu (on'yomi) まめ mame (kun'yomi)
- Sino-Korean: 두 du

Names
- Chinese name(s): 豆字旁 dòuzìpáng
- Japanese name(s): 豆/まめ mame (Left) 豆偏/まめへん mamehen
- Hangul: 콩 kong

Stroke order animation

Radical 151 or radical bean (豆部) meaning "bean" is one of the 214 Kangxi radicals. It is one of 20 which are composed of 7 strokes.

In the Kangxi Dictionary, there are 68 characters (out of 49,030) to be found under this radical.

豆 is also the 152nd indexing component in the Table of Indexing Chinese Character Components predominantly adopted by Simplified Chinese dictionaries published in mainland China.

== Evolution ==
Oracle bone script character

Bronze script character

Large seal script character

Small seal script character

== Derived characters ==
Strokes	Characters
+0	豆
+3	豇 豈
+4	豉
+6	豊^{JP} (=豐) 豋
+8	豌 豍 豎
+10	豏
+11	豐
+13	豑 (=秩 -> 禾)
+18	豒 (=秩 -> 禾)
+20	豓 (=豔)
+21	豔

== Sinogram ==
As an independent sinogram 豆 is one of the Kyōiku kanji or Kanji taught in elementary school in Japan. Specifically it is a third grade kanji.
