= Radical 18 =

Chinese character radical

刀
- Radical 18 (U+2F11)
- 刀 (U+5200) "knife"

Pronunciations
- Pinyin: dāo
- Bopomofo: ㄉㄠ
- Wade–Giles: tao1
- Cantonese Yale: dou1
- Jyutping: dou1
- Pe̍h-ōe-jī: to
- Japanese Kana: トウ tō (on'yomi) かたな katana (kun'yomi)
- Sino-Korean: 도 do
- Hán-Việt: đao

Names
- Japanese name(s): 刀 katana
- Hangul: 칼 kal

Stroke order animation

刂
- Radical 18 (U+2F11)
- 刂 (U+5202) "component-only side form of 刀"

Names
- Chinese name(s): 立刀旁 lìdāopáng
- Japanese name(s): 立刀/りっとう rittō

Stroke order animation

Radical 18 or radical knife (刀部) meaning "knife" is one of 23 Kangxi radicals (214 radicals total) composed of 2 strokes.

When appearing at the right side of a Chinese character, it usually transforms into 刂.

In the Kangxi Dictionary, there are 377 characters (out of 49,030) to be found under this radical.

刀 is also the 22nd indexing component in the Table of Indexing Chinese Character Components predominantly adopted by Simplified Chinese dictionaries published in mainland China. Two associated indexing components, 刂 and ⺈, are affiliated to the principal indexing component 刀.

== Evolution ==
Compare 匕; unrelated to 力.

Shang dynasty oracle bone script

Shang dynasty bronze script

Western Zhou bronze script

Chu slip and silk script

Qin slip script

Large seal script

Small seal script

=== 刃 ===
Shang dynasty oracle bone script

Chu slip and silk script

Large seal script

Small seal script

== Derived characters ==
Strokes	Characters
+0	刀 刁 刂^{component only}
+1	刃^{SC/KO}/刃^{TC}/刃^{JP} 刄 (=刃)
+2	刅 分 切 刈
+3	刉 刊 刋 (=刊) 刌 刍^{SC} (=芻 -> 艸)
+4	刎 刏 刐 刑 划 刓 刔 刕 刖 列 刘^{SC} (=劉) 则^{SC} (=則) 刚^{SC} (=剛) 创^{SC} (=創)
+5	刜 初 刞 刟 删^{SC variant} (=刪) 刡 刢 刣 判 別^{TC/JP variant} 刦 (=劫 -> 力) 刧 (=劫 -> 力) 刨 利 刪^{TC/JP variant} 别^{SC variant} (=別) 刬^{SC} (=剗) 刭^{SC} (=剄)
+6	刮 刯 到 刱 (=創) 刲 刳 刴 (=剁) 刵 制 刷 券 刹^{SC/JP} (=剎) 刺 刻 刼 (=劫 -> 力) 刽^{SC} (=劊) 刾^{SC} (=㓨) 刿^{SC} (=劌) 剀^{SC} (=剴) 剁 剂^{SC} (=劑)
+7	剃 剄 剅 剆 則 剈 剉 削 剋 剌 前 剎 剏 (=創) 剐^{SC} (=剮) 剑^{SC} (=劍)
+8	剒 剓 剔 剕 剖 剗 剘 剙 (=創) 剚 剛 剜 剝 剞 剟 剠 剡 剢 剣^{JP} (=劍) 剤^{JP} (=劑) 剥^{SC/JP} (=剝) 剦 (=閹 -> 門) 剧^{SC} (=劇) 剮^{GB TC variant}
+9	剨 剪 剫 剬 剭 剮^{Traditional variant} 副 剰^{JP} (=剩) 剱^{JP nonstandard} (=劍)
+10	剩 割 剳 剴 創 剶
+11	剷 剸 剹 剺 剻 剼 剽 剾 剿
+12	劀 劁 劂 劃 劄
+13	劅 劆 劇 劈 劉 劊 劋 劌 劍 劎 (=劍) 劏
+14	劐 劑 劒 (=劍) 劓 劔 (=劍)
+15	劕
+17	劖
+19	劗 劘
+21	劙 劚

== Sinogram ==
As an isolated character it is one of the kyōiku kanji or a kanji taught in second grade.

== Literature ==
- Fazzioli, Edoardo (1987). Chinese calligraphy : from pictograph to ideogram : the history of 214 essential Chinese/Japanese characters. calligraphy by Rebecca Hon Ko. New York: Abbeville Press. ISBN 0-89659-774-1.
- Leyi Li: “Tracing the Roots of Chinese Characters: 500 Cases”. Beijing 1993, ISBN 978-7-5619-0204-2
