= Chinese character radicals =

Indexing component of Chinese characters

The radical for the Chinese character 媽 mā ('mother') is the semantic component ⼥ 'WOMAN' on its left side.

A radical (Chinese: 部首; pinyin: bùshǒu; lit. 'section header'), or indexing component, is a visually prominent component of a Chinese character under which the character is traditionally listed in a Chinese dictionary. The radical for a character is typically a semantic component, but it can also be another structural component or an artificially extracted portion of the character. In some cases, the original semantic or phonological connection has become obscure, owing to changes in the meaning or pronunciation of the character over time.

The use of the English term radical is based on an analogy between the structure of Chinese characters and the inflection of words in European languages. (Note: As Léon Wieger explains: The inflected words of European languages are decomposed into radical and termination. The radical gives the meaning; the termination indicates case, time, mood. The first sinologists applied those grammatical terms belonging to inflected languages, to the Chinese language which is not an inflected one.) Radicals are also sometimes called classifiers, but this name is more commonly applied to the grammatical measure words in Chinese.

== History ==
In the earliest Chinese dictionaries, such as the Erya (3rd century BC), characters were grouped together in broad semantic categories. Because the vast majority of characters are phono-semantic compounds, combining a semantic component with a phonetic component, each semantic component tended to recur within a particular section of the dictionary. In the 2nd century AD, the Han dynasty scholar Xu Shen organized his etymological dictionary Shuowen Jiezi by selecting 540 recurring graphic elements he called bù (部; "categories"). Most were common semantic components, but they also included shared graphic elements such as a dot or horizontal stroke. Some were even artificially extracted groups of strokes, termed "glyphs" by Serruys, which never had an independent existence other than being listed in Shuowen. Each character was listed under only one element, which is then referred to as the radical for that character. For example, characters containing 女; nǚ; "female" or 木; mù; "tree, wood" are often grouped together in the sections for those radicals.

Mei Yingzuo's 1615 dictionary Zihui made two further innovations. He reduced the list of radicals to 214 and arranged characters under each radical in increasing order of the number of additional strokes—the radical-and-stroke method still used in the vast majority of present-day Chinese dictionaries. These innovations were also adopted by the more famous Kangxi Dictionary of 1716. Thus the standard 214 radicals introduced in the Zihui are usually known as the Kangxi radicals. These were first called bùshǒu (部首; "section header") in the Kangxi Dictionary. Although there is some variation in such lists – depending primarily on what secondary radicals are also indexed – these canonical 214 radicals of the Kangxi Dictionary still serve as the basis for most modern Chinese dictionaries. Some of the graphically similar radicals are combined in many dictionaries, such as 月; yuè; "moon" and the 月 form (⺼) of 肉; ròu; "meat, flesh".

After the writing system reform in mainland China, the traditional set of Kangxi radicals became unsuitable for indexing Simplified Chinese characters. In 1983, the Committee for Reforming the Chinese Written Language and the State Administration of Publication of China published The Table of Unified Indexing Chinese Character Components (Draft) (汉字统一部首表（草案）). In 2009, the Ministry of Education of the People's Republic of China and the State Language Work Committee issued The Table of Indexing Chinese Character Components (GF 0011-2009 汉字部首表), which includes 201 principal indexing components and 100 associated indexing components. In China's normative documents, "radical" is defined as any component or pianpang (偏旁; piānpáng) of Chinese characters, while bushou is translated as "indexing component".

== Shape and position ==
Radicals may appear in any position in a character. For example, 女 appears on the left side in the characters 姐, 媽, 她, 好 and 姓, but it appears at the bottom in 妾. Semantic components tend to appear on the top or on the left side of the character, and phonetic components on the right side or at the bottom. These are loose rules, however, and exceptions are plenty. Sometimes, the radical may span more than one side, as in 園 = 囗; "enclosure" + 袁, or 街 = 行; "go, movement" + 圭. More complicated combinations exist, such as 勝 = 力; "strength" + 朕—the radical is in the lower-right quadrant.

In many characters, the components (including radicals) are distorted or modified to fit into a block with other elements. They may be narrowed, shortened, or have different shapes entirely. Changes in shape, rather than simple distortion, may result in fewer strokes. In some cases, combinations may have alternates. The shape of the component can depend on its placement with other elements in the character.

The shape 阝 is indexed as two different radicals depending on where it appears in the character. Placed on the right, as in du (都; dū; "metropolis") (also read as dōu; "all"), it represents an abbreviated form of yi (邑; yì; "city"). Placed on the left, as in lu (陸; lù; "land"), it represents an abbreviated radical form of fu (阜; fù; "mound, hill").

Some of the most important variant combining forms (besides 邑 → 阝 and 阜 → 阝per the above) are:

- 刀; "knife" → 刂 when placed to the right of other elements:
  - examples: 分, 召 ~ 刖
  - counter-example: 切
- 人; "man" → 亻 on the left:
  - 囚, 仄, 坐 ~ 他
  - counter-example: 从
- 心; "heart" → 忄 on the left:
  - 杺, 您, 恭* ~ 快

(*) 心 occasionally becomes ⺗ when written at the foot of a character.

- 手; "hand" → 扌 on the left:
  - 杽, 拏, 掱 ~ 扡
  - counter-example: 拜
- 水; "water" → 氵 on the left:
  - 汆, 呇, 沊 ~ 池
  - counter-example: 沝
- 火; "fire" → 灬 at the bottom:
  - 伙, 秋, 灱 ~ 黑
  - counter-example: 災
- 犬; "dog" → 犭 on the left:
  - 伏, 状 ~ 狙
  - counter-example: 㹜

=== Semantic components ===
Over 80% of Chinese characters are phono-semantic compounds (形聲字): a semantic component gives a broad category of meaning, while a phonetic component suggests the sound. Usually, the radical is the semantic component.

Thus, although some authors use the term radical for semantic components (義符; yìfú), (Note: Wieger uses the terms "keys of the dictionary" and "the 214 keys of K'ang-hsi" for 部首; bùshǒu, reserving the term "radical" for any element bearing meaning.) others distinguish the latter as determinatives or significs or by some other term. (Note: Woon gives an extensive list of the translations of 義符; yìfú: semantic element, radical, determinative, signific, signifying part, significant, significant part, semantic part, meaning element, meaning part, sense-indicator, radical-determinative, lexical morpheme symbol, ideographic element, and logographic part. Among them, "radical" and "ideographic" have both been strenuously objected to as misleading.) (Note: Professor Woon Wee Lee (1987) also explains: It is important to note that the concepts of semantic element and "section heading" (部首; bùshǒu) are different, and should be clearly distinguished. The semantic element is parallel to the phonetic element in terms of the phonetic compound, while the section heading is a terminology of Chinese lexicography, which is a generic heading for the characters arranged in each section of a dictionary according to the system established by Xu Shen. It is the "head" of a section, assigned for convenience only. Thus, a section heading is usually the element common to all characters belonging to the same section. (Cf. L. Wang, 1962:1.151). The semantic elements of phonetic compounds were usually also used as section headings. However, characters in the same section are not necessarily all phonetic compounds. ...In some sections, such as 品 pin3 "the masses" (S. Xu 1963:48) and 爪 zhua3 "a hand" (S. Xu 1963:63), no phonetic compound is incorporated. In other words, the section heading was not commonly used as a semantic element...To sum up, the selection of a section heading is to some extent arbitrary.) (Note: When an etymon (original "root" form of a graph, such as 采; cǎi; "to pick", in 採; cǎi; "to pick") is analyzed alongside the remaining element(s), it cannot be said to be playing only a phonetic role. For instance, operating under the two misconceptions that a) all characters have exactly one semantic and one phonetic part, and b) each part can only play one role, many would mistakenly dissect 採 as comprising 扌; shǒu semantic and 采; cǎi phonetic. However, being the original graph, it must necessarily impart its original semantic meaning (showing as it does a hand picking from a tree) as well as its sound. In the case of 陷; xiàn "pit trap; fall into", for instance, Duan Yucai notes in his annotation of the Shuowen Jiezi that the Dà Xú 大徐 edition acknowledges that 臽 plays the dual roles of phonetic and semantic in 陷, stating "从阝, 从臽, 臽 亦聲".)

Many radicals are artificial extractions of portions of characters, some of which are further changed when applied (such as 亅; jué, juě in 了; liǎo), as explained by Serruys (1984), who therefore prefers the term "glyph" extraction rather than graphic extraction. This is even truer of modern dictionaries, which cut radicals to less than half the number in Shuowen, at which point it becomes impossible to have enough to cover a semantic element of every character. A sample of the Far Eastern Chinese English Dictionary of mere artificial extraction of a stroke from sub-entries:

- 一; yī in 丁; dīng and 且; qiě
- 乙; yǐ in 九; jiǔ
- 亅; jué/juě in 了; liǎo/le
- 二; èr in 亞; yà/yǎ
- 田; tián in 禺; yù
- 豕; shǐ in 象; xiàng.

=== Phonetic components ===
Radicals sometimes play a phonetic role instead of a semantic one:

| Phonetic part | pinyin | meaning | Character | pinyin | meaning |
|---|---|---|---|---|---|
| 臼 | jiù | "a mortar" | 舅 | jiù | "maternal uncle" |
| 臼 | jiù | "a mortar" | 舊 | jiù | "owl; old" |
| 虎 | hǔ | "tiger" | 虖 | hū | "shout" |
| 鬼 | guǐ | (originally "helmet"), now "ghost" | 魁 | kúi | "leader" |
| 鹿 | lù | "deer" | 麓 | lù | foothills |
| 麻 | má | "hemp" | 麼 | ma, mó | "tiny" |
| 黃 | huáng | "yellow" | 黌 | hóng | "a school" |
| 羽 | yǔ | "feather" | 翌 | yì | "next" |
| 齊 | qí | "orderly" | 齎 | jī | "to present" |
| 青 | qīng | "verdant" or "youth" | 靖 | jìng | "peaceful" |
| 青 | qīng | "verdant" or "youth" | 靚 | jìng | "to ornament; quiet" |
| 青 | qīng | "verdant" or "youth" | 靜 | jìng | "quiet" |

In some cases, radicals chosen for their phonetic sense also have a coincidental semantic association.

=== Simplified radicals ===
The character simplification pursued in the People's Republic of China and elsewhere has modified a number of components, including those used as radicals. This has created a number of new radical forms. For instance, the character 金; jīn, when used as a radical, is written 釒(that is, with the same number of strokes, and only a minor variation) in traditional writing, but 钅in simplified characters. This means that simplified writing has resulted in significant differences not present in traditional writing. An example of a character using this radical is simplified Chinese: 银; traditional Chinese: 銀; pinyin: yín; trans. "silver".

== Dictionary lookup ==
Many dictionaries support using radical classification to index and look up characters, although many present-day dictionaries supplement it with other methods. For example, modern dictionaries in PRC normally use the Pinyin transcription of a character to perform character lookup. Following the "section-header-and-stroke-count" method of Mei Yingzuo, characters are listed by their radical and then ordered by the number of strokes needed to write them.

The steps involved in looking up a character are as follows:

1. Identify the radical under which the character is most likely to have been indexed. If in doubt, the component on the left side or at the top is often a good first guess.
2. Find the section of the dictionary associated with that radical.
3. Count the number of strokes in the remaining portion of the character.
4. Find the pages listing characters under that radical that have that number of additional strokes.
5. Find the appropriate entry or experiment with different choices for steps 1 and 3.

As a rule of thumb, components at the left or top of the character, or elements which surround the rest of the character, are the ones most likely to be used as radical. For example, 信 is typically indexed under the left-side component 人 instead of the right-side 言; and 套 is typically indexed under the top 大 instead of the bottom 長. There are, however, idiosyncratic differences between dictionaries, and except for simple cases, the same character cannot be assumed to be indexed the same way in two different dictionaries.

In order to further ease dictionary lookup, dictionaries sometimes list radicals both under the number of strokes used to write their canonical form and under the number of strokes used to write their variant forms. For example, 心 can be listed as a four-stroke radical but might also be listed as a three-stroke radical because it is usually written as 忄 when it forms a part of another character. This means that the dictionary user need not know that the two are etymologically identical.

It is sometimes possible to find one and the same character indexed under multiple radicals. For example, many dictionaries list 義 under both 羊 and ⼽ 'HALBERD' (the radical of its lower part 我). Furthermore, with digital dictionaries, it is now possible to search for characters by cross-reference. Using this "multi-component method", a relatively new development enabled by computing technology, the user can select all of a character's components from a table and the computer will present a list of matching characters. This eliminates the guesswork of choosing the correct radical and calculating the correct stroke count and cuts down searching time. One can query for characters containing both 羊 and 戈 and get back only five characters (羢, 義, 儀, 羬 and 羲) to search through. The Academia Sinica's 漢字構形資料庫 Chinese character structure database also works this way, returning only seven characters for this query. Harbaugh's Chinese Characters dictionary similarly allows searches based on any component. Some modern computer dictionaries allow the user to draw characters with a mouse, stylus or finger, ideally tolerating a degree of imperfection, thus eliminating the problem of radical identification altogether.

=== Sets of radicals ===
Though radicals are widely accepted as a method to categorize Chinese characters and locate a certain character in a dictionary, there is no universal agreement about either the exact number of radicals or the set of radicals to be used, due to the sometimes arbitrary nature of the selection process.

The Kangxi radicals are a de facto standard which, although not implemented exactly in every Chinese dictionary, few dictionary compilers can afford to completely ignore. They serve as the basis for many computer encoding systems. Specifically, the Unicode standard's radical-stroke charts are based on the Kangxi set of radicals.

The count of commonly used radicals in modern abridged dictionaries is often less than 214. The Oxford Concise English–Chinese Dictionary has 188. A few dictionaries also introduce new radicals based on the principles first used by Xu Shen, treating groups of radicals that are used together in many different characters as a kind of radical.

In modern practice, radicals are primarily used as lexicographic tools and as learning aids when writing characters. They have become increasingly disconnected from semantics, etymology and phonetics.

=== Limitations and flexibility ===
Some of the radicals used in Chinese dictionaries, even in the era of Kangxi, were not stand-alone current-usage characters. Instead, they indexed unique characters that lacked more obvious qualifiers. The radical 鬯 (chàng; "sacrificial wine") indexes only a few characters. Modern dictionaries tend to eliminate these when it is possible to find some more widely used graphic element under which a character can be categorized. Some use a system where characters are indexed under more than one radical and/or set of key elements to make it easier to find them.

== See also ==
- List of radicals in Unicode
- Chinese character description languages
- Chinese character orders
- List of kanji radicals by stroke count
- List of kanji radicals by frequency
- Stroke-based sorting
