= Radical 59 =

Chinese character radical

彡
- Radical 59 (U+2F3A)
- 彡 (U+5F61) "bristle, beard"

Pronunciations
- Pinyin: shān
- Bopomofo: ㄕㄢ
- Gwoyeu Romatzyh: shan
- Wade–Giles: shan^{1}
- Cantonese Yale: sāam
- Jyutping: saam1
- Pe̍h-ōe-jī: sam
- Japanese Kana: サン san (on'yomi)
- Sino-Korean: 삼 sam

Names
- Chinese name(s): 三撇 sānpiě
- Japanese name(s): 彡旁/さんづくり sanzukuri 髪飾り/かみかざり kamikazari
- Hangul: 터럭 teoreok

Stroke order animation

Radical 59 or radical bristle (彡部) meaning "bristle" or "beard" is one of the 31 Kangxi radicals (214 radicals in total) composed of three strokes.

In the Kangxi Dictionary, there are 62 characters (out of 49,030) to be found under this radical.

彡 is also the 42nd indexing component in the Table of Indexing Chinese Character Components predominantly adopted by Simplified Chinese dictionaries published in mainland China. It is extremely similar to the katakana Mi, the only difference is being flipped 180 degrees.

== Evolution ==
Component of 髟; unrelated to 三 (and its derivative ミ) and 巛; compare 而.

Large seal script character

Small seal script character

== Derived characters ==
Strokes	Characters
+0	彡
+4	形 彣 彤
+6	彥 彦^{SC/JP} (=彥) 须^{SC} (=須 -> 頁 / 鬚 -> 髟)
+7	彧 彨 (=彲)
+8	彩 彪 彫^{JP/variant} (=雕 -> 隹) 彬
+9	彭
+10	彮
+11	彯 彰
+12	影
+19	彲

== Literature ==
- Fazzioli, Edoardo (1987). Chinese calligraphy : from pictograph to ideogram : the history of 214 essential Chinese/Japanese characters. calligraphy by Rebecca Hon Ko. New York: Abbeville Press. ISBN 0-89659-774-1.
- Lunde, Ken (Jan 5, 2009). "Appendix J: Japanese Character Sets" (PDF). CJKV Information Processing: Chinese, Japanese, Korean & Vietnamese Computing (Second ed.). Sebastopol, Calif.: O'Reilly Media. ISBN 978-0-596-51447-1.
