= Radical 17 =

Chinese character radical

凵
- Radical 17 (U+2F10)
- 凵 (U+51F5) "receptacle"

Pronunciations
- Pinyin: kǎn
- Bopomofo: ㄎㄢˇ
- Wade–Giles: kʻan3
- Cantonese Yale: hom1
- Jyutping: ham3
- Pe̍h-ōe-jī: khám
- Japanese Kana: カン kan (on'yomi)
- Sino-Korean: 감 gam
- Hán-Việt: khảm

Names
- Chinese name(s): 凶字框 xiōngzìkuàng 下三框 xiàsānkuāng
- Japanese name(s): 凵繞/かんにょう kannyō 受け箱/うけばこ ukebako 下箱/したばこ shitabako 函構/かんがまえ kangamae
- Hangul: 입벌릴 ip beolril

Stroke order animation

Radical 17 or radical open box (凵部) is one of 23 of the 214 Kangxi radicals that are composed of two strokes.

凵 is also the 20th indexing component in the Table of Indexing Chinese Character Components predominantly adopted by Simplified Chinese dictionaries published in mainland China.

In the Kangxi Dictionary, there are 23 characters (out of 49,030) to be found under this radical.

As for the similar radicals 22 匚 and 13 冂, the name of radical 17 is purely descriptive of its shape, 下三框 "lower three-sided frame".

== Evolution ==
Compare 冂, 匸 and 匚.

Oracle bone script character

Chu slip and silk script

Large seal script character

Small seal script character

== Derived characters ==
Strokes	Characters
+0	凵
+2	凶 (bad, inauspicious)
+3	凷 凸 凹 出 (go out, send out) 击^{SC} (=擊 -> 手, to hit)
+4	凼
+6	函^{SC/TC variant}/函^{Kangxi/JP/KO variant} (box)
+7	凾 (=函)
+10	凿^{SC} (=鑿 -> 金)

The radical does not occur as a character on its own. In combination, it historically takes meanings such as "open mouth", "box", "frame", "hole" or "receptacle".

Also derived from the radical are the Simplified Chinese characters including 击 "to hit", without any historical connection to the radical.

幽 "deep, dark" is derived from radical 46 (山 "mountain") rather than radical 17.

== Literature ==
- Fazzioli, Edoardo (1987). Chinese calligraphy : from pictograph to ideogram : the history of 214 essential Chinese/Japanese characters. calligraphy by Rebecca Hon Ko. New York: Abbeville Press. ISBN 0-89659-774-1.
- Leyi Li: “Tracing the Roots of Chinese Characters: 500 Cases”. Beijing 1993, ISBN 978-7-5619-0204-2
- KangXi: page 134, character 17
