= Radical 3 =

Kangxi radical

丶
- Radical 3 (U+2F02)
- 丶 (U+4E36) "dot"

Pronunciations
- Pinyin: zhǔ
- Bopomofo: ㄓㄨˇ
- Wade–Giles: chu3
- Cantonese Yale: jyú
- Jyutping: zyu2
- Pe̍h-ōe-jī: tú
- Japanese Kana: チュ chu (on'yomi) てん ten (kun'yomi)
- Sino-Korean: 주 ju
- Hán-Việt: chủ

Names
- Chinese name(s): 點/点 diǎn
- Japanese name(s): 点 ten ちょぼ chobo
- Hangul: 점 jeom

Stroke order animation

Radical 3 or radical dot (丶部) meaning "to indicate an end" is one of six of the 214 Kangxi radicals that are composed of only one stroke.

In the Kangxi Dictionary, there are only 10 characters (out of 49,030) to be found under this radical.

丶 is also the 3rd indexing component in the Table of Indexing Chinese Character Components predominantly adopted by Simplified Chinese dictionaries published in mainland China.

== Evolution ==
Bronze script character

Small seal script character

== Derived characters ==
Strokes	Characters
+0	丶 (zhǔ "dot")
+1	丷^{KO} (Korean kwukyel note)
+2	丸^{SC/JP}/丸^{TC} (wán "pellet")
+3	丹 (dān "vermillion"), 为^{SC} (=爲 -> 爪 / 為 -> 火 wéi "to do, to be; for")
+4	主 (zhǔ "owner, master; main") 丼 (dǎn onomatopoeia / =井 -> 二 jǐng "water well")
+7	丽^{SC} (=麗 -> 鹿 lì "pretty, lovely")
+8	举^{SC} (=舉 -> 臼 jǔ "raise, recommend")

== In calligraphy ==
The dot stroke as in 永

The only stroke in Radical 3, known as 點/点 diǎn "dot", is called 側/侧 cè in the eight principles of the character 永 (永字八法 Yǒngzì Bāfǎ) which are the basis of Chinese calligraphy.

== Literature ==
- Fazzioli, Edoardo (1987). Chinese calligraphy : from pictograph to ideogram : the history of 214 essential Chinese/Japanese characters. calligraphy by Rebecca Hon Ko. New York: Abbeville Press. ISBN 0-89659-774-1.
- Leyi, Li (1993). Tracing the Roots of Chinese Characters: 500 Cases. Beijing. ISBN 978-7-5619-0204-2.
