= Radical 114 =

Chinese character radical

禸
- Radical 114 (U+2F71)
- 禸 (U+79B8) "track"

Pronunciations
- Pinyin: róu
- Bopomofo: ㄖㄡˊ
- Wade–Giles: jou2
- Cantonese Yale: yau2
- Jyutping: jau2
- Japanese Kana: ジュウ jū (on'yomi)
- Sino-Korean: 유 yu

Names
- Japanese name(s): 寓の脚/ぐうのあし gūnoashi
- Hangul: 자귀 jagwi

Stroke order animation

Radical 114 or radical track (禸部) meaning "rump" or "track" is one of the 23 Kangxi radicals (214 radicals in total) composed of 5 strokes.

In the Kangxi Dictionary, there are 12 characters (out of 49,030) to be found under this radical.

禸 is not listed in the Table of Indexing Chinese Character Components, hence not used as a Simplified Chinese radical (indexing component).

== Evolution ==
Small seal script character

== Derived characters ==
Strokes	Characters
+0	禸
+4	禹 禺
+6	离 (also SC form of 離 -> 隹)
+7	禼
+8	禽

== Variant forms ==
The radical character as an independent Chinese character takes different forms in different languages.

Trad. Chinese (Taiwan)	Simp. Chinese	Japanese	Korean
禸	禸	禸	禸

When used as a component, its form depends on not only languages but also characters.

Trad. Chinese (Taiwan)	Simp. Chinese	Japanese	Korean
禺 离	禺 离	禺 离	禺 离

== Literature ==
- Fazzioli, Edoardo (1987). Chinese calligraphy : from pictograph to ideogram : the history of 214 essential Chinese/Japanese characters. calligraphy by Rebecca Hon Ko. New York: Abbeville Press. ISBN 0-89659-774-1.
- Lunde, Ken (Jan 5, 2009). "Appendix J: Japanese Character Sets" (PDF). CJKV Information Processing: Chinese, Japanese, Korean & Vietnamese Computing (Second ed.). Sebastopol, Calif.: O'Reilly Media. ISBN 978-0-596-51447-1.
