= Radical 104 =

Chinese character radical

疒
- Radical 104 (U+2F67)
- 疒 (U+7592) "sickness"

Pronunciations
- Pinyin: chuáng, nè
- Bopomofo: ㄔㄨㄤˊ, ㄋㄜˋ
- Gwoyeu Romatzyh: chwang, neh
- Wade–Giles: chʻuang^{2}, nê^{4}
- Cantonese Yale: nihk
- Jyutping: nik6
- Japanese Kana: ダク daku / ニャク nyaku (on'yomi)
- Sino-Korean: 녁 nyeok

Names
- Chinese name(s): 病字頭/病字头 bìngzìtóu
- Japanese name(s): 病垂/やまいだれ yamaidare
- Hangul: 병 byeong

Stroke order animation

Radical 104 or radical sickness (疒部) meaning "sickness" is one of the 23 Kangxi radicals (214 radicals in total) composed of 5 strokes.

In the Kangxi Dictionary, there are 526 characters (out of 49,030) to be found under this radical.

疒 is also the 115th indexing component in the Table of Indexing Chinese Character Components predominantly adopted by Simplified Chinese dictionaries published in mainland China.

== Evolution ==
A bed (爿) and a person 人.

Oracle bone script character

Bronze script character

Small seal script character

== Derived characters ==
Strokes	Characters
+0	疒
+2	疓 疔 疕 疖^{SC} (=癤) 疗^{SC} (=療)
+3	疘 (=肛 -> 肉) 疙 疚 疛 疜 疝 疞 疟^{SC} (=瘧) 疠^{SC} (=癘)
+4	疡^{SC} (=瘍) 疢 疣 疤 疥 疦 疧 疨 疩 (=瘁) 疪 疫 疬^{SC} (=癧) 疭^{SC} (=瘲) 疮^{SC} (=瘡) 疯^{SC} (=瘋) 疺
+5	疰 疱^{SC} (=皰) 疲 疳 疴^{SC} (=痾) 疵 疶 疷 疸 疹 疻 疼 疽 疾 疿 (=痱) 痀 痁 痂 痃 痄 病 痆 症 痈^{SC} (=癰) 痉^{SC} (=痙)
+6	痊 痋 痌 痍 痎 痏 痐 (=蛔 -> 虫) 痑 痒^{SC/JP} (=癢) 痓 痔 痕 痖^{SC} (=瘂)
+7	痗 痘 痙 痚 痛 痜 痝 痞 痟 痠 痡 痢 痣 痤 痥 痦 痧 痨^{SC} (=癆) 痩^{JP} (=瘦) 痪^{SC} (=瘓) 痫^{SC} (=癇)
+8	痬 痭 痮 痯 痰 痱 痲 痳 痴 痵 痶 痷 痸 痹^{SC} (=痺) 痺 痻 痼 痽 痾 痿 瘀 瘁 瘂 (=啞 -> 口) 瘃 瘄 瘅^{SC} (=癉) 瘆^{SC} (=瘮)
+9	瘇 (=尰 -> 尢) 瘈 瘉 (=癒) 瘊 瘋 瘌 瘍 瘎 瘏 瘐 瘑 瘒 瘓 瘔 瘕 瘖 瘗^{SC} (=瘞) 瘘^{SC} (=瘺) 瘟 瘧
+10	瘙 瘚 瘛 瘜 瘝 瘞 瘠 瘡 瘢 瘣 瘤 瘥 瘦 瘨 瘩 瘪^{SC} (=癟) 瘫^{SC} (=癱)
+11	瘬 瘭 瘮 瘯 瘰 瘱 瘲 瘳 瘴 瘵 瘶 瘷 瘸 瘹 瘺 瘻 (=瘺) 瘼 瘽 瘾^{SC} (=癮) 瘿^{SC} (=癭) 癊
+12	癀 癁 療 癃 癄 (=憔 -> 心 / 𥡤 -> 禾) 癅 (=瘤) 癆 癇 癈 (=廢 -> 广) 癉 癋 癌 癍 癎 (=癇)
+13	癏 (=瘝) 癐 癑 癒 癓 癔 癕 癖 癗 癘 癙 癚 癛 癜 癝 癞^{SC} (=癩)
+14	癟 癠 癡 (=痴) 癣^{SC} (=癬)
+15	癢 癤 癥 癦
+16	癧 癨 癩 癪 癫^{SC} (=癲)
+17	癬 癭 癮
+18	癯 癰
+19	癱 癲
+21	癳
+23	癴
+25	癵

== Literature ==
- Fazzioli, Edoardo (1987). Chinese calligraphy : from pictograph to ideogram : the history of 214 essential Chinese/Japanese characters. calligraphy by Rebecca Hon Ko. New York: Abbeville Press. ISBN 0-89659-774-1.
- Lunde, Ken (Jan 5, 2009). "Appendix J: Japanese Character Sets" (PDF). CJKV Information Processing: Chinese, Japanese, Korean & Vietnamese Computing (Second ed.). Sebastopol, Calif.: O'Reilly Media. ISBN 978-0-596-51447-1.
