= Table of Indexing Chinese Character Components =

Lexicographic tool used to order the Chinese characters

The Table of Indexing Chinese Character Components (simplified Chinese: 汉字部首表; traditional Chinese: 漢字部首表; pinyin: hànzì bùshǒu biǎo; lit. 'Chinese character radicals table') is a lexicographic tool used to order the Chinese characters in mainland China. The specification is also known as GF 0011-2009.

In China's normative documents, "radical" is defined as any component or 偏旁 piānpáng of Chinese characters, while 部首 is translated as "indexing component".

== History ==
In 1983, the Committee for Reforming the Chinese Written Language and the State Administration of Publication of China published The Table of Unified Indexing Chinese Character Components (Draft) (汉字统一部首表（草案）), a draft version of the current standard. In 2009, the Ministry of Education of the People's Republic of China and the State Language Work Committee issued The Table of Indexing Chinese Character Components (GF 0011-2009 汉字部首表), which includes 201 principal indexing components and 100 associated indexing components.

== Usage ==
This table has been adopted in the newer versions of Xinhua Zidian and Xiandai Hanyu Cidian. While mainland China has a different method to identify a Chinese character's indexing component (as prescribed in "GB13000.1字符集汉字部首归部规范" Specification for Identifying Indexing Components of GB 13000.1 Chinese Characters Set [sic]) from Traditional Chinese dictionaries, many dictionaries (usually arranged in hanyu pinyin order) index Chinese character in a "multi-entry" way which allow readers to look up a character through different radicals.

The specification specifies the table may also be used in Traditional Chinese dictionaries or dictionaries that collect both traditional and simplified forms of Chinese characters with some necessary adjustments.

== List of radicals ==
- 1 stroke: 一 丨 丶 丿 乛
- 2 strokes: 十 厂 匚 卜 冂 八 人 勹 儿 匕 几 亠 冫 冖 凵 卩 刀 力 又 厶 廴
- 3 strokes: 干 工 土 艹 寸 廾 大 尢 弋 小 口 囗 山 巾 彳 彡 夕 夂 丬 广 门 宀 辶 彐 尸 己 弓 子 屮 女 飞 马 么 巛
- 4 strokes: 王 无 韦 木 支 犬 歹 车 牙 戈 比 瓦 止 攴 日 贝 水 见 牛 手 气 毛 长 片 斤 爪 父 月 氏 欠 风 殳 文 方 火 斗 户 心 毋
- 5 strokes: 示 甘 石 龙 业 目 田 罒 皿 生 矢 禾 白 瓜 鸟 疒 立 穴 疋 皮 癶 矛
- 6 strokes: 耒 老 耳 臣 覀 而 页 至 虍 虫 肉 缶 舌 竹 臼 自 血 舟 色 齐 衣 羊 米 聿 艮 羽 糸
- 7 strokes: 麦 走 赤 豆 酉 辰 豕 卤 里 足 邑 身 釆 谷 豸 龟 角 言 辛
- 8 strokes: 青 龺 雨 非 齿 黾 隹 阜 金 鱼 隶
- 9 strokes: 革 面 韭 骨 香 鬼 食 音 首
- 10 strokes: 髟 鬲 鬥 高
- 11 strokes: 黄 麻 鹿
- 12 strokes: 鼎 黑 黍
- 13 strokes: 鼓 鼠
- 14 strokes: 鼻
- 17 strokes: 龠

== See also ==
- Radical (Chinese character)
- List of Shuowen Jiezi radicals
- List of Unicode radicals
  - Unicode chart - Kangxi Radicals
  - Unicode Chart - CJK Radicals Supplement
- List of Kangxi radicals - 214 radicals
- Table of Japanese kanji radicals
  - Simplified table of Japanese kanji radicals
