= Radical 92 =

Simplified Chinese character radical

牙
- Radical 92 (U+2F5B)
- 牙 (U+7259) "tooth, fang"

Pronunciations
- Pinyin: yá
- Bopomofo: ㄧㄚˊ
- Wade–Giles: ya2
- Cantonese Yale: ngàh
- Jyutping: ngaa4
- Pe̍h-ōe-jī: gâ
- Japanese Kana: ガ ga / ゲ ge (on'yomi) きば kiba (kun'yomi)
- Sino-Korean: 아 a

Names
- Japanese name(s): 牙/きば kiba
- Hangul: 어금니 eogeumni

Stroke order animation

Radical 92 or radical fang (牙部) meaning "tooth" or "fang" is one of the 34 Kangxi radicals (214 radicals total) composed of four strokes.

In the Kangxi Dictionary, there are nine characters (out of 49,030) to be found under this radical.

牙 is also the 69th indexing component in the Table of Indexing Chinese Character Components predominantly adopted by Simplified Chinese dictionaries published in mainland China.

== Evolution ==
Unrelated to 矛; compare 齒.

Bronze script character

Chu slip and silk script

Large seal script character

Small seal script character

== Derived characters ==
Strokes	Characters
+0	牙
+8	牚

== Sinogram ==
As an independent sinogram it is a Jōyō kanji, or a kanji used in writing the Japanese language. It is a secondary school kanji. It has design variations officially recognized by the Japanese government. It is also used in Chinese.

== See also ==
- List of jōyō kanji
