= Radical 175 =

Chinese character radical

非
- Radical 175 (U+2FAE)
- 非 (U+975E) "wrong"

Pronunciations
- Pinyin: fēi
- Bopomofo: ㄈㄟ
- Wade–Giles: fei1
- Cantonese Yale: fei1
- Jyutping: fei1
- Japanese Kana: ヒ hi (on'yomi) あら-ず ara-zu (kun'yomi)
- Sino-Korean: 비 bi
- Hán-Việt: phi, phỉ

Names
- Japanese name(s): あらず arazu
- Hangul: 아닐 anil

Stroke order animation

Radical 175 or radical wrong (非部) meaning "wrong" is one of the 9 Kangxi radicals (214 radicals in total) composed of 8 strokes.

In the Kangxi Dictionary, there are 25 characters (out of 49,030) to be found under this radical.

非 is also the 171st indexing component in the Table of Indexing Chinese Character Components predominantly adopted by Simplified Chinese dictionaries published in mainland China.

== Evolution ==
Oracle bone script character

Bronze script character

Small seal script character

Han dynasty Clerical script

It is etymologically unrelated to 韭.

== Derived characters ==
Strokes	Characters
+0	非
+4	靟
+7	靠
+11	靡

== Variant forms ==
This radical character is written differently in Simplified Chinese compared with other languages. In mainland China's writing reform, xin zixing, or the new printing typeface, adopted a more vulgar and symmetric form 非. This change may also be applied to Traditional Chinese publications in mainland China.

非 in Traditional Chinese, Japanese and Korean

非 in Simplified Chinese

== Kanji ==
In the Japanese educational system this is one of the Kyōiku kanji. Students are required to learn it in the fifth grade.

== Literature ==
- Fazzioli, Edoardo (1987). Chinese calligraphy : from pictograph to ideogram : the history of 214 essential Chinese/Japanese characters. calligraphy by Rebecca Hon Ko. New York: Abbeville Press. ISBN 0-89659-774-1.
- Lunde, Ken (Jan 5, 2009). "Appendix J: Japanese Character Sets" (PDF). CJKV Information Processing: Chinese, Japanese, Korean & Vietnamese Computing (Second ed.). Sebastopol, Calif.: O'Reilly Media. ISBN 978-0-596-51447-1.
