= Radical 163 =

Chinese character radical

邑
- Radical 163 (U+2FA2)
- 邑 (U+9091) "city"

Pronunciations
- Pinyin: yì
- Bopomofo: ㄧˋ
- Wade–Giles: i4
- Cantonese Yale: yap1
- Jyutping: jap1
- Japanese Kana: ユウ yū / オウ ō (on'yomi)
- Sino-Korean: 읍 eup
- Hán-Việt: ấp

Names
- Chinese name(s): (⻏) 右耳旁 yòu'ěrpáng
- Japanese name(s): おおざと oozato
- Hangul: 고을 goeul

Stroke order animation

Stroke order of 阝

Radical 163 or radical city (邑部) meaning "city" is one of the 20 Kangxi radicals (214 radicals in total) composed of 7 strokes. This radical character transforms into 阝 (counted as 3 strokes in Traditional Chinese, 2 strokes in Simplified Chinese) when used as a right component (not to be confused with 阝 on the left derived from 阜).

In the Kangxi Dictionary, there are 350 characters (out of 49,030) to be found under this radical.

邑 is also the 159th indexing component in the Table of Indexing Chinese Character Components predominantly adopted by Simplified Chinese dictionaries published in mainland China, with 阝 (right) listed as its associated indexing components.

== Evolution ==
Oracle bone script character

Bronze script character

Large seal script character

Small seal script character

== Derived characters ==
Strokes	Characters
+0	邑
+2	邒 邓^{SC} (=鄧)
+3	邔 邕 邖 邗 邘 邙 邚 邛 邜 邝^{SC} (=鄺)
+4	邞 邟 邠 邡 邢 那 邤 邥 邦 邧 邨 (=村 -> 木) 邩 邪 邫 (=邦) 邬^{SC} (=鄔)
+5	邭 邮^{SC} (=郵) 邯 邰 邱 邲 邳 邴 邵 邶 邷 邸 邹^{SC} (=鄒) 邺^{SC} (=鄴) 邻^{SC} (=鄰)
+6	邼 邽 邾 邿 郀 郁^{SC} (=鬱 -> 鬯) 郂 郃 郄 郅 郆 郇 郈 郉 (=邢) 郊 郋 郌 郍 郎 郏^{SC} (=郟) 郐^{SC} (=鄶) 郑^{SC} (=鄭) 郓^{SC} (=鄆)
+7	郒 郔 郕 郖 郗 郘 郙 郚 郛 郜 郝 郞 (=郎) 郟 郠 郡 郢 郣 郤 郥 郦^{SC} (=酈) 郧^{SC} (=鄖)
+8	部 郩 郪 郫 郬 郭 郮 郯 郰 郱 郲 郳 郴 郵 郶 (=部) 郷^{JP} (=鄉) 郸^{SC} (=鄲)
+9	郹 郺 郻 郼 都 郾 郿 鄀 鄁 鄂 鄃 鄄 鄅 鄆 鄇 鄈 鄉 鄊 (=鄉)
+10	鄋 鄌 鄍 鄎 鄏 鄐 鄑 鄒 鄓 鄔 鄕 (=鄉) 鄖 鄗
+11	鄘 鄙 鄚 鄛 鄜 鄝 鄞 鄟 鄠 鄡 鄢 鄣 鄤 鄥
+12	鄦 鄧 鄨 鄩 鄪 鄫 鄬 鄭 鄮 鄯 鄰 鄱 鄲
+13	鄳 鄴 鄵 鄶 鄷
+14	鄸 鄹
+15	鄺 鄻 鄼 鄽 鄾
+16	鄿 酀 酂^{SC} (=酇)
+17	酁 酃
+18	酄 酅 酆
+19	酇 酈

== Literature ==
- Fazzioli, Edoardo (1987). Chinese calligraphy : from pictograph to ideogram : the history of 214 essential Chinese/Japanese characters. calligraphy by Rebecca Hon Ko. New York: Abbeville Press. ISBN 0-89659-774-1.
- Lunde, Ken (Jan 5, 2009). "Appendix J: Japanese Character Sets" (PDF). CJKV Information Processing: Chinese, Japanese, Korean & Vietnamese Computing (Second ed.). Sebastopol, Calif.: O'Reilly Media. ISBN 978-0-596-51447-1.
