= Radical 183 =

Chinese character radical

飛
- Radical 183 (U+2FB6)
- 飛 (U+98DB) "fly"

Pronunciations
- Pinyin: fēi
- Bopomofo: ㄈㄟ
- Wade–Giles: fei1
- Cantonese Yale: fei1
- Jyutping: fei1
- Japanese Kana: ヒ hi (on'yomi) と-ぶ to-bu / と-ばす to-basu (kun'yomi)
- Sino-Korean: 비 bi
- Hán-Việt: phi, bay

Names
- Japanese name(s): 飛ぶ/とぶ tobu
- Hangul: 날 nal

Stroke order animation

Stroke order of the simplified form 飞

Radical 183 or radical fly (飛部) meaning "flying" is one of the 11 Kangxi radicals out of 214 composed of 9 strokes.

In the Kangxi Dictionary, there are 92 characters (out of 49,030) to be found under this radical.

飞, the simplified form of 飛, is the 57th indexing component in the Table of Indexing Chinese Character Components predominantly adopted by Simplified Chinese dictionaries published in mainland China, while the traditional form 飛 is listed as its associated indexing component.

== Evolution ==
Oracle bone script character

Chu slip and silk script

Large seal script character

Small seal script character

== Derived characters ==
Strokes	Characters
+0	飛 飞^{SC} (=飛)
+12	飜 (=翻 -> 羽)
+18	飝 (=飛)

== Sinogram ==
The radical is also used as an independent Chinese character. It is one of the Kyōiku kanji or Kanji taught in elementary school in Japan. It is a fourth grade kanji.

== Literature ==
- Fazzioli, Edoardo (1987). Chinese calligraphy : from pictograph to ideogram : the history of 214 essential Chinese/Japanese characters. calligraphy by Rebecca Hon Ko. New York: Abbeville Press. ISBN 0-89659-774-1.
- Lunde, Ken (Jan 5, 2009). "Appendix J: Japanese Character Sets" (PDF). CJKV Information Processing: Chinese, Japanese, Korean & Vietnamese Computing (Second ed.). Sebastopol, Calif.: O'Reilly Media. ISBN 978-0-596-51447-1.
