= Radical 193 =

Chinese character radical

鬲
- Radical 193 (U+2FC0)
- 鬲 (U+9B32) "cauldron, tripod"

Pronunciations
- Pinyin: lì
- Bopomofo: ㄌㄧˋ
- Wade–Giles: li4
- Cantonese Yale: gaak3, lik6
- Jyutping: gaak3, lik6
- Japanese Kana: レキ reki (on'yomi) かなえ kanae (kun'yomi)
- Sino-Korean: 력 ryeok
- Hán-Việt: cách

Names
- Japanese name(s): 鬲/かなえ kanae
- Hangul: 다리 굽은 솥 dari gubeun sot

Stroke order animation

Radical 193 or radical cauldron (鬲部) meaning "cauldron" or "tripod" is one of the 8 Kangxi radicals (214 radicals in total) composed of 10 strokes.

In the Kangxi Dictionary, there are 73 characters (out of 49,030) to be found under this radical.

鬲 is also the 189th indexing component in the Table of Indexing Chinese Character Components predominantly adopted by Simplified Chinese dictionaries published in mainland China.

== Evolution ==
Oracle bone script character

Bronze script character

Large seal script character

Small seal script character

== Derived characters ==
Strokes	Characters
+0	鬲
+6	鬳
+7	鬴
+8	鬵 鬶^{SC} (=鬹)
+9	鬷
+10	鬸
+11	鬹 鬺
+12	鬻

== Variant forms ==
Standard form in Japanese and Korean
Alternative form in Traditional Chinese

Standard form in Traditional Chinese and Simplified Chinese

Alternative form

== Literature ==
- Fazzioli, Edoardo (1987). Chinese calligraphy : from pictograph to ideogram : the history of 214 essential Chinese/Japanese characters. calligraphy by Rebecca Hon Ko. New York: Abbeville Press. ISBN 0-89659-774-1.

== See also ==
- Zhu Rong (god)
