= Radical 127 =

Chinese character radical

耒
- Radical 127 (U+2F7E)
- 耒 (U+8012) "plough"

Pronunciations
- Pinyin: lěi
- Bopomofo: ㄌㄟˇ
- Wade–Giles: lei3
- Cantonese Yale: leui6, loi6
- Jyutping: leoi6, loi6
- Japanese Kana: ライ rai (on'yomi) すき suki (kun'yomi)
- Sino-Korean: 뢰 roe

Names
- Japanese name(s): (Left) 耒偏/すきへん sukihen らいすき raisuki
- Hangul: 쟁기 jaenggi

Stroke order animation

Radical 127 or radical plough (耒部) meaning "plough" is one of the 29 Kangxi radicals (214 radicals in total) composed of 6 strokes.

In the Kangxi Dictionary, there are 84 characters (out of 49,030) to be found under this radical.

耒 is also the 122nd indexing component in the Table of Indexing Chinese Character Components predominantly adopted by Simplified Chinese dictionaries published in mainland China.

== Evolution ==
Bronze script character

Large seal script character

Small seal script character

== Derived characters ==
Strokes	Characters
+0	耒
+2	耓
+3	耔
+4	耕 耖 耗 耘 耙
+5	耚 耛 耜 耝 耞 耟
+6	耠
+7	耡 耢^{SC} (=耮)
+8	耣 耤 耥
+9	耦 耧^{SC} (=耬)
+10	耨 耩 耪
+11	耫 耬
+12	耭 耮
+14	耯
+15	耰
+16	耱 耲

== Variant forms ==
Traditionally, the first stroke of this radical character is a right-to-left slash. In Simplified Chinese xin zixing, it becomes a horizontal stroke. A similar change was also applied to Japanese jōyō kanji, while hyōgai kanji remain unchanged.

Trad. Chinese Korean	Japanese	Simp. Chinese
耒 耕 耘	耒 耕 耘	耒 耕 耘

== Literature ==
- Fazzioli, Edoardo (1987). Chinese calligraphy : from pictograph to ideogram : the history of 214 essential Chinese/Japanese characters. calligraphy by Rebecca Hon Ko. New York: Abbeville Press. ISBN 0-89659-774-1.
