= Radical 192 =

Chinese character radical

鬯
- Radical 192 (U+2FBF)
- 鬯 (U+9B2F) "sacrificial wine"

Pronunciations
- Pinyin: chàng
- Bopomofo: ㄔㄤˋ
- Wade–Giles: ch'ang4
- Cantonese Yale: cheung3
- Jyutping: coeng3
- Japanese Kana: チョウ chō (on'yomi) の-びる no-biru (kun'yomi)
- Sino-Korean: 창 chang
- Hán-Việt: sưởng

Names
- Japanese name(s): 鬯/ちょう chō においざけ nioizake
- Hangul: 울창주 ulchangju

Stroke order animation

Radical 192 or radical sacrificial wine (鬯部) meaning "sacrificial wine" is one of the 8 Kangxi radicals (214 radicals in total) composed of 10 strokes.

In the Kangxi Dictionary, there are eight characters (out of 49,035) to be found under this radical.

鬯 is not listed as a Simplified Chinese indexing component in the Table of Indexing Chinese Character Components

== Evolution ==
Oracle bone script character

Bronze script character

Large seal script character

Small seal script character

== Derived characters ==
Strokes	Characters
+0	鬯
+17	鬰 (=鬱)
+19	鬱

== Literature ==
- Fazzioli, Edoardo (1987). Chinese calligraphy : from pictograph to ideogram : the history of 214 essential Chinese/Japanese characters. calligraphy by Rebecca Hon Ko. New York: Abbeville Press. ISBN 0-89659-774-1.
- Lunde, Ken (Jan 5, 2009). "Appendix J: Japanese Character Sets" (PDF). CJKV Information Processing: Chinese, Japanese, Korean & Vietnamese Computing (Second ed.). Sebastopol, Calif.: O'Reilly Media. ISBN 978-0-596-51447-1.
