= Radical 54 =

Chinese character radical

廴
- Radical 54 (U+2F35)
- 廴 (U+5EF4) "long stride"

Pronunciations
- Pinyin: yǐn
- Bopomofo: ㄧㄣˇ
- Gwoyeu Romatzyh: yiin
- Wade–Giles: yin^{3}
- Cantonese Yale: yán
- Jyutping: jan2
- Pe̍h-ōe-jī: ín
- Japanese Kana: イン in (on'yomi)
- Sino-Korean: 인 in

Names
- Chinese name(s): 建字底 jiànzìdǐ
- Japanese name(s): 延繞/えんにょう ennyō 廴繞/いんにょう innyō 建繞/けんにょう kennyō
- Hangul: 끌 kkeul

Stroke order animation

Radical 54 or radical long stride (廴部) meaning "long stride" is one of the 31 Kangxi radicals (214 radicals in total) composed of three strokes.

In the Kangxi Dictionary, there are nine characters (out of 49,030) to be found under this radical.

廴 is also the 26th indexing component in the Table of Indexing Chinese Character Components predominantly adopted by Simplified Chinese dictionaries published in mainland China. While this radical is composed of three strokes in Traditional Chinese, it is treated as a two-stroke component in Simplified Chinese, with the two turning strokes becoming one continuous stroke.

== Evolution ==
Large seal script character

Small seal script character

== Derived characters ==
Strokes	Characters
+0	廴
+3	廵 (=巡 → 辵)
+4	延 廷 廸 (=迪 → 辵)
+5	廹 (=迫 → 辵)
+6	建 廻^{JP} (=迴 → 辵) 廼 (=乃 → 丿)
+7	廽 (=廻=迴 → 辵)

== Literature ==
- Fazzioli, Edoardo (1987). Chinese calligraphy : from pictograph to ideogram : the history of 214 essential Chinese/Japanese characters. calligraphy by Rebecca Hon Ko. New York: Abbeville Press. ISBN 0-89659-774-1.
- Lunde, Ken (Jan 5, 2009). "Appendix J: Japanese Character Sets" (PDF). CJKV Information Processing: Chinese, Japanese, Korean & Vietnamese Computing (Second ed.). Sebastopol, Calif.: O'Reilly Media. ISBN 978-0-596-51447-1.
