= Radical 13 =

Chinese character radical

冂
- Radical 13 (U+2F0C)
- 冂 (U+5182) "wide"

Pronunciations
- Pinyin: jiōng
- Bopomofo: ㄐㄩㄥ
- Gwoyeu Romatzyh: jiong
- Wade–Giles: chiung^{1}
- Cantonese Yale: gwing2
- Jyutping: gwing1
- Pe̍h-ōe-jī: keng
- Japanese Kana: ケイ kē (on'yomi)
- Sino-Korean: 경 gyeong
- Hán-Việt: quynh

Names
- Chinese name(s): 同字框 tóngzìkuàng
- Japanese name(s): 冏構/けいがまえ kēgamae 牧構/まきがまえ makigamae 同構/どうがまえ dōgamae 円構/えんがまえ engamae
- Hangul: 멀 meol

Stroke order animation

Radical 13 or radical down box (冂部), meaning wide, is one of 23 of the 214 Kangxi radicals that are composed of 2 strokes. In the Kangxi Dictionary, there are 50 characters (out of 49,030) to be found under this radical. 冂 is also the 10th indexing component in the Table of Indexing Chinese Character Components predominantly adopted by Simplified Chinese dictionaries published in mainland China.

== Evolution ==
Bronze script character

Large seal script character

Small seal script character

== Derived characters ==
| Strokes | Characters |
|---|---|
| +0 | 冂 |
| +2 | 冃 冄 (=冉) 内^{SC/JP} (=內 -> 入) 円^{JP} (=圓 -> 囗) 冇 冈 (SC form of 岡 -> 山 / ancient variant of 网 -> 网) |
| +3 | 冉 冊^{TC/JP/KO variant} 冋 册^{SC variant} (=冊) 囘 (=回 -> 囗) |
| +4 | 再 冎 |
| +5 | 冏 |
| +6 | 冐 |
| +7 | 冑 冒 |
| +8 | 冓 冔 |
| +9 | 冕 |

== Literature ==
- Fazzioli, Edoardo (1987). Chinese calligraphy : from pictograph to ideogram : the history of 214 essential Chinese/Japanese characters. calligraphy by Rebecca Hon Ko. New York: Abbeville Press. ISBN 0-89659-774-1.
- Leyi Li: “Tracing the Roots of Chinese Characters: 500 Cases”. Beijing 1993, ISBN 978-7-5619-0204-2
- KangXi: page 128, character 30
- Dai Kanwa Jiten: character 1506
- Dae Jaweon: page 289, character 9
- Hanyu Da Zidian: volume 1, page 96, character 13
