= Radical 47 =

Chinese character radical

巛
- Radical 47 (U+2F2E)
- 巛 (U+5DDB) "river"

Pronunciations
- Pinyin: chuān
- Bopomofo: ㄔㄨㄢ
- Gwoyeu Romatzyh: chuan
- Wade–Giles: chʻuan^{1}
- Cantonese Yale: chyūn
- Jyutping: cyun1
- Pe̍h-ōe-jī: chhoan
- Japanese Kana: セン sen (on'yomi) かわ kawa (kun'yomi)
- Sino-Korean: 천 cheon

Names
- Chinese name(s): 三拐 sānguǎi
- Japanese name(s): 川/かわ kawa 曲がり川/まがりがわ magarigawa 曲げ川/まげかわ magekawa 三本川/さんぼんがわ sanbongawa
- Hangul: 내 nae

Stroke order animation

Radical 47 or radical river (巛部) meaning "river" is one of the 31 Kangxi radicals (214 radicals total) composed of three strokes.

In the Kangxi Dictionary, there are 26 characters (out of 49,030) to be found under this radical.

巛 is also the 60th indexing component in the Table of Indexing Chinese Character Components predominantly adopted by Simplified Chinese dictionaries published in mainland China.

== Evolution ==
Compare 水; unrelated to 彡 and 爪.

Oracle bone script character

Bronze script character

Warring States period bronze script

Chu slip and silk script

Qin slip script

Large seal script character

Small seal script character

=== 州 ===
Islet in a river.

Oracle bone script

Bronze script

Warring States period bronze script

Chu slip and silk script

Large seal script

Small seal script

== Derived characters ==
Strokes	Characters
+0	巛 巜 川
+3	州 巟 巠 巡
+8	巢 巣^{JP} (=巢)
+12	巤

== Literature ==
- Fazzioli, Edoardo (1987). Chinese calligraphy : from pictograph to ideogram : the history of 214 essential Chinese/Japanese characters. calligraphy by Rebecca Hon Ko. New York: Abbeville Press. ISBN 0-89659-774-1.
- Lunde, Ken (Jan 5, 2009). "Appendix J: Japanese Character Sets" (PDF). CJKV Information Processing: Chinese, Japanese, Korean & Vietnamese Computing (Second ed.). Sebastopol, Calif.: O'Reilly Media. ISBN 978-0-596-51447-1.
