= Radical 153 =

Chinese character radical

豸
- Radical 153 (U+2F98)
- 豸 (U+8C78) "badger, legless insect"

Pronunciations
- Pinyin: zhì
- Bopomofo: ㄓˋ
- Wade–Giles: chih4
- Cantonese Yale: jaai6, ji6
- Jyutping: zaai6, zi6
- Japanese Kana: チ chi / タイ tai (on'yomi) とける tokeru (kun'yomi)
- Sino-Korean: 치 chi

Names
- Japanese name(s): 貉偏/むじなへん mujinahen
- Hangul: 발 없는 벌레 bal eomneun beolle

Stroke order animation

Radical 153 or radical badger (豸部), which means badger, is one of the 20 Kangxi radicals (214 radicals in total) composed of 7 strokes. In the Kangxi Dictionary, there are 140 characters (out of 49,030) to be found under this radical. 豸 is also the 162nd indexing component in the Table of Indexing Chinese Character Components predominantly adopted by Simplified Chinese dictionaries published in mainland China. It can also function as an independent Hanzi.

== Evolution ==
Oracle bone script character

Bronze script character

Qin slip script

Large seal script character

Small seal script character

== Derived characters ==
Strokes	Characters
+0	豸
+3	豹 豺 豻
+4	豼 豽
+5	豾 豿 貀 貁 貂 貃
+6	貄 貅 貆 貇 貈 貉 貊
+7	貋 (=豻) 貌 貍
+8	貎 貏
+9	貐 貑 貒 貓
+10	貔 貕 貖
+11	貗 貘 貙
+12	貚
+18	貛 (=獾 -> 犬)
+20	貜

== Literature ==
- Fazzioli, Edoardo (1987). Chinese calligraphy : from pictograph to ideogram : the history of 214 essential Chinese/Japanese characters. calligraphy by Rebecca Hon Ko. New York: Abbeville Press. ISBN 0-89659-774-1.
- Lunde, Ken (Jan 5, 2009). "Appendix J: Japanese Character Sets" (PDF). CJKV Information Processing: Chinese, Japanese, Korean & Vietnamese Computing (Second ed.). Sebastopol, Calif.: O'Reilly Media. ISBN 978-0-596-51447-1.
