= Radical 48 =

Kangxi radical

工
- Radical 48 (U+2F2F)
- 工 (U+5DE5) "work"

Pronunciations
- Pinyin: gōng
- Bopomofo: ㄍㄨㄥ
- Wade–Giles: kung1
- Cantonese Yale: gūng
- Jyutping: gung1
- Pe̍h-ōe-jī: kong
- Japanese Kana: コウ kō (on'yomi) たくみ takumi (kun'yomi)
- Sino-Korean: 공 gong

Names
- Chinese name(s): 工字旁 gōngzìpáng
- Japanese name(s): 工/こう kō 工/たくみ takumi 工偏/たくみへん takumihen エ/え e
- Hangul: 장인 jang'in

Stroke order animation

Radical 48 or radical work (工部) meaning "work" is one of the 31 Kangxi radicals (214 radicals total) composed of three strokes.

In the Kangxi Dictionary, there are 17 characters (out of 49,030) to be found under this radical.

工 is also the 28th indexing component in the Table of Indexing Chinese Character Components predominantly adopted by Simplified Chinese dictionaries published in mainland China.

== Evolution ==
=== 工 ===
Oracle bone script

Bronze script

Chu slip and silk script

Large seal script

Small seal script

=== 巨 ===
Originally meant carpenter's square (矩).

Bronze script

Large seal script

Small seal script

=== 巫 ===
Oracle bone script

Bronze script

Chu slip and silk script

Qin slip script

Shuowen ancient script

Large seal script

Small seal script

== Derived characters ==
Strokes	Characters
+0	工
+2	左 巧 巨
+3	巩 (also SC form of 鞏 -> Radical 177) 巪^{KO}
+4	巫
+6	差^{SC variant}
+7	差^{TC/JP/KO variant}
+9	巯^{SC} (=巰)
+10	巰

== Sinogram ==
The radical is also used as an independent Chinese character. It is one of the kyōiku kanji or kanji taught in elementary school in Japan. It is a second grade kanji.

== Literature ==
- Fazzioli, Edoardo (1987). Chinese calligraphy : from pictograph to ideogram : the history of 214 essential Chinese/Japanese characters. calligraphy by Rebecca Hon Ko. New York: Abbeville Press. ISBN 0-89659-774-1.
- Lunde, Ken (Jan 5, 2009). "Appendix J: Japanese Character Sets" (PDF). CJKV Information Processing: Chinese, Japanese, Korean & Vietnamese Computing (Second ed.). Sebastopol, Calif.: O'Reilly Media. ISBN 978-0-596-51447-1.
