= Radical 189 =

Chinese character radical

高
- Radical 189 (U+2FBC)
- 高 (U+9AD8) "tall"

Pronunciations
- Pinyin: gāo
- Bopomofo: ㄍㄠ
- Wade–Giles: kao1
- Cantonese Yale: gou1
- Jyutping: gou1
- Japanese Kana: コウ kō (on'yomi) たか-い taka-i / たか taka / たか-まる taka-maru / たか-める taka-meru (kun'yomi)
- Sino-Korean: 고 go
- Hán-Việt: cao

Names
- Japanese name(s): 高い/たかい takai
- Hangul: 높을 nopeul

Stroke order animation

Radical 189 or radical tall (高部) meaning "tall" is one of the 8 Kangxi radicals (214 radicals in total) composed of 10 strokes.

In the Kangxi Dictionary, there are 34 characters (out of 49,030) to be found under this radical.

高 is also the 191st indexing component in the Table of Indexing Chinese Character Components predominantly adopted by Simplified Chinese dictionaries published in mainland China.

== Evolution ==
Shang dynasty Oracle bone script

Shang dynasty Bronze script

Western Zhou Bronze script

Spring and Autumn period bronze script

Warring States period bronze script

Chu slip and silk script

Qin slip script

Large seal script character

Small seal script character

== Derived characters ==
Strokes	Characters
+0	高 髙 (=高)
+4	髚
+5	髛
+8	髜
+12	髝
+13	髞

== Sinogram ==
The radical is also used as an independent Chinese character. It is one of the kyōiku kanji or kanji taught in elementary school in Japan. It is a second grade kanji.

== Literature ==
- Fazzioli, Edoardo (1987). Chinese calligraphy : from pictograph to ideogram : the history of 214 essential Chinese/Japanese characters. calligraphy by Rebecca Hon Ko. New York: Abbeville Press. ISBN 0-89659-774-1.
- Lunde, Ken (Jan 5, 2009). "Appendix J: Japanese Character Sets" (PDF). CJKV Information Processing: Chinese, Japanese, Korean & Vietnamese Computing (Second ed.). Sebastopol, Calif.: O'Reilly Media. ISBN 978-0-596-51447-1.
