= Radical 204 =

Chinese character radical

黹
- Radical 204 (U+2FCB)
- 黹 (U+9EF9) "embroidery, needlework"

Pronunciations
- Pinyin: zhǐ
- Bopomofo: ㄓˇ
- Wade–Giles: chih3
- Cantonese Yale: ji2
- Jyutping: zi2
- Japanese Kana: チ chi ぬいとり nuitori
- Sino-Korean: 치 chi
- Hán-Việt: chỉ

Names
- Japanese name(s): 黹偏 futsuhen (ふつへん)
- Hangul: 바느질할치 baneujilhal

Stroke order animation

Radical 204 or radical embroidery (黹部) meaning "embroidery" or "needlework" is 1 of 4 Kangxi radicals (214 radicals total) composed of 12 strokes.

In the Kangxi Dictionary there are only eight characters (out of 49,030) to be found under this radical.

== Evolution ==
Shang dynasty Oracle bone script

Western Zhou Bronze script

Large seal script character

Small seal script character

== Characters with Radical 204 ==
Strokes	Characters
+0	黹
+4	黺
+5	黻
+7	黼

== Literature ==
- Fazzioli, Edoardo (1987). Chinese calligraphy : from pictograph to ideogram : the history of 214 essential Chinese/Japanese characters. calligraphy by Rebecca Hon Ko. New York: Abbeville Press. ISBN 0-89659-774-1.
- Lunde, Ken (Jan 5, 2009). "Appendix J: Japanese Character Sets" (PDF). CJKV Information Processing: Chinese, Japanese, Korean & Vietnamese Computing (Second ed.). Sebastopol, Calif.: O'Reilly Media. ISBN 978-0-596-51447-1.
