= 弓 (disambiguation) =

弓 is Kangxi radical 57, used in Chinese characters to represent an archery bow.

弓 may also refer to:

- Gakgung (角弓), a Korean archery bow
- Gong (surname) (弓), a Chinese surname
- Kokyū (胡弓), a traditional Japanese string instrument
- Long bow (弓), a piece in Ko shogi, a variant of Japanese chess
- Yumi (弓), a Japanese archery bow
