= Radical 101 =

Chinese character radical

用
- Radical 101 (U+2F64)
- 用 (U+7528) "use"

Pronunciations
- Pinyin: yòng
- Bopomofo: ㄩㄥˋ
- Wade–Giles: yung4
- Cantonese Yale: yung6
- Jyutping: jung6
- Japanese Kana: ヨウ yō / ユウ yū (on'yomi) もち-いる mochiiru (kun'yomi)
- Sino-Korean: 용 yong

Names
- Japanese name(s): 用/もちいる mochiiru
- Hangul: 쓸 sseul

Stroke order animation

Radical 101 or radical use (用部) meaning "use" is one of the 23 Kangxi radicals (214 radicals in total) composed of 5 strokes.

In the Kangxi Dictionary, there are 10 characters (out of 49,030) to be found under this radical.

== Evolution ==
Shang dynasty Oracle bone script

Shang dynasty Bronze script

Western Zhou Bronze script

Spring and Autumn period bronze script

Warring States period bronze script

Chu slip and silk script

Qin slip script

Shuowen ancient script

Large seal script character

Small seal script character

Han dynasty Clerical script

== Derived characters ==
Strokes	Characters
+0	用 甩
+1	甪
+2	甫 甬
+4	甭 甮
+7	甯 (=寧 -> 宀)

== Sinogram ==
The radical is also used as an independent Chinese character. It is one of the kyōiku kanji or kanji taught in elementary school in Japan. It is a second grade kanji.

== Literature ==
- Fazzioli, Edoardo (1987). Chinese calligraphy : from pictograph to ideogram : the history of 214 essential Chinese/Japanese characters. calligraphy by Rebecca Hon Ko. New York: Abbeville Press. ISBN 0-89659-774-1.
- Lunde, Ken (Jan 5, 2009). "Appendix J: Japanese Character Sets" (PDF). CJKV Information Processing: Chinese, Japanese, Korean & Vietnamese Computing (Second ed.). Sebastopol, Calif.: O'Reilly Media. ISBN 978-0-596-51447-1.
