= Radical 185 =

Chinese character radical

首
- Radical 185 (U+2FB8)
- 首 (U+9996) "head"

Pronunciations
- Pinyin: shǒu
- Bopomofo: ㄕㄡˇ
- Wade–Giles: shou3
- Cantonese Yale: sau2
- Jyutping: sau2
- Japanese Kana: シュ shu / シュウ shū (on'yomi) くび kubi (kun'yomi)
- Sino-Korean: 수 su
- Hán-Việt: thủ, thú

Names
- Japanese name(s): 首/くび kubi
- Hangul: 머리 meori

Stroke order animation

Radical 185 or radical head (首部) meaning "head" is one of the 11 Kangxi radicals (214 radicals in total) composed of 9 strokes.

In the Kangxi Dictionary, there are 20 characters (out of 49,030) to be found under this radical.

首 is also the 187th indexing component in the Table of Indexing Chinese Character Components predominantly adopted by Simplified Chinese dictionaries published in mainland China.

== Evolution ==
Oracle bone script character

Bronze script character

Large seal script character

Small seal script character

== Derived characters ==
| Strokes | Characters |
|---|---|
| +0 | 首 |
| +2 | 馗 |
| +8 | 馘 |

== Sinogram ==
The radical is also used as an independent Chinese character. It is one of the Kyōiku kanji or Kanji taught in elementary school in Japan. It is a second grade kanji.

== Literature ==
- Fazzioli, Edoardo (1987). Chinese calligraphy : from pictograph to ideogram : the history of 214 essential Chinese/Japanese characters. calligraphy by Rebecca Hon Ko. New York: Abbeville Press. ISBN 0-89659-774-1.
- Lunde, Ken (Jan 5, 2009). "Appendix J: Japanese Character Sets" (PDF). CJKV Information Processing: Chinese, Japanese, Korean & Vietnamese Computing (Second ed.). Sebastopol, Calif.: O'Reilly Media. ISBN 978-0-596-51447-1.
