= Radical 171 =

Chinese character radical

隶
- Radical 171 (U+2FAA)
- 隶 (U+96B6) "slave"

Pronunciations
- Pinyin: lì
- Bopomofo: ㄌㄧˋ
- Wade–Giles: li4
- Cantonese Yale: dai6
- Jyutping: dai6
- Japanese Kana: タイ tai (on'yomi) およ-ぶ oyo-bu (kun'yomi)
- Sino-Korean: 이 i, 대 dae, 례 rye, 예 ye
- Hán-Việt: đãi, lệ

Names
- Japanese name(s): 隷旁/れいづくり reizukuri
- Hangul: 미칠 michil; 종 jong

Stroke order animation

Radical 171 or radical slave (隶部) meaning "slave" is one of the 9 Kangxi radicals (214 radicals in total) composed of 8 strokes.

In the Kangxi Dictionary, there are 12 characters (out of 49,030) to be found under this radical.

隶 is also the 178th indexing component in the Table of Indexing Chinese Character Components predominantly adopted by Simplified Chinese dictionaries published in mainland China.

隶 is the original form of 逮. It is also used as the simplified form of 隸 in Simplified Chinese.

== Evolution ==
Small seal script character

== Derived characters ==
Strokes	Characters
+0	隶 (also SC form of 隸)
+8	隷^{JP} (=隸)
+9	隸

== Literature ==
- Fazzioli, Edoardo (1987). Chinese calligraphy : from pictograph to ideogram : the history of 214 essential Chinese/Japanese characters. calligraphy by Rebecca Hon Ko. New York: Abbeville Press. ISBN 0-89659-774-1.
- Lunde, Ken (Jan 5, 2009). "Appendix J: Japanese Character Sets" (PDF). CJKV Information Processing: Chinese, Japanese, Korean & Vietnamese Computing (Second ed.). Sebastopol, Calif.: O'Reilly Media. ISBN 978-0-596-51447-1.
