= Radical 39 =

Chinese character radical

子
- Radical 39 (U+2F26)
- 子 (U+5B50) "child, seed"

Pronunciations
- Pinyin: zǐ
- Bopomofo: ㄗˇ
- Gwoyeu Romatzyh: tzyy
- Wade–Giles: tzŭ^{3}
- Cantonese Yale: jí
- Jyutping: zi2
- Pe̍h-ōe-jī: chú
- Japanese Kana: シ shi (on'yomi) こ ko (kun'yomi)
- Sino-Korean: 자 ja

Names
- Chinese name(s): (Left) 子字旁 zǐzìpáng (Bottom) 子字底 zǐzìdǐ
- Japanese name(s): 子偏/こへん kohen 子供/こども kodomo 子供偏/こどもへん kodomohen 捨て子偏/すてごへん sutegohen
- Hangul: 아들, 알 · adeul, ssi

Stroke order animation

Radical 39 or radical child (子部) meaning "child" or "seed" is one of the 31 Kangxi radicals (214 radicals total) composed of three strokes.

In the Kangxi Dictionary, there are 83 characters (out of 49,030) to be found under this radical.

子 is also the 54th indexing component in the Table of Indexing Chinese Character Components predominantly adopted by Simplified Chinese dictionaries published in mainland China.

In Chinese astrology, 子 represents the first Earthly Branch and corresponds to the Rat in the Chinese zodiac.

== Evolution ==
=== 子 ===
Oracle bone script character

Bronze script character

Chu slip and silk script

Large seal script character

Small seal script character

Compare 了. 子 upside-down is 𠫓.

=== 孑 ===
Large seal script character

Small seal script character

== Derived characters ==
Strokes	Characters
+0	子 孑 孒 孓
+1	孔
+2	孕
+3	孖 字 存 孙^{SC} (=孫)
+4	孚 孛 孜 孝 孞 斈 (=學)
+5	孟 孠 (=嗣 -> 口) 孡 孢 季 孤 孥 学^{SC/JP} (=學) 孧
+6	孨 孩 孪^{SC} (=孿)
+7	孫 孬 孭
+8	孮 孯 孰 孲
+9	孱
+10	孳 孴 孶 (=孳)
+11	孵 孷
+13	學 孹
+14	孺 孻
+16	孼 (=孽)
+17	孽 孾
+19	孿

== Sinogram ==
The radical is also used as an independent Chinese character. It is one of the kyōiku kanji or kanji taught in elementary school in Japan. It is a first grade kanji.

== Literature ==
- Fazzioli, Edoardo (1987). Chinese calligraphy : from pictograph to ideogram : the history of 214 essential Chinese/Japanese characters. calligraphy by Rebecca Hon Ko. New York: Abbeville Press. ISBN 0-89659-774-1.
- Lunde, Ken (Jan 5, 2009). "Appendix J: Japanese Character Sets" (PDF). CJKV Information Processing: Chinese, Japanese, Korean & Vietnamese Computing (Second ed.). Sebastopol, Calif.: O'Reilly Media. ISBN 978-0-596-51447-1.
