= Radical 133 =

Chinese character radical

至
- Radical 133 (U+2F84)
- 至 (U+81F3) "arrive"

Pronunciations
- Pinyin: zhì
- Bopomofo: ㄓˋ
- Gwoyeu Romatzyh: jyh
- Wade–Giles: chih^{4}
- Cantonese Yale: ji
- Jyutping: zi3
- Japanese Kana: シ shi (on'yomi) いた-る ita-ru (kun'yomi)
- Sino-Korean: 지 ji

Names
- Japanese name(s): 至/いたる itaru (Left) 至偏/いたるへん itaruhen
- Hangul: 이를 ireul

Stroke order animation

Radical 133 or radical arrive (至部) meaning "arrive" or "most" is one of the 29 Kangxi radicals (214 radicals in total) composed of 6 strokes.

In the Kangxi Dictionary, there are 24 characters (out of 49,030) to be found under this radical.

至 is also the 129 indexing component in the Table of Indexing Chinese Character Components predominantly adopted by Simplified Chinese dictionaries published in mainland China.

== Evolution ==
矢 ("arrow") upside-down stuck into the ground.

Oracle bone script character

Bronze script character

Large seal script character

Small seal script character

== Derived characters ==
Strokes	Characters
+0	至
+4	致
+6	臵 臶 臷 臸
+7	臹
+8	臺
+10	臻

== Sinogram ==
The radical is also used as an independent Chinese character. It is one of the Kyōiku kanji or Kanji taught in elementary school in Japan. It is a fifth grade kanji.

== Literature ==
- Fazzioli, Edoardo (1987). Chinese calligraphy : from pictograph to ideogram : the history of 214 essential Chinese/Japanese characters. calligraphy by Rebecca Hon Ko. New York: Abbeville Press. ISBN 0-89659-774-1.
