= Radical 202 =

Chinese character radical

黍
- Radical 202 (U+2FC9)
- 黍 (U+9ECD) "millet"

Pronunciations
- Pinyin: shǔ
- Bopomofo: ㄕㄨˇ
- Wade–Giles: shu3
- Cantonese Yale: syu2
- Jyutping: syu2
- Japanese Kana: ショ sho (on'yomi) きび kibi (kun'yomi)
- Sino-Korean: 서 seo
- Hán-Việt: thử

Names
- Japanese name(s): 黍/きび kibi
- Hangul: 기장 gijang

Stroke order animation

Radical 202 or radical millet (黍部) meaning "millet" is one of the 4 Kangxi radicals (214 radicals in total) composed of 12 strokes.

In the Kangxi Dictionary, there are 46 characters (out of 49,030) to be found under this radical.

黍 is also the 197th indexing component in the Table of Indexing Chinese Character Components predominantly adopted by Simplified Chinese dictionaries published in mainland China.

== Evolution ==
Oracle bone script character

Bronze script character

Large seal script character

Small seal script character

== Derived characters ==
Strokes	Characters
+0	黍
+3	黎
+5	黏
+10	黐

== Literature ==
- Fazzioli, Edoardo (1987). Chinese calligraphy : from pictograph to ideogram : the history of 214 essential Chinese/Japanese characters. calligraphy by Rebecca Hon Ko. New York: Abbeville Press. ISBN 0-89659-774-1.
- Lunde, Ken (Jan 5, 2009). "Appendix J: Japanese Character Sets" (PDF). CJKV Information Processing: Chinese, Japanese, Korean & Vietnamese Computing (Second ed.). Sebastopol, Calif.: O'Reilly Media. ISBN 978-0-596-51447-1.
