= Radical 152 =

Chinese character radical

豕
- Radical 152 (U+2F97)
- 豕 (U+8C55) "pig"

Pronunciations
- Pinyin: shǐ
- Bopomofo: ㄕˇ
- Wade–Giles: shih3
- Cantonese Yale: chi2
- Jyutping: ci2
- Japanese Kana: シ shi (on'yomi) ぶた buta / いのこ inoko (kun'yomi)
- Sino-Korean: 시 si

Names
- Japanese name(s): 豕/いのこ inoko 豕偏/いのこへん inokohen
- Hangul: 돼지 dwaeji

Stroke order animation

Radical 152 or radical pig (豕部) meaning "pig" is one of the 20 Kangxi radicals (214 radicals in total) composed of 7 strokes.

In the Kangxi Dictionary, there are 148 characters (out of 49,030) to be found under this radical.

豕 is also the 155th indexing component in the Table of Indexing Chinese Character Components predominantly adopted by Simplified Chinese dictionaries published in mainland China.

== Evolution ==
Oracle bone script character

Shang dynasty Bronze script

Western Zhou Bronze script

Large seal script character

Small seal script character

== Derived characters ==
Strokes	Characters
+0	豕
+1	豖
+3	豗
+4	豘 (=豚) 豙 豚 豛 豜 豝
+5	豞 豟 豠 象
+6	豢 豣 (=豜) 豤 豥 豦
+7	豧 豨 豩 豪
+9	豫 豬 豭 豮^{SC} (=豶)
+10	豯 豰 豱 豲 豳
+11	豴 豵
+12	豷
+13	豶

== Literature ==
- Fazzioli, Edoardo (1987). Chinese calligraphy: from pictograph to ideogram: the history of 214 essential Chinese/Japanese characters. calligraphy by Rebecca Hon Ko. New York: Abbeville Press. ISBN 0-89659-774-1.
