= Radical 176 =

Chinese character radical

面
- Radical 176 (U+2FAF)
- 面 (U+9762) "face"

Pronunciations
- Pinyin: miàn
- Bopomofo: ㄇㄧㄢˋ
- Wade–Giles: mien4
- Cantonese Yale: min6
- Jyutping: min6
- Japanese Kana: メン men / ベン ben (on'yomi) おも omo / おもて omote (kun'yomi)
- Sino-Korean: 면 myeon
- Hán-Việt: diện, miến

Names
- Japanese name(s): 面/めん men
- Hangul: 낯 nat

Stroke order animation

Radical 176 or radical face (面部) meaning "face" is one of the 11 Kangxi radicals (214 radicals in total) composed of 9 strokes.

In the Kangxi Dictionary, there are 66 characters (out of 49,030) to be found under this radical.

面 is also the 180th indexing component in the Table of Indexing Chinese Character Components predominantly adopted by Simplified Chinese dictionaries published in mainland China.

In Simplified Chinese, 面 is also used as the simplified form of 麵/麪 ("noodles" or "flour").

== Evolution ==
Oracle bone script character

Small seal script character

== Derived characters ==
Strokes	Characters
+0	面 靣 (= 面)
+5	靤 (= 皰 → 皮)
+6	靥^{SC} (= 靨)
+7	靦
+12	靧
+14	靨

== Sinogram ==
The radical is also used as an independent Chinese character. It is one of the kyōiku kanji or kanji taught in elementary school in Japan. It is a third grade kanji.

== Literature ==
- Fazzioli, Edoardo (1987). Chinese calligraphy : from pictograph to ideogram : the history of 214 essential Chinese/Japanese characters. calligraphy by Rebecca Hon Ko. New York: Abbeville Press. ISBN 0-89659-774-1.
- Lunde, Ken (Jan 5, 2009). "Appendix J: Japanese Character Sets" (PDF). CJKV Information Processing: Chinese, Japanese, Korean & Vietnamese Computing (Second ed.). Sebastopol, Calif.: O'Reilly Media. ISBN 978-0-596-51447-1.
