= Radical 161 =

Chinese character radical

辰
- Radical 161 (U+2FA0)
- 辰 (U+8FB0) "morning"

Pronunciations
- Pinyin: chén
- Bopomofo: ㄔㄣˊ
- Wade–Giles: ch'en2
- Cantonese Yale: san4
- Jyutping: san4
- Japanese Kana: シン shin (on'yomi) たつ tatsu (kun'yomi)
- Sino-Korean: 신 sin
- Hán-Việt: thần

Names
- Japanese name(s): しんのたつ shinnotatsu
- Hangul: 별 byeol

Stroke order animation

Radical 161 or radical morning (辰部) meaning "morning" is one of the 20 Kangxi radicals (214 radicals in total) composed of 7 strokes.

In the Kangxi Dictionary, there are 15 characters (out of 49,030) to be found under this radical.

In Chinese astrology, 辰 represents the fifth Earthly Branch and corresponds to the Dragon in the Chinese zodiac.

辰 is also the 154th indexing component in the Table of Indexing Chinese Character Components predominantly adopted by Simplified Chinese dictionaries published in mainland China.

== Evolution ==
Oracle bone script character

Bronze script character

Large seal script character

Small seal script character

== Derived characters ==
Strokes	Characters
+0	辰
+3	辱
+6	農
+8	辳 (=農)
+12	辴

== Literature ==
- Fazzioli, Edoardo (1987). Chinese calligraphy : from pictograph to ideogram : the history of 214 essential Chinese/Japanese characters. calligraphy by Rebecca Hon Ko. New York: Abbeville Press. ISBN 0-89659-774-1.
- Lunde, Ken (Jan 5, 2009). "Appendix J: Japanese Character Sets" (PDF). CJKV Information Processing: Chinese, Japanese, Korean & Vietnamese Computing (Second ed.). Sebastopol, Calif.: O'Reilly Media. ISBN 978-0-596-51447-1.
