= Radical 31 =

Chinese character radical

囗
- Radical 31 (U+2F1E)
- 囗 (U+56D7) "enclosure"

Pronunciations
- Pinyin: wéi
- Bopomofo: ㄨㄟˊ
- Gwoyeu Romatzyh: wei
- Wade–Giles: wei^{2}
- Cantonese Yale: wàih
- Jyutping: wai4
- Pe̍h-ōe-jī: ûi
- Sino-Korean: 위 wi
- Hán-Việt: Vi

Names
- Chinese name(s): 國字框/国字框 guózìkuàng 大口框 dàkǒukuàng
- Japanese name(s): 国構 kunigamae
- Hangul: 에운담 eundam

Stroke order animation

Radical 31 or radical enclosure (囗部) is one of the 31 Kangxi radicals (214 radicals total) composed of three strokes.

In the Kangxi Dictionary, there are 118 characters (out of 49,030) to be found under this radical.

囗 is also the 38th indexing component in the Table of Indexing Chinese Character Components predominantly adopted by Simplified Chinese dictionaries published in mainland China.

== Evolution ==
Unrelated to 口 ("mouth")

Oracle bone script character

Bronze script character

Large seal script character

Small seal script character

== Derived characters ==
Strokes	Characters
+0	囗 〇
+2	囙 (=因) 囚 四 囜
+3	囝 回 囟 因 囡 团^{SC} (=團) 団^{JP} (=團)
+4	囤 囥 囦 囧 囨 囩 囪 囫 囬 (=回) 园^{SC} (=園) 囮 囯 (=國) 困 囱 囲^{JP} (=圍) 図^{SC} (=圖) 围^{SC} (=圍) 囵^{SC} (=圇) 囶 囷 囸
+5	囹 固 囻 囼 国^{SC/JP} (=國) 图^{SC} (=圖)
+6	囿 圀
+7	圁 圂 圃 圄 圅 (=函) 圆^{SC} (=圓)
+8	圇 圈 圉 圊 國
+9	圌 圍 圎 (=圓) 圏^{JP} (=圈) 圐
+10	圑 園 圓 圔 圕
+11	圖 圗 (=圖) 團 圙
+12	圚
+13	圛 圜
+19	圝
+23	圞

== Literature ==
- Fazzioli, Edoardo (1987). Chinese calligraphy : from pictograph to ideogram : the history of 214 essential Chinese/Japanese characters. calligraphy by Rebecca Hon Ko. New York: Abbeville Press. ISBN 0-89659-774-1.
- Lunde, Ken (Jan 5, 2009). "Appendix J: Japanese Character Sets" (PDF). CJKV Information Processing: Chinese, Japanese, Korean & Vietnamese Computing (Second ed.). Sebastopol, Calif.: O'Reilly Media. ISBN 978-0-596-51447-1.
