= Radical 205 =

Chinese character radical

黽
- Radical 205 (U+2FCC)
- 黽 (U+9EFD) "frog, amphibian"

Pronunciations
- Pinyin: mǐn
- Bopomofo: ㄇㄧㄣˇ
- Wade–Giles: min3
- Cantonese Yale: man5
- Jyutping: man5
- Japanese Kana: ベン, ボー ben, bō つとめる tsutomeru
- Sino-Korean: 맹 maeng
- Hán-Việt: mãnh

Names
- Japanese name(s): 黽足 benashi (べんあし)
- Hangul: 맹꽁이 maengkkongi

Stroke order animation

Radical 205 meaning "frog" or "amphibian" (黽部) is 1 of 4 Kangxi radicals (214 radicals total) composed of 13 strokes.

In the Kangxi Dictionary there are 40 characters (out of 49,030) to be found under this radical.

== Evolution ==
Shang dynasty Oracle bone script

Shang dynasty Bronze script

Western Zhou Bronze script

Large seal script character

Small seal script character

== Characters with Radical 205 ==
strokes	character
+0	黽 黾
+4	黿
+5	鼀 鼁 鼂
+6	鼃 鼄
+8	鼅
+10	鼆
+11	鼇
+12	鼈 鼉 鼊

== Literature ==
- Fazzioli, Edoardo (1987). Chinese calligraphy : from pictograph to ideogram : the history of 214 essential Chinese/Japanese characters. calligraphy by Rebecca Hon Ko. New York: Abbeville Press. ISBN 0-89659-774-1.
