= Radical 43 =

Chinese character radical

尢
- Radical 43 (U+2F2A)
- 尢 (U+5C22) "lame"

Pronunciations
- Pinyin: wāng
- Bopomofo: ㄨㄤ
- Wade–Giles: wang1
- Cantonese Yale: wōng
- Jyutping: wong1
- Pe̍h-ōe-jī: ong
- Japanese Kana: オウ ō (on'yomi)
- Sino-Korean: 왕 wang

Names
- Chinese name(s): 尤字旁 yóuzìpáng
- Japanese name(s): 曲足/まげあし mageashi 大の曲足/だいのまげあし dainomageashi 尢繞/おうにょう ōnyō
- Hangul: 절음발이 jeoreumbari

Stroke order animation

Radical 43 or radical lame (尢部) meaning "lame" is one of the 31 Kangxi radicals (214 radicals total) composed of three strokes.

In the Kangxi Dictionary, there are 66 characters (out of 49,030) to be found under this radical.

尢 is also the 34th indexing component in the Table of Indexing Chinese Character Components predominantly adopted by Simplified Chinese dictionaries published in mainland China. 兀 and 尣 are the two associated indexing components affiliated to the principal indexing component 尢.

== Evolution ==
Man (大) with bent leg.

Oracle bone script

Bronze script

Shuowen ancient script

Small seal script

=== 尤 ===
Hand with a wart.

Oracle bone script

Bronze script

Large seal script

Small seal script

== Derived characters ==
| Strokes | Characters |
|---|---|
| +0 | 尢 尣 |
| +1 | 尤 |
| +3 | 尥 尦 |
| +4 | 尨 尩 尪 尫 尬 |
| +6 | 尮 尯 |
| +9 | 尰 就 |
| +10 | 尲 尳 尴^{SC} (=尷) |
| +12 | 尵 |
| +14 | 尶 尷 |

== Literature ==
- Fazzioli, Edoardo (1987). Chinese calligraphy : from pictograph to ideogram : the history of 214 essential Chinese/Japanese characters. calligraphy by Rebecca Hon Ko. New York: Abbeville Press. ISBN 0-89659-774-1.
- Lunde, Ken (Jan 5, 2009). "Appendix J: Japanese Character Sets" (PDF). CJKV Information Processing: Chinese, Japanese, Korean & Vietnamese Computing (Second ed.). Sebastopol, Calif.: O'Reilly Media. ISBN 978-0-596-51447-1.
