= Radical 23 =

Chinese character radical

匸
- Radical 23 (U+2F16)
- 匸 (U+5338) "hiding enclosure"

Pronunciations
- Pinyin: xì
- Bopomofo: ㄒㄧˋ
- Gwoyeu Romatzyh: shih
- Wade–Giles: hsi^{4}
- Cantonese Yale: hái
- Jyutping: hai2
- Japanese Kana: ケイ kē (on'yomi) かくす kakusu (kun'yomi)
- Sino-Korean: 혜 hye
- Hán-Việt: hệ

Names
- Chinese name(s): 區字框/区字框 qūzìkuàng
- Japanese name(s): 隠構/匸構/かくしがまえ kakushigamae
- Hangul: 감출 gamchul

Stroke order animation

Radical 23 or radical hiding enclosure (匸部) is one of the 23 Kangxi radicals (214 radicals total) composed of two strokes.

In the Kangxi Dictionary, there are 17 characters (out of 49,030) to be found under this radical.

In Traditional Chinese used in Taiwan, Hong Kong and Macau, radical 23 (hiding enclosure, 匸), whose second stroke starts is a bit right to the starting point of the first stroke, is slightly different from radical 22 (right open box, 匚).

In mainland China, radical 22 and 23 were unified as right open box 匚, and the nuance, as well as radical hiding enclosure, no longer exists in Simplified Chinese characters. This merger also applies to Traditional Chinese characters in China's GB character set.

A similar merger was also made in Japanese kanji, including their kyūjitai forms in JIS X 0208 character set. Some Japanese dictionaries keep the two radicals in their indexes, but they both lead to the same merged radical.

== Evolution ==
=== 匸 ===
Unrelated to 匚, hangul ㄷ and katakana コ.

Shang dynasty Oracle bone script

Western Zhou Bronze script

Chu slip and silk script

Large seal script character

Small seal script character

=== 亡 ===
A line on 刀.

Shang dynasty Oracle bone script

Shang dynasty bronze script

Western Zhou bronze script

Chu slip and silk script

Large seal script character

Small seal script character

== Derived characters ==
Strokes	Characters
+0	匸
+2	匹 区^{SC/JP} (=區)
+6	匼
+7	匽
+9	匾 匿 區

== Literature ==
- Fazzioli, Edoardo (1987). Chinese calligraphy : from pictograph to ideogram : the history of 214 essential Chinese/Japanese characters. calligraphy by Rebecca Hon Ko. New York: Abbeville Press. ISBN 0-89659-774-1.
- Lunde, Ken (Jan 5, 2009). "Appendix J: Japanese Character Sets" (PDF). CJKV Information Processing: Chinese, Japanese, Korean & Vietnamese Computing (Second ed.). Sebastopol, Calif.: O'Reilly Media. ISBN 978-0-596-51447-1.`
