= Radical 7 =

Chinese character radical

二
- Radical 7 (U+2F06)
- 二 (U+4E8C) "two"

Pronunciations
- Pinyin: èr
- Bopomofo: ㄦˋ
- Gwoyeu Romatzyh: ell
- Wade–Giles: êrh^{4}
- Cantonese Yale: yih
- Jyutping: ji6
- Pe̍h-ōe-jī: jī
- Japanese Kana: ニ ni (on'yomi) ふた(つ) futa(tsu) (kun'yomi)
- Sino-Korean: 이 i
- Hán-Việt: nhị

Names
- Hangul: 두 du

Stroke order animation

Radical 7 or radical two (二部) which means "two" is one of 23 of the 214 Kangxi radicals that are composed of 2 strokes. In the Kangxi Dictionary, there are 29 characters (out of 49,030) to be found under this radical. In Simplified Chinese dictionaries and some Hong Kong Traditional Chinese dictionaries, radical 7 (radical two) is merged with radical 1 (Radical one, 一).

== Evolution ==
Shang dynasty Oracle bone script

Western Zhou Bronze script

Spring and Autumn period bronze script

Warring States period bronze script

Chu slip and silk script

Qin slip script

Large seal script character

Small seal script character

Qing dynasty Clerical script

== Derived characters ==
Strokes	Characters
+0	二
+1	亍 于 亏
+2	云 互 亓 五 井 亖
+3	亗
+4	亚 亘 亙
+5	些 亜
+6	亝 亞 亟 㐩

== Literature ==
- Fazzioli, Edoardo (1987). Chinese calligraphy : from pictograph to ideogram : the history of 214 essential Chinese/Japanese characters. calligraphy by Rebecca Hon Ko. New York: Abbeville Press. ISBN 0-89659-774-1.
- Leyi Li: “Tracing the Roots of Chinese Characters: 500 Cases”. Beijing 1993, ISBN 978-7-5619-0204-2

== Hanzi ==
This radical is a Hanzi and a first-grade Kyōiku kanji.

== See also ==
- Chinese numerals
