= Radical 110 =

Chinese character radical

矛
- Radical 110 (U+2F6D)
- 矛 (U+77DB) "spear"

Pronunciations
- Pinyin: máo
- Bopomofo: ㄇㄠˊ
- Wade–Giles: mao2
- Cantonese Yale: maau4
- Jyutping: maau4
- Japanese Kana: ボウ bō / ム mu (on'yomi) ほこ hoko (kun'yomi)
- Sino-Korean: 모 mo

Names
- Chinese name(s): 矛字旁 máozìpáng
- Japanese name(s): 矛/ほこ hoko 矛偏/ほこへん hokohen
- Hangul: 창 chang

Stroke order animation

Radical 110 or radical spear (矛部) meaning "spear" is one of the 23 Kangxi radicals (214 radicals in total) composed of 5 strokes.

In the Kangxi Dictionary, there are 65 characters (out of 49,030) to be found under this radical.

矛 is also the 121st indexing component in the Table of Indexing Chinese Character Components predominantly adopted by Simplified Chinese dictionaries published in mainland China.

== Evolution ==
Unrelated to 予.

Bronze script character

Large seal script character

Small seal script character

== Derived characters ==
Strokes	Characters
+0	矛
+4	矜
+5	矝
+7	矞 矟
+8	矠
+20	矡

== Literature ==
- Fazzioli, Edoardo (1987). Chinese calligraphy : from pictograph to ideogram : the history of 214 essential Chinese/Japanese characters. calligraphy by Rebecca Hon Ko. New York: Abbeville Press. ISBN 0-89659-774-1.
- Lunde, Ken (Jan 5, 2009). "Appendix J: Japanese Character Sets" (PDF). CJKV Information Processing: Chinese, Japanese, Korean & Vietnamese Computing (Second ed.). Sebastopol, Calif.: O'Reilly Media. ISBN 978-0-596-51447-1.
