= Radical 179 =

Chinese character radical

韭
- Radical 179 (U+2FB2)
- 韭 (U+97ED) "leek"

Pronunciations
- Pinyin: jiǔ
- Bopomofo: ㄐㄧㄡˇ
- Wade–Giles: chiu3
- Cantonese Yale: gau2
- Jyutping: gau2
- Japanese Kana: キュウ kyū (on'yomi) にら nira (kun'yomi)
- Sino-Korean: 구 gu
- Hán-Việt: cửu

Names
- Japanese name(s): 韭/にら nira
- Hangul: 부추 buchu

Stroke order animation

Radical 179 or radical leek (韭部) meaning "leek" is one of the 11 Kangxi radicals (214 radicals in total) composed of 9 strokes.

In the Kangxi Dictionary, there are 20 characters (out of 49,030) to be found under this radical.

韭 is also the 181st indexing component in the Table of Indexing Chinese Character Components predominantly adopted by Simplified Chinese dictionaries published in mainland China.

== Evolution ==
Small seal script character

== Derived characters ==
Strokes	Characters
+0	韭
+4	韮 (=韭)
+6	韯
+7	韰
+8	韱
+10	韲 (=齏 -> 齊)

== Literature ==
- Fazzioli, Edoardo (1987). Chinese calligraphy : from pictograph to ideogram : the history of 214 essential Chinese/Japanese characters. calligraphy by Rebecca Hon Ko. New York: Abbeville Press. ISBN 0-89659-774-1.
- Lunde, Ken (Jan 5, 2009). "Appendix J: Japanese Character Sets" (PDF). CJKV Information Processing: Chinese, Japanese, Korean & Vietnamese Computing (Second ed.). Sebastopol, Calif.: O'Reilly Media. ISBN 978-0-596-51447-1.
