= Kangxi radicals =

System of Chinese character radicals

The Kangxi radicals (Chinese: 康熙部首; pinyin: Kāngxī bùshǒu), also known as Zihui radicals, are a set of 214 radicals that were collated in the 18th-century Kangxi Dictionary to aid categorization of Chinese characters. They are primarily sorted by stroke count. They are the most popular system of radicals for dictionaries that order characters by radical and stroke count. They are encoded in Unicode alongside other CJK characters, under the block "Kangxi radicals", while graphical variants are included in the block "CJK Radicals Supplement".

Originally introduced in the Zihui dictionary of 1615, they are more commonly referred to in relation to the 1716 Kangxi Dictionary—Kangxi being the commissioning emperor's era name. The 1915 encyclopedic word dictionary Ciyuan also uses this system. In modern times, many dictionaries that list Traditional Chinese head characters continue to use this system, for example the Wang Li Character Dictionary of Ancient Chinese (2000). The system of 214 Kangxi radicals is based on the older system of 540 radicals used in the Han-era Shuowen Jiezi. Since 2009, the Chinese government has promoted a 201-radical system called the Table of Indexing Chinese Character Components, as a national standard for use with simplified characters.

== Statistics ==
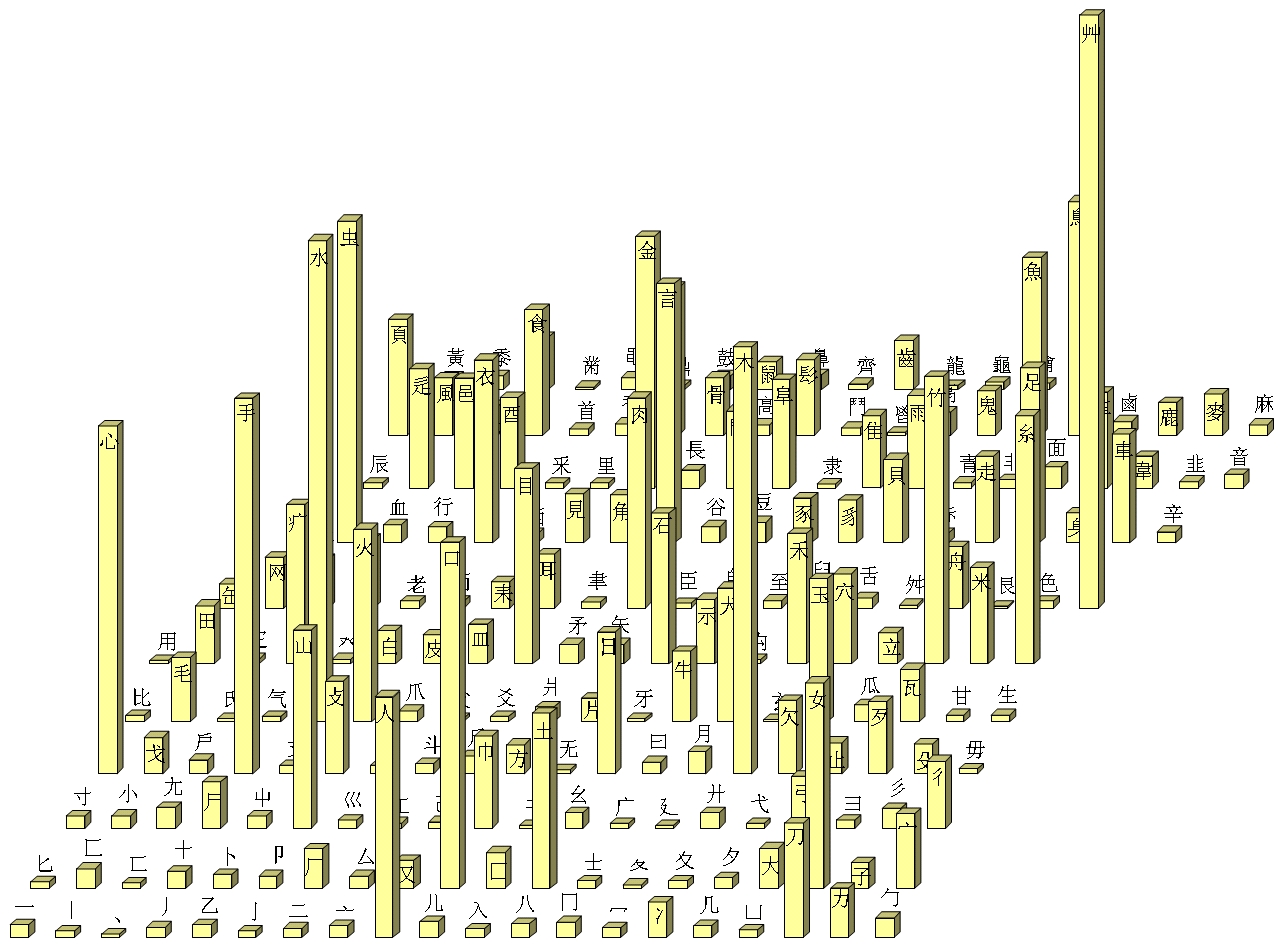
Distribution of the number of entries per radical in the Kangxi Dictionary

The Kangxi dictionary lists a total of 47,035 characters divided among the 214 radicals, for an average of 220 characters per radical; however, the distribution is unequal, with the median number of characters per radical being 64, the maximum number being 1,902 (for radical 140 艸), and the minimum being 5 (for radical 138 艮). The radicals have between one and 17 strokes, with a median of 5 strokes and an average of slightly below 5.7 strokes.

The ten radicals with the largest number of derived characters account for 10,665 characters (or 23% of the dictionary). The same ten radicals account for 7,141 out of the 20,992 characters (34%) in the Unicode CJK Unified Ideographs block as it was introduced in 1992, as follows:

Radical	Kangxi Dictionary	CJK Unified Ideographs
Radical 140 艸 "grass"	1,902 characters	981 characters (U+8278–864C)
Radical 85 水 "water"	1,595 characters	1,079 characters (U+6C34–706A)
Radical 75 木 "tree"	1,369 characters	1,016 characters (U+6728–6B1F)
Radical 64 手 "hand"	1,203 characters	740 characters (U+624B–652E)
Radical 30 口 "mouth"	1,146 characters	756 characters (U+53E3–56D6)
Radical 61 心 "heart"	1,115 characters	581 characters (U+5FC3–6207)
Radical 142 虫 "insect"	1,067 characters	469 characters (U+866B–883F)
Radical 118 竹 "bamboo"	953 characters	378 characters (U+7AF9–7C72)
Radical 149 言 "speech"	861 characters	567 characters (U+8A00–8C36)
Radical 120 糸 "silk"	823 characters	574 characters (U+7CF8–7F35)

== Modern dictionaries ==
Modern Chinese dictionaries continue to use the Kangxi radical-stroke order, both in traditional zìdiǎn (字典; 'character/logograph dictionary') for written Chinese characters and modern cídiǎn (詞典; 'word/phrase dictionary') for spoken expressions. The 214 Kangxi radicals act as a de facto standard, which may not be duplicated exactly in every Chinese dictionary, but which few dictionary compilers can afford to completely ignore. The number of radicals may be reduced in modern practical dictionaries, as some of the more obscure Kangxi radicals do not form any characters that remain in frequent use. Thus, the Oxford Concise English–Chinese Dictionary, for example, has 188 radicals. The Xinhua Zidian, a pocket-sized character dictionary containing about 13,000 characters, uses 189 radicals, later increased to 201 in its tenth edition, to conform to the national standard. A few dictionaries also introduce new radicals, treating groups of radicals that are used together in many different characters as a kind of radical. For example, Hanyu Da Cidian, the most inclusive available Chinese dictionary (1993) has 23,000 head character entries organized by a novel system of 200 radicals.

== Table ==
	Radical forms	Stroke count	Meaning	Colloquial Term	Pīnyīn	Hán-Việt	Hiragana-Romaji	Hangul-Romaja	Frequency	Simplified	Examples
1	一	1	one	一字旁	yī	nhất	いち / ichi	한일 / hanil	42		王、丁、七、三
2	丨	1	line		gǔn	cổn	ぼう /bō	뚫을곤 / ddulheulgon	21		十、中、串、丰
3	丶	1	dot	丶字旁	zhǔ	chủ	てん / ten	점주 / jeomju	10		丸、凡、丹、户
4	丿 (乀)	1	slash		piě	phiệt	の / no	삐침별 / bbichimbyeol	33		乂、乃、久、八
5	乙 (乚、乛、⺄)	1	second		yǐ	ất	おつ / otsu	새을 / saeeul	42		九、乞、也
6	亅	1	hook		jué	quyết	はねぼう /hanebō	갈고리궐 / galgorigweol	19		了、矛、事
7	二	2	two		èr	nhị	ふた / futa	두이 / dui	29		貳、于、云、些
8	亠	2	lid	六字头	tóu	đầu	なべぶた / nabebuta	돼지해머리 / dwaejihaemeori	38		方、亡、亢、交
9	人 (亻、𠆢)	2	man	单立人 单人旁	rén	nhân (nhân đứng)	ひと / hito (にんべん nin'ben / ひとやね /hitoyane)	사람인 (변) / saramin (byeon)	794		你、什、仁、仇
10	儿	2	son, legs		ér	nhân (nhân đi)	にんにょう / ninnyō, ひとあし / hitoashi	어진사람인발 / eojinsaraminbal	52	(pr. 兒)	兒、兀、允、元
11	入	2	enter	入字旁	rù	nhập	いる / iru	들입 / deurip	28		內、全、兩、汆
12	八 (丷)	2	eight		bā	bát	はちがしら / hachigashira	여덟팔 / yeodeolbpal	44		公、六、兮、穴
13	冂	2	wide	同字匡	jiōng	quynh khuynh	まきがまえ / makigamae	멀경몸 / meolgyeongmom	50		冇、冊、冉、肉
14	冖	2	cloth cover	秃宝盖	mì	mịch	わかんむり / wakammuri	민갓머리 / mingatmeori	30		冗、冠、冥、運
15	冫	2	ice	两点水	bīng	băng	にすい / nisui	이수변 / isubyeon	115		冬、冰、冶、凉
16	几	2	table	几字旁	jī	kỷ	つくえ / tsukue	안석궤 / anseokgwe	38		風、殳、凡、凱
17	凵	2	receptacle	凶字框	kǎn	khảm	うけばこ / ukebako	위튼입구몸 / witeunipgumom	23		凶、凸、凹、齒
18	刀 (刂、⺈)	2	knife	刀字旁 立刀旁	dāo	đao	かたな / katana	(선) 칼도 (방) / (seon) kaldo (bang)	377		刁、解、分、劍
19	力	2	power		lì	lực	ちから / chikara	힘력 / himryeok	163		加、功、劣、男
20	勹	2	wrap	包字头	bāo	bao	つつみがまえ / tsutsumigamae	쌀포몸 / ssalpomom	64		包、勺、勻、勾
21	匕	2	spoon		bǐ	chủy	さじのひ / sajinohi	비수비 / bisubi	19		化、北、匙、比
22	匚	2	box	医字框	fāng	phương	はこがまえ / hakogamae	튼입구몸 / teunipgumom	64		匿、區、巨、匠
23	匸	2	hiding enclosure		xǐ/xì	hệ	かくしがまえ / kakushigamae	감출혜몸 / gamchulhyemom	17		亡、匹、匼、匽
24	十	2	ten		shí	thập	じゅう / jū	열십 / yeolsip	55		千、半、卅、升
25	卜	2	divination		bǔ	bốc	ぼくのと / bokunoto	점복 / jeombok	45		下、上、卡、占
26	卩 (㔾)	2	seal (device)	单耳刀	jié	tiết	ふしづくり / fushizukuri	병부절 / byeongbujeol	40		即、卬、卷、夗
27	厂	2	cliff		hǎn	hán	がんだれ / gandare	민엄호 / mineomho	129	(pr. 廠)	厄、原、厚、厰
28	厶	2	private	私字旁	sī	tư (khư)	む / mu	마늘모 / maneulmo	40		台、公、去、參、
29	又	2	again		yòu	hựu	また / mata	또우 / ddou	91		叉、及、友、取
30	口	3	mouth		kǒu	khẩu	くち / kuchi	입구 / ipgu	1,146		哎、古、只、品
31	囗	3	enclosure	国字框	wéi	vi	くにがまえ / kunigamae	큰입구 (몸) / keunipgu (mom)	118		囚、四、國、圍
32	土	3	earth	提土旁	tǔ	thổ	つち / tsuchi	흙토 / heulkto	580		地、圣、圭、堯
33	士	3	scholar		shì	sĩ	さむらい / samurai	선비사 / seonbisa	24		壬、喜、時、壽
34	夂	3	go		zhǐ	trĩ (truy)	ふゆがしら / fuyugashira	뒤져올치 / dwijyeoolchi	11		各、冬、夆、愛
35	夊	3	go slowly		suī	tuy	すいにょう / suinyō	천천히걸을쇠발 / cheoncheonhigeoreulsoebal	23		夌、复、夏
36	夕	3	evening		xī	tịch	ゆうべ /yūbe	저녁석 / jeonyeokseok	34		外、夗、多、岁
37	大	3	big		dà	đại	だい / dai	큰대 / keundae	132		太、天、夭、夯
38	女	3	woman		nǚ	nữ	おんな / onna	계집녀 / gyejipnyeo	681		妳、婆、奶、如
39	子	3	child	子字旁	zǐ	tử	こ / ko	아들자 / adeulja	83		孩、學、孔、仔
40	宀	3	roof	宝盖头	mián	miên	うかんむり / ukammuri	갓머리 / gatmeori	246		家、安、寧、它
41	寸	3	inch		cùn	thốn	すん / sun	마디촌 / madichon	40		村、寺、封、射
42	小 (⺌、⺍)	3	small	当字头	xiǎo	tiểu	しょう / shō	작을소 / jageulso	41		少、尖、當、栄
43	尢 (尣)	3	lame		wāng	uông	まげあし / mageashi	절름발이왕 / jeolleumbariwang	66		尤、尷、尬、尩
44	尸	3	corpse		shī	thi	しかばね / shikabane	주검시엄 / jugeomsieom	148	(pr. 屍)	屍、尺、尼、尻
45	屮	3	sprout		chè	triệt	てつ / tetsu	왼손좌 / oensonjwa	38		艸、屯、屰、頓
46	山	3	mountain		shān	sơn	やま / yama	뫼산 / moesan	636		嵗、密、峰、幽
47	巛 (川)	3	river		chuān	xuyên	まがりがわ / magarigawa	개미허리 (내천) / gaemiheori (naecheon)	26		川、州、順、災
48	工	3	work		gōng	công	たくみ / takumi	장인공 / jangingong	17		左、巧、功、式
49	己	3	oneself		jǐ	kỷ	おのれ / onore	몸기 / momgi	20		記、改、忌、龍
50	巾	3	turban	巾字儿	jīn	cân	はば / haba	수건건 / sugeongeon	295		市、帥、刷、砸
51	干	3	dry		gān	can	ほす / hosu	방패간 / bangpaegan	9	(pr. 乾、幹)	旱、开、平、年
52	幺 (么)	3	short thread		yāo	yêu	いとがしら / itogashira	작을요 / jageulyo	50		幻、麼、幽、幾
53	广	3	dotted cliff	广字旁	yǎn	nghiễm	まだれ / madare	엄호 / eomho	291	(pr. 廣)	庀、庂、庄
54	廴	3	long stride	建之旁	yǐn	dẫn	えんにょう / ennyō	민책받침 / minchaekbatchim	9		廵、廷、延
55	廾	3	arch	弄字底	gǒng	củng	にじゅうあし / nijūashi	스물입발 / sumeuripbal	50		廿、弁、弄
56	弋	3	shoot		yì	dặc	しきがまえ / shikigamae	주살익 / jusarik	15		弌、弍、弎
57	弓	3	bow	弓字旁	gōng	cung	ゆみ / yumi	활궁 / hwalgung	165		弔、引、弗
58	彐 (彑)	3	snout		jì	ký/kệ	けいがしら / keigashira	튼가로왈 / teungarowal	25		彔、彖、彗
59	彡	3	bristle	三撇儿	shān	sam	さんづくり / sandzukuri	터럭삼 / teoreoksam	62		形、彤、彥
60	彳	3	step	双立人	chì	sách	ぎょうにんべん / gyōnimben	두인변 / duinbyeon	215		㣔、彴、彷
61	心 (忄、⺗)	4	heart	竖心旁	xīn	tâm	しん / こころ / shin / kokoro	마음심 (심방변 / 마음심밑) / maeumsim (simbangbyeon / maeumsimmit)	1,115		必、忉、忌
62	戈	4	halberd		gē	qua	かのほこ / kanohoko	창과 / changgwa	116		戊、戉、戌
63	戶 (户、戸)	4	door		hù	hộ	と / to	지게호 / jigeho	44	户	戹、戼、戽
64	手 (扌、龵)	4	hand	提手旁 看字头	shǒu	thủ	て / te	손수 (재방변) / sonsu (jaebangbyeon)	1,203		才、扎、扐
65	支	4	branch		zhī	chi	しにょう / shinyō	지탱할지 / jitaenghalji	26		攰、攱、攲
66	攴 (攵)	4	rap, tap		pū	phộc	ぼくづくり / bokuzukuri	칠복 (등글월문) / chilbok (deunggeulweolmun)	296		收、攷、攸
67	文	4	script		wén	văn	ぶん / bun	글월문 / geulweolmun	26		斉、斌、斐
68	斗	4	dipper		dǒu	đẩu	とます / tomasu	말두 / maldu	32		料、斚、斛
69	斤	4	axe		jīn	cân	おの / ono	날근 / nalgeun	55		斥、斧、斨
70	方	4	square		fāng	phương	ほう / hō	모방 / mobang	92		㫃、於、㫄
71	无 (旡)	4	not		wú	vô	なし / nashi	이미기방 / imigibang	12		既、旣、旤
72	日	4	sun		rì	nhật	にち / nichi	날일 / naril	453		旦、旨、早
73	曰	4	say		yuē	viết	いわく / iwaku	가로왈 / garowal	37		曲、曳、更
74	月	4	moon		yuè	nguyệt	つき / tsuki	달월 / dalweol	69		有、朋、服
75	木	4	tree	木字旁	mù	mộc	き / ki	나무목 / namumok	1,369		未、末、本
76	欠	4	lack	欠字旁	qiàn	khiếm	あくび / akubi	하품흠 / hapumheum	235		次、欣、欥
77	止	4	stop		zhǐ	chỉ	とめる / tomeru	그칠지 / geuchilji	99		正、此、步
78	歹 (歺)	4	death		dǎi	đãi (ngạt)	がつ / gatsu	죽을사변 / jugeulsabyeon	231		歺、死、歿
79	殳	4	weapon		shū	thù	ほこつくり / hokotsukuri	갖은등글월문 / gajeundeunggeulweolmun	93		段、殷、殺
80	毋 (母)	4	do not		wú	vô	なかれ / nakare	말무 / malmu	16		母、每、毐
81	比	4	compare		bǐ	tỷ/tỵ/tị	くらべる / kuraberu	견줄비 / gyeonjulbi	21		毖、毗、毘
82	毛	4	fur		máo	mao	け / ke	터럭모 / teoreokmo	211		毡、毣、毧
83	氏	4	clan		shì	thị	うじ / uji	각시씨 / gaksissi	10		氐、民、氓
84	气	4	steam		qì	khí	きがまえ / kigamae	기운기엄 / giungieom	17	(pr. 氣)	氕、氘、氚
85	水 (氵、氺)	4	water	三点水	shuǐ	thủy	みず / mizu (さんずい / sanzui, したみず / shitamizu)	(아래) 물수 (삼수변) / (arae) mulsu (samsubyeon)	1,595		永、氷、氾
86	火 (灬)	4	fire	四点底 火字旁	huǒ	hỏa	ひ / hi	불화 (연화발) / bulhwa (yeonhwabal)	639		灰、灯、灶
87	爪 (爫)	4	claw	受字头	zhǎo	trảo	つめ / tsume	손톱조 / sontopjo	36		爬、爭、爰
88	父	4	father		fù	phụ	ちち / chichi	아버지 / abeoji	10		爸、爹、爺
89	爻	4	trigrams		yáo	hào	こう / kō	점괘효 / jeomgwaehyo	16		爼、爽、爾
90	爿 (丬)	4	split wood	将字旁	qiáng	tường	しょうへん / shōhen	장수장변 / jangsujangbyeon	48		牀、牁、牂
91	片	4	slice		piàn	phiến	かた / kata	조각편 / jogakpyeon	77		版、牉、牌
92	牙	4	fang		yá	nha	きば / kiba	어금니아 / eogeumnia	9		㸦、㸧、牚
93	牛 (牜、⺧)	4	cow	牛字旁	niú	ngưu	うし / ushi	소우 / sou	233		牝、牟、牠
94	犬 (犭)	4	dog	反犬旁	quǎn	khuyển	いぬ / inu	개견 (개사슴록변) / gaegyeon (gaesaseumnokbyeon)	444		犮、犯、犰
95	玄	5	profound		xuán	huyền	げん / gen	검을현 / geomeulhyeon	6		玅、率、玈
96	玉 (王、玊)	5	jade		yù	ngọc	たま / tama	구슬옥변 / guseulokbyeon	473		玻、瑪、璧
97	瓜	5	melon		guā	qua	うり /uri	오이과 / oigwa	55		瓝、瓞、瓟
98	瓦	5	tile		wǎ	ngõa	かわら / kawara	기와와 / giwawa	174		㼚、瓮、瓫
99	甘	5	sweet		gān	cam	あまい / amai	달감 / dalgam	22		甚、甜、甛
100	生	5	life		shēng	sinh	うまれる / umareru	날생 / nalsaeng	22		甡、產、甥
101	用	5	use		yòng	dụng	もちいる / mochiiru	쓸용 / sseulyong	10		甩、甫、甬
102	田	5	field		tián	điền	た / ta	밭전 / batjeon	192		由、甲、申
103	疋 (⺪)	5	bolt of cloth	疋字底	pǐ	thất/sơ	ひき / hiki	짝필 / jjakpil	15		疌、疏、疎
104	疒	5	sickness	病字旁	nè	nạch	やまいだれ / yamaidare	병질엄 / byeongjileom	526		疔、疚、疝
105	癶	5	footsteps	登字头	bō	bát	はつがしら / hatsugashira	필발머리 / pilbalmeori	15		癸、癹、発
106	白	5	white		bái	bạch	しろ / shiro	흰백 / heuinbaek	109		百、皀、皁
107	皮	5	skin		pí	bì	けがわ / kegawa	가죽피 / gajukpi	94		皯、皰、皴
108	皿	5	dish		mǐn	mãnh	さら / sara	그릇명 / geureutmyeong	129		盂、盃、盅
109	目 (⺫)	5	eye	目字旁	mù	mục	め / me	눈목 / nunmok	647		盯、盱、盲
110	矛	5	spear		máo	mâu	むのほこ / munohoko	창모 / changmo	65		矜、矞、矟
111	矢	5	arrow		shǐ	thỉ	や / ya	화살시 / hwasalsi	64		矣、知、矧
112	石	5	stone		shí	thạch	いし / ishi	돌석 / dolseok	499		矸、矻、矼
113	示 (礻)	5	spirit	示字旁	shì	thị (kỳ)	しめす / shimesu	보일시 (변) / boilsi (byeon)	213		礼、礽、社
114	禸	5	track		róu	nhựu	ぐうのあし / gūnoashi	짐승발자국유 / jimseungbaljagugyu	12		禹、禺、离
115	禾	5	grain	禾木旁	hé	hòa	のぎ / nogi	벼화 / byeohwa	431		禿、秀、私
116	穴	5	cave		xué	huyệt	あな / ana	구멍혈 / gumeonghyeol	298		究、穸、空
117	立	5	stand		lì	lập	たつ / tatsu	설립 / seollip	101		竑、竒、竘
118	竹 (⺮)	6	bamboo	竹字头	zhú	trúc	たけ / take	대죽 / daejuk	953		竺、竽、竿
119	米	6	rice	米字旁	mǐ	mễ	こめ / kome	쌀미 / ssalmi	318		籸、籹、籽
120	糸 (糹)	6	silk	绞丝旁	mì	mịch	いと / ito	실사 / silsa	823	纟	系、糾、紀
121	缶	6	jar		fǒu	phẫu	ほとぎ / hotogi	장군부 / janggunbu	77		缸、缺、缽
122	网 (⺲、罓、⺳)	6	net		wǎng	võng	あみがしら / amigashira	그물망 / geumulmang	163		罔、罕、罘
123	羊 (⺶、⺷)	6	sheep		yáng	dương	ひつじ /hitsuji	양양 / yangyang	156		羋、羌、美
124	羽	6	feather		yǔ	vũ	はね / hane	깃우 / gisu	220		羿、翀、翁
125	老 (耂)	6	old	老字头	lǎo	lão	おい / oi	늙을로 / neulgeullo	22		考、者、耆
126	而	6	and		ér	nhi	しかして / shikashite	말이을이 / malieuri	22		耍、耎、耏
127	耒	6	plough		lěi	lỗi	らいすき / raisuki	가래뢰 / garaeroe	84		耔、耕、耖
128	耳	6	ear		ěr	nhĩ	みみ / mimi	귀이 / gwii	172		耴、耵、耷
129	聿 (⺺、⺻)	6	brush		yù	duật	ふでづくり / fudezukuri	붓율 / busyul	19		肄、肆、肅
130	肉 (⺼)	6	meat		ròu	nhục	にく / niku	고기육 (육달월) / gogiyuk (yukdalwol)	674	月	肊、肋、然
131	臣	6	minister		chén	thần	しん / shin	신하신 / sinhasin	16		臤、臥、臧
132	自	6	self		zì	tự	みずから / mizukara	스스로자 / seuseuroja	34		臬、臭、臯
133	至	6	arrive		zhì	chí	いたる / itaru	이를지 / ireulji	24		致、臷、臺
134	臼	6	mortar		jiù	cữu	うす / usu	절구구 (변) / jeolgugu (byeon)	71		臾、臿、舁
135	舌	6	tongue		shé	thiệt	した / shita	혀설 / hyeoseol	31		舍、舐、舑
136	舛	6	oppose		chuǎn	suyễn	ます / masu	어그러질천 / eogeureojilcheon	10		舜、舝、舞
137	舟	6	boat		zhōu	chu	ふね / fune	배주 / baeju	197		舠、舡、舢
138	艮	6	stopping		gèn	cấn	こん / kon	괘이름간 / gwaeireumgan	5		良、艱
139	色	6	color		sè	sắc	いろ / iro	빛색 / bitsaek	21		艳、艴、艵
140	艸 (⺿)	6	grass	草字头	cǎo	thảo	くさ / kusa	풀초 (초두머리) / pulcho (chodumeori)	1,902	⺾	艽、艾、芃
141	虍	6	tiger		hū	hổ	とらかんむり / torakammuri	범호엄 / beomhoeom	114		虎、虐、虒
142	虫	6	insect		chóng	trùng	むし / mushi	벌레훼 / beollehwe	1,067	(pr. 蟲)	虬、虯、虱
143	血	6	blood		xuè	huyết	ち / chi	피혈 / pihyeol	60		衁、衂、衃
144	行	6	walk enclosure		xíng	hành/hàng	ぎょう / gyō	다닐행 / danilhaeng	53		衍、衎、衒
145	衣 (⻂)	6	clothes	衣字旁	yī	y	ころも / koromo	옷의 (변) /oseui (byeon)	607		初、表、衫
146	襾 (西、覀)	6	cover		yà	á	あ/ a	덮개 / deopgae	29		西、要、覂
147	見	7	see		jiàn	kiến	みる / miru	볼견 / bolgyeon	161	见	規、覓、視
148	角 (⻇)	7	horn		jiǎo	giác	つの / tsuno	뿔각 / bbulgak	158	⻆	觓、觔、觕
149	言 (訁)	7	speech	言字旁	yán	ngôn	ことば / kotoba	말씀언 / malsseumeon	861	讠	訂、訃、計
150	谷	7	valley		gǔ	cốc	たに / tani	골곡 / golgok	54		谹、谽、谿
151	豆	7	bean		dòu	đậu	まめ / mame	콩두 / kongdu	68		豇、豈、豉
152	豕	7	pig		shǐ	thỉ	いのこ / inoko	돼지시 / dwaejisi	148		豗、豚、豜
153	豸	7	badger		zhì	trãi	むじな / mujina	갖은돼지시변 / gajeundwaejisibyeon	140		豺、豻、豹
154	貝	7	shell		bèi	bối	かい / kai	조개패 / jogaepae	277	贝	貞、負、財
155	赤	7	red		chì	xích	あか / aka	붉을적 / bulgeuljeok	31		赦、赧、赨
156	走	7	run		zǒu	tẩu	はしる / hashiru	달릴주 / dallilju	285		赳、赴、赶
157	足 (⻊)	7	foot	足字旁	zú	túc	あし / ashi	발족 / baljok	580		趴、趵、趷
158	身	7	body		shēn	thân	み / mi	몸신 / momsin	97		躬、躭、躰
159	車	7	cart	车字旁	chē	xa	くるま / kuruma	수레거 / suregeo	361	车	軋、軌、軍
160	辛	7	bitter		xīn	tân	からい / karai	매울신 / maeulsin	36		辜、辝、辟
161	辰	7	morning		chén	thần/thìn	しんのたつ / shinnotatsu	별진 / byeoljin	15		辱、農、辴
162	辵 (⻌、⻍、⻎)	7	walk	走之底	chuò	sước	しんにょう / shinnyō	갖은책받침 (책받침) / gajeunchaekbatchim (chaekbatchim)	381		边、巡、迂
163	邑 (⻏)	7	city	右耳朵	yì	ấp	むら / mura	고을읍 (우부방) / goeureup (ububang)	350		邕、邗、邘
164	酉	7	wine		yǒu	dậu	ひよみのとり / hiyominotori	닭유 / dalgyu	290		酊、酋、酌
165	釆	7	distinguish		biàn	biện	のごめ / nogome	분별할변 / bunbyeolhalbyeon	14		采、釉、釋
166	里	7	village		lǐ	lý	さと / sato	마을리 / maeulli	14		重、野、量
167	金 (釒)	8	gold	金字旁	jīn	kim	かね / kane	쇠금 / soegeum	806	钅	釓、釔、釕
168	長 (镸)	8	long		cháng	trường/trưởng	ながい / nagai	길장 (변) / giljang (byeon)	55	长	镺、镻、镼
169	門	8	gate	门字框	mén	môn	もん / mon	문문 / munmun	246	门	閂、閃、閆
170	阜 (⻖)	8	mound		fù	phụ	おか / oka	언덕부 (좌부변) / eondeokbu (jwabubyeon)	348		阞、阡、阢
171	隶	8	slave		lì	lệ	れいづくり / reizukuri	미칠이 / michiri	12		𨽻、隷、隸
172	隹	8	short-tailed bird		zhuī	chuy	ふるとり / furutori	새추 / saechu	233		隻、隼、隽
173	雨	8	rain		yǔ	vũ	あめ / ame	비우 / biu	298		雩、雪、雯
174	靑 (青)	8	blue		qīng	thanh	あお / ao	푸를청 / pureulcheong	17		靖、静、靚
175	非	8	wrong		fēi	phi	あらず / arazu	아닐비 / anilbi	25		靟、靠、靡
176	面 (靣)	9	face		miàn	diện	めん / men	낯면 / natmyeon	66		靤、靦、靧
177	革	9	leather		gé	cách	かくのかわ / kakunokawa	가죽혁 / gajukhyeok	305		靭、靮、靳
178	韋	9	tanned leather		wéi	vi	なめしがわ / nameshigawa	가죽위 / gajugwi	100	韦	韌、韍、韎
179	韭	9	leek		jiǔ	cửu	にら / nira	부추구 / buchugu	20		韰、韲、䪢
180	音	9	sound		yīn	âm	おと / oto	소리음 / sorieum	43		竟、章、韵
181	頁	9	leaf		yè	hiệt	おおがい / ōgai	머리혈 / meorihyeol	372	页	頂、頃、頄
182	風	9	wind		fēng	phong	かぜ / kaze	바람풍 / barampung	182	风	颩、颭、颮
183	飛	9	fly		fēi	phi	とぶ / tobu	날비 / nalbi	92	飞	䬡、飜、飝
184	食 (飠)	9	eat	食字旁	shí	thực	しょく / shoku	밥식 (변) / bapsik (byeon)	403	饣	飡、飢、飣
185	首	9	head		shǒu	thủ	くび / kubi	머리수 / meorisu	20		馗、䭫、馘
186	香	9	fragrant		xiāng	hương	においこう / nioikō	향기향 / hyanggihyang	37		馝、馞、馡
187	馬	10	horse		mǎ	mã	うま / uma	말마 / malma	472	马	馭、馮、馯
188	骨	10	bone		gǔ	cốt	ほね / hone	뼈골 / ppyeogol	185	⻣	骫、骭、骯
189	高 (髙)	10	tall		gāo	cao	たかい / takai	높을고 / nopeulgo	34		髚、髛、𩫛
190	髟	10	hair		biāo	bưu/tiêu	かみがしら / kamigashira	터럭발 / teoreokbal	243		髠、髡、髢
191	鬥	10	fight		dòu	đấu	とうがまえ / tōgamae	싸울투 / ssaultu	23		鬦、鬧、鬨
192	鬯	10	sacrificial wine		chàng	sưởng	ちょう / chō	울창주창 / ulchangjuchang	8		鬰、鬱
193	鬲	10	cauldron		lì	cách	かなえ / kanae	다리굽은솥력 / darigubeunsotryeok	73		鬳、鬴、鬵
194	鬼	10	ghost		guǐ	quỷ	おに / oni	귀신귀 / gwisingwi	141		鬾、魁、魂
195	魚	11	fish		yú	ngư	うお / uo	물고기어 / mulgogieo	571	鱼	魟、魠、魦
196	鳥	11	bird		niǎo	điểu	とり / tori	새조 / saejo	750	鸟	鳦、鳧、鳩
197	鹵	11	salt		lǔ	lỗ	ろ / ro	짠땅로 / jjanddangro	44	卤	鹹、鹺、鹼
198	鹿	11	deer		lù	lộc	しか / shika	사슴록 / saseumrok	104		麀、麁、麂
199	麥	11	wheat		mài	mạch	むぎ / mugi	보리맥 / borimaek	131	麦	麨、麩、麪
200	麻	11	hemp		má	ma	あさ / asa	삼마 / samma	34		麼、麾、黁
201	黃	12	yellow		huáng	hoàng	きいろ / kiiro	누를황 / nureulhwang	42	黄	黈、䵍、黌
202	黍	12	millet		shǔ	thử	きび / kibi	기장서 / gijangseo	46		黎、黏、黐
203	黑	12	black		hēi	hắc	くろ / kuro	검을흑 / geomeulheuk	172		墨、黓、黔
204	黹	12	embroidery		zhǐ	chỉ	ふつ / futsu	바느질할치 / baneujilhalchi	8		黺、黻、黼
205	黽	13	frog		mǐn	mãnh	べん / ben	맹꽁이 / maengkkongi	40	黾	黿、鼀、鼁
206	鼎	13	tripod		dǐng	đỉnh	かなえ / kanae	솥정 / sotjeong	14		鼏、鼐、鼒
207	鼓	13	drum		gǔ	cổ	つづみ / tsudzumi	북고 / bukgo	46		鼕、鼖、鼗
208	鼠	13	rat		shǔ	thử	ねずみ / nezumi	쥐서 / jwiseo	92		鼢、鼥、鼩
209	鼻	14	nose		bí	tị	はな / hana	코비 / kobi	49		鼽、鼾、齁
210	齊 (斉)	14	even		qí	tề	せい / sei	가지런할제 / gajireonhalje	18	齐	齋、齌、齍
211	齒	15	tooth		chǐ	xỉ	は / ha	이치 / ichi	162	齿	齔、齕、齖
212	龍	16	dragon		lóng	long	りゅう / ryū	용룡 / yongryong	14	龙	龏、龑、龔
213	龜	16	turtle		guī	quy	かめ / kame	거북귀 / geobukgwi	24	龟	䶰、龝、龞
214	龠	17	flute		yuè	dược	やく / yaku	피리약 / piriyak	19		龡、龢、龤

== In Unicode ==
In Unicode version 3.0 (1999), a separate Kangxi Radicals block was introduced, which encodes the 214 radicals in sequence, at U+2F00–2FD5. These are specific code points intended to represent the radical qua radical, as opposed to the character consisting of the unaugmented radical; thus, U+2F00 represents radical 1 while U+4E00 represents the character yī meaning "one". In addition, the CJK Radicals Supplement block (2E80–2EFF) was introduced, encoding alternative (often positional) forms taken by Kangxi radicals as they appear within specific characters. For example, ⺁ "CJK RADICAL CLIFF" (U+2E81) is a variant of ⼚ radical 27 (U+2F1A), itself identical in shape to the character consisting of unaugmented radical 27, 厂 "cliff" (U+5382).

Kangxi Radicals^{[1]}^{[2]} Official Unicode Consortium code chart (PDF)
	0	1	2	3	4	5	6	7	8	9	A	B	C	D	E	F
U+2F0x	⼀	⼁	⼂	⼃	⼄	⼅	⼆	⼇	⼈	⼉	⼊	⼋	⼌	⼍	⼎	⼏
U+2F1x	⼐	⼑	⼒	⼓	⼔	⼕	⼖	⼗	⼘	⼙	⼚	⼛	⼜	⼝	⼞	⼟
U+2F2x	⼠	⼡	⼢	⼣	⼤	⼥	⼦	⼧	⼨	⼩	⼪	⼫	⼬	⼭	⼮	⼯
U+2F3x	⼰	⼱	⼲	⼳	⼴	⼵	⼶	⼷	⼸	⼹	⼺	⼻	⼼	⼽	⼾	⼿
U+2F4x	⽀	⽁	⽂	⽃	⽄	⽅	⽆	⽇	⽈	⽉	⽊	⽋	⽌	⽍	⽎	⽏
U+2F5x	⽐	⽑	⽒	⽓	⽔	⽕	⽖	⽗	⽘	⽙	⽚	⽛	⽜	⽝	⽞	⽟
U+2F6x	⽠	⽡	⽢	⽣	⽤	⽥	⽦	⽧	⽨	⽩	⽪	⽫	⽬	⽭	⽮	⽯
U+2F7x	⽰	⽱	⽲	⽳	⽴	⽵	⽶	⽷	⽸	⽹	⽺	⽻	⽼	⽽	⽾	⽿
U+2F8x	⾀	⾁	⾂	⾃	⾄	⾅	⾆	⾇	⾈	⾉	⾊	⾋	⾌	⾍	⾎	⾏
U+2F9x	⾐	⾑	⾒	⾓	⾔	⾕	⾖	⾗	⾘	⾙	⾚	⾛	⾜	⾝	⾞	⾟
U+2FAx	⾠	⾡	⾢	⾣	⾤	⾥	⾦	⾧	⾨	⾩	⾪	⾫	⾬	⾭	⾮	⾯
U+2FBx	⾰	⾱	⾲	⾳	⾴	⾵	⾶	⾷	⾸	⾹	⾺	⾻	⾼	⾽	⾾	⾿
U+2FCx	⿀	⿁	⿂	⿃	⿄	⿅	⿆	⿇	⿈	⿉	⿊	⿋	⿌	⿍	⿎	⿏
U+2FDx	⿐	⿑	⿒	⿓	⿔	⿕										
Notes 1.As of Unicode version 18.0 2.Grey areas indicate non-assigned code points

== See also ==
- List of Shuowen Jiezi radicals
- List of radicals in Unicode
  - Unicode chart – Kangxi Radicals (above)
  - Unicode chart – CJK Radicals Supplement
- Table of Indexing Chinese Character Components (aka List of Xinhua Zidian radicals) – 189 radicals
- List of Japanese radicals
- Section headers of a Chinese dictionary
- CJK Unified Ideographs
- Ideographic Description Sequences
