= Radical 22 =

Chinese character radical

匚
- Radical 22 (U+2F15)
- 匚 (U+531A) "box"

Pronunciations
- Pinyin: fāng
- Bopomofo: ㄈㄤ
- Wade–Giles: fang1
- Cantonese Yale: fong1
- Jyutping: fong1
- Pe̍h-ōe-jī: hong
- Japanese Kana: ホウ hō (on'yomi) はこ hako (kun'yomi)
- Sino-Korean: 방 bang
- Hán-Việt: phương

Names
- Chinese name(s): 左方框 zuǒfāngkuàng
- Japanese name(s): 匚構/はこがまえ hakogamae
- Hangul: 상자 sanja

Stroke order animation

Radical 22 or radical right open box (匚部) meaning "box" is one of the 23 Kangxi radicals (214 radicals total) composed of two strokes.

In the Kangxi Dictionary, there are 64 characters (out of 49,030) to be found under this radical.

In Traditional Chinese used in Taiwan, Hong Kong and Macau, radical 22 (right open box, 匚), whose two strokes share the same starting point, is slightly different from radical 23 (hiding enclosure, 匸), whose second stroke starts is a bit right to the starting point of the first stroke.

In mainland China, the two radicals were unified as right open box 匚, which then became the 8th indexing component in Table of Indexing Chinese Character Components predominantly adopted by Simplified Chinese dictionaries, and the nuance between the two radicals no longer exists; No associated indexing component is left after the merger. This merger also applies to Traditional Chinese characters in China's GB character set.

Radical 22 and radical 23 were also unified in Japanese kanji. JIS character set (including kyūjitai). Mainstream Japanese fonts and dictionaries do not distinguish between the two radicals.

== Evolution ==
Oracle bone script character

Bronze script character

Large seal script character

Small seal script character

An archaic version of this radical, directly regularised from the bronzeware and seal script forms, occasionally appears in regular script (kai shu) or printed text as 𠥓 (12 strokes, 匚 + 10 strokes, e.g., 𠥧, an archaic version of 杯) and is used for the transcription of ancient inscriptions.

== Derived characters ==
Strokes	Characters
+0	匚
+3	匛 匜 匝 匞
+4	匟 匠 匡 匢
+5	匣 匤 匥 医^{SC/JP} (=醫 -> 酉)
+7	匦^{SC} (=匭) 匧
+8	匨 匩 匪 匫
+9	匬 匭 匮^{SC} (=匱)
+10	𠥓
+11	匯 匰
+12	匱 匲
+13	匳
+14	匴
+15	匵
+17	匶
+18	匷

== Literature ==
- Fazzioli, Edoardo (1987). Chinese calligraphy : from pictograph to ideogram : the history of 214 essential Chinese/Japanese characters. calligraphy by Rebecca Hon Ko. New York: Abbeville Press. ISBN 0-89659-774-1.
- Lunde, Ken (Jan 5, 2009). "Appendix J: Japanese Character Sets" (PDF). CJKV Information Processing: Chinese, Japanese, Korean & Vietnamese Computing (Second ed.). Sebastopol, Calif.: O'Reilly Media. ISBN 978-0-596-51447-1.
