= Radical 124 =

Chinese character radical

羽
- Radical 124 (U+2F7B)
- 羽 (U+7FBD) "feather"

Pronunciations
- Pinyin: yǔ
- Bopomofo: ㄩˇ
- Wade–Giles: yu3
- Cantonese Yale: yu5
- Jyutping: jyu5
- Japanese Kana: ウ u (on'yomi) はね hane (kun'yomi)
- Sino-Korean: 우 u

Names
- Chinese name(s): (Left) 羽字旁 yǔzìpáng (Top) 羽字頭/羽字头 yǔzìtóu (Bottom) 羽字底 yǔzìdǐ
- Japanese name(s): 羽/はね hane
- Hangul: 깃 git

Stroke order animation

Radical 124 or radical feather (羽部) meaning "feather" is one of the 29 Kangxi radicals (214 radicals in total) composed of 6 strokes.

In the Kangxi Dictionary, there are 220 characters (out of 49,030) to be found under this radical.

羽 is also the 147th indexing component in the Table of Indexing Chinese Character Components predominantly adopted by Simplified Chinese dictionaries published in mainland China.

== Evolution ==
Oracle bone script character

Bronze script character

Large seal script character

Small seal script character

== Derived characters ==
Strokes	Characters
+0	羽
+3	羾 羿
+4	翀 翁 翂 翃 翄 (=翅) 翅 翆 (=翠)
+5	翇 翈 翉 翊 翋 翌 翍 翎 翏 翐 翑 習
+6	翓 翔 翕 翖 翗 翘^{SC} (=翹) 翙^{SC} (=翽) 翚^{SC} (=翬)
+7	翛 翜 翝
+8	翞 翟 翠 翡 翢 翣 翤
+9	翥 翦 翧 翨 翩 翪 翫 翬 翭
+10	翮 翯 翰 翱
+11	翲 翳 翴 翵 翶 (=翱) 翼
+12	翷 翸 翹 翺 (=翱) 翻
+13	翽 翾
+14	翿 耀

== Variant forms ==
Traditional printing form of 羽 in the Kangxi Dictionary

The most common written form of 羽 in regular script

Regular script imitating the printing form

Traditionally, this radical character is printed as 羽 and written as 羽.

In modern Chinese, both the standard printing form and writing form of this character have been altered to 羽, though the more traditional printing form 羽 is still seen in some Traditional Chinese publication.

In modern Japanese, the Kangxi form (old form) and the written form (new form) are encoded separately in JIS and Unihan (New 羽: U+7FBD; Old 羽: U+FA1E). The new form is used in jōyō kanji while the old form is used in hyōgai kanji, with the exception that in 曜, 耀 and 燿, the component 羽 is replaced by ヨヨ.

Kangxi Dict. Korean	Japanese	Simp. Chinese	Trad. Chinese
翔	翔	翔	翔
翊	翊	翊	翊
翌	翌	翌	翌
曜	曜	曜	曜

== Sinogram ==
The radical is also used as an independent Chinese character. It is one of the Kyōiku kanji or Kanji taught in elementary school in Japan. It is a second grade kanji.

== Literature ==
- Fazzioli, Edoardo (1987). Chinese calligraphy : from pictograph to ideogram : the history of 214 essential Chinese/Japanese characters. calligraphy by Rebecca Hon Ko. New York: Abbeville Press. ISBN 0-89659-774-1.
- Lunde, Ken (Jan 5, 2009). "Appendix J: Japanese Character Sets" (PDF). CJKV Information Processing: Chinese, Japanese, Korean & Vietnamese Computing (Second ed.). Sebastopol, Calif.: O'Reilly Media. ISBN 978-0-596-51447-1.
