= Radical 208 =

Chinese character radical

鼠
- Radical 208 (U+2FCF)
- 鼠 (U+9F20) "rat, mouse"

Pronunciations
- Pinyin: shǔ
- Bopomofo: ㄕㄨˇ
- Wade–Giles: shu3
- Cantonese Yale: syu2
- Jyutping: syu2
- Japanese Kana: ショ, ソ sho, so ねずみ nezumi
- Sino-Korean: 서 seo
- Hán-Việt: thử

Names
- Japanese name(s): 鼠 nezumi
- Hangul: 쥐 jwi

Stroke order animation

Radical 208 meaning "rat" or "mouse" (鼠部) is 1 of 4 Kangxi radicals (214 radicals total) composed of 13 strokes.

In the Kangxi Dictionary there are 92 characters (out of 49,030) to be found under this radical.

== Evolution ==
Shang dynasty Oracle bone script

Large seal script character

Small seal script character

== Characters with Radical 208 ==
strokes	character
+0	鼠 鼡
+4	鼢 鼣 鼤
+5	鼥 鼦 鼧 鼨 鼩 鼪 鼫 鼬
+6	鼭
+7	鼮 鼯 鼰
+8	鼱
+9	鼲 鼳 鼴 鼵
+10	鼶 鼷 鼸 鼹
+15	鼺

== Literature ==
- Fazzioli, Edoardo (1987). Chinese calligraphy : from pictograph to ideogram : the history of 214 essential Chinese/Japanese characters. calligraphy by Rebecca Hon Ko. New York: Abbeville Press. ISBN 0-89659-774-1.
- Lunde, Ken (Jan 5, 2009). "Appendix J: Japanese Character Sets" (PDF). CJKV Information Processing: Chinese, Japanese, Korean & Vietnamese Computing (Second ed.). Sebastopol, Calif.: O'Reilly Media. ISBN 978-0-596-51447-1.
