= Radical 111 =

Chinese character radical

矢
- Radical 111 (U+2F6E)
- 矢 (U+77E2) "arrow"

Pronunciations
- Pinyin: shǐ
- Bopomofo: ㄕˇ
- Wade–Giles: shih3
- Cantonese Yale: chi2
- Jyutping: ci2
- Japanese Kana: シ shi (on'yomi) や ya (kun'yomi)
- Sino-Korean: 시 si

Names
- Chinese name(s): 矢字旁 shǐzìpáng
- Japanese name(s): 矢/や ya 矢偏/やへん yahen
- Hangul: 화살 hwasal

Stroke order animation

Radical 111 or radical arrow (矢部) meaning "arrow" is one of the 23 Kangxi radicals (214 radicals in total) composed of 5 strokes.

In the Kangxi Dictionary, there are 64 characters (out of 49,030) to be found under this radical.

矢 is also the 110th indexing component in the Table of Indexing Chinese Character Components predominantly adopted by Simplified Chinese dictionaries published in mainland China.

== Evolution ==
Compare 畀 and 至.

Oracle bone script character

Bronze script character

Large seal script character

Small seal script character

== Derived characters ==
Strokes	Characters
+0	矢
+2	矣
+3	矤 知
+4	矦 矧 矨
+5	矩
+6	矪 矫
+7	矬 短
+8	矮
+12	矯 矰
+14	矱
+15	矲

== Sinogram ==
As an independent sinogram 矢 is a Chinese character. It is one of the kyōiku kanji or kanji taught in elementary school in Japan. It is taught in second grade.
