= Radical 190 =

Chinese character radical

髟
- Radical 190 (U+2FBD)
- 髟 (U+9ADF) "hair"

Pronunciations
- Pinyin: biāo
- Bopomofo: ㄅㄧㄠ
- Wade–Giles: piao1
- Cantonese Yale: biu1
- Jyutping: biu1
- Japanese Kana: ヒョウ hyō (on'yomi)
- Sino-Korean: 표 pyo
- Hán-Việt: tiêu

Names
- Japanese name(s): 髪頭/かみがしら kamigashira 髪冠/かみかんむり kamikanmuri
- Hangul: 머리 늘어질 meori neureojil

Stroke order animation

Radical 190 or radical hair (髟部) meaning "hair" is one of the 8 Kangxi radicals (214 radicals in total) composed of 10 strokes.

In the Kangxi Dictionary, there are 243 characters (out of 49,030) to be found under this radical.

髟 is also the 188th indexing component in the Table of Indexing Chinese Character Components predominantly adopted by Simplified Chinese dictionaries published in mainland China.

== Evolution ==
Shang dynasty Bronze script

Chu slip and silk script

Small seal script character

== Derived characters ==
Strokes	Characters
+0	髟
+2	髠 (=髡)
+3	髡 髢
+4	髣 (=仿 -> 人) 髤 髥 (=髯) 髦 髧 髨 髩 髪^{JP} (=髮)
+5	髫 髬 髭 髮 髯 髰 髱 髲 髳 髴 (=彿 -> 彳)
+6	髵 髶 髷 髸 髹 髺 髻 鬇
+7	髼 髽 髾 髿 鬀 鬁 鬂
+8	鬃 鬄 鬅 鬆 鬈
+9	鬉 鬊 鬋 鬌 鬍 鬎 鬏
+10	鬐 鬑 鬒 鬓^{SC} (=鬢)
+11	鬔 鬕 鬖 鬗 鬘 鬝
+12	鬙 鬚 鬛 鬜
+13	鬞 鬟 鬠
+14	鬡 鬢
+15	鬣
+17	鬤

== Literature ==
- Fazzioli, Edoardo (1987). Chinese calligraphy : from pictograph to ideogram : the history of 214 essential Chinese/Japanese characters. calligraphy by Rebecca Hon Ko. New York: Abbeville Press. ISBN 0-89659-774-1.
- Lunde, Ken (Jan 5, 2009). "Appendix J: Japanese Character Sets" (PDF). CJKV Information Processing: Chinese, Japanese, Korean & Vietnamese Computing (Second ed.). Sebastopol, Calif.: O'Reilly Media. ISBN 978-0-596-51447-1.
