= Radical 57 =

Chinese character radical

弓
- Radical 57 (U+2F38)
- 弓 (U+5F13) "bow"

Pronunciations
- Pinyin: gōng
- Bopomofo: ㄍㄨㄥ
- Gwoyeu Romatzyh: gong
- Wade–Giles: kung^{1}
- Cantonese Yale: gūng
- Jyutping: gung1
- Pe̍h-ōe-jī: kiong
- Japanese Kana: キュウ kyū (on'yomi) ゆみ yumi (kun'yomi)
- Sino-Korean: 궁 gung

Names
- Chinese name(s): 弓字旁 gōngzìpáng
- Japanese name(s): 弓/ゆみ yumi 弓偏/ゆみへん yumihen
- Hangul: 활 hwal

Stroke order animation

Radical 57 or radical bow (弓部) meaning "bow" is one of the 31 Kangxi radicals (214 radicals in total) composed of three strokes.

In the Kangxi Dictionary, 165 characters (out of 49,030) can be found under this radical.

弓 is also the 53rd indexing component in the Table of Indexing Chinese Character Components predominantly adopted by Simplified Chinese dictionaries published in mainland China.

== Evolution ==
=== 弓 ===
Oracle bone script

Bronze script

Chu slip and silk script

Qin slip script

Large seal script

Small seal script

=== 弔 ===
A man (人) with an arrowhead thread.

Bronze script

Large seal script

Small seal script

=== 弟 ===
A spear handle wrapped in a leather strap.

Bronze script

Large seal script

Small seal script

=== 弗 ===
Rope wrapped around two sticks.

Oracle bone script

Bronze script

== Derived characters ==
Strokes	Characters
+0	弓
+1	弔 引 弖
+2	弗 弘
+3	弙 弚 弛 弜
+4	弝 弞 弟 张^{SC} (張)
+5	弡 弢 弣 弤 弥 弦 弨 弩 弪^{SC} (=弳)
+6	弧 弫 弬 弭 弮 弯^{SC}/弯^{JP} (=彎)
+7	弰 弱 弲
+8	弴 張 弶 強 弸 弹^{SC} (=彈)
+9	强 弻 弼 弽 弾
+10	弿 彀 彁^{"ghost character"} 彂 (=發 -> 癶)
+11	彃 彄 彅^{JP}
+12	彆 彇 彈 彉
+13	彊 (=強) 彋
+14	彌
+15	彍
+19	彎
+20	彏

== Sinogram ==
As an independent Chinese character, it is one of the kyōiku kanji or kanji taught in elementary school in Japan. It is a second grade kanji.
