= CJK Radicals Supplement =

- Range: U+2E80..U+2EFF (128 code points)
- Plane: BMP
- Scripts: Han
- Assigned: 115 code points
- Unused: 13 reserved code points

Unicode version history
- 3.0 (1999): 115 (+115)

Unicode documentation
- Code chart ∣ Web page

CJK Radicals Supplement is a Unicode block containing alternative, often positional, forms of the Kangxi radicals. They are used as headers in dictionary indices and other CJK ideograph collections organized by radical-stroke.

== Block ==
CJK Radicals Supplement^{[1]}^{[2]} Official Unicode Consortium code chart (PDF)
	0	1	2	3	4	5	6	7	8	9	A	B	C	D	E	F
U+2E8x	⺀	⺁	⺂	⺃	⺄	⺅	⺆	⺇	⺈	⺉	⺊	⺋	⺌	⺍	⺎	⺏
U+2E9x	⺐	⺑	⺒	⺓	⺔	⺕	⺖	⺗	⺘	⺙		⺛	⺜	⺝	⺞	⺟
U+2EAx	⺠	⺡	⺢	⺣	⺤	⺥	⺦	⺧	⺨	⺩	⺪	⺫	⺬	⺭	⺮	⺯
U+2EBx	⺰	⺱	⺲	⺳	⺴	⺵	⺶	⺷	⺸	⺹	⺺	⺻	⺼	⺽	⺾	⺿
U+2ECx	⻀	⻁	⻂	⻃	⻄	⻅	⻆	⻇	⻈	⻉	⻊	⻋	⻌	⻍	⻎	⻏
U+2EDx	⻐	⻑	⻒	⻓	⻔	⻕	⻖	⻗	⻘	⻙	⻚	⻛	⻜	⻝	⻞	⻟
U+2EEx	⻠	⻡	⻢	⻣	⻤	⻥	⻦	⻧	⻨	⻩	⻪	⻫	⻬	⻭	⻮	⻯
U+2EFx	⻰	⻱	⻲	⻳												
Notes: 1. As of Unicode version 16.0; 2. Grey areas indicate non-assigned code points

== History ==
The following Unicode-related documents record the purpose and process of defining specific characters in the CJK Radicals Supplement block:

Version	Final code points (Note: Proposed code points and characters names may differ from final code points and names)	Count	L2 ID	WG2 ID	IRG ID	Document
3.0	U+2E80..2E99, 2E9B..2EF3	115	L2/97-025	N1492	N407	Proposal Summary Form for Ideographic Radical Supplement, 1996-06-27
3.0	U+2E80..2E99, 2E9B..2EF3	115		N1432	N367	Proposal Summary Form: Ideographic Radical Supplement, 1996-08-01
3.0	U+2E80..2E99, 2E9B..2EF3	115		N1453		Ksar, Mike; Umamaheswaran, V. S. (1996-12-06), "9.8 Ideographic Radical Supplement", WG 2 Minutes - Quebec Meeting 31
3.0	U+2E80..2E99, 2E9B..2EF3	115			N429	TCA's Position Concerning on the WG2's Comments of Ideographic Radical Supplement, 1997-01-15
3.0	U+2E80..2E99, 2E9B..2EF3	115	L2/97-023	N1486	N437	Resolutions of IRG Meeting #8, 1997-01-16
3.0	U+2E80..2E99, 2E9B..2EF3	115		N1489		Supplement to Ideographic Components and Composition Schemes, 1997-01-16
3.0	U+2E80..2E99, 2E9B..2EF3	115		N1490	N436	Response to WG2 question on Ideographic Structure Characters, 1997-01-16
3.0	U+2E80..2E99, 2E9B..2EF3	115	L2/97-030	N1503 (pdf, doc)		Umamaheswaran, V. S.; Ksar, Mike (1997-04-01), "9.4", Unconfirmed Minutes of WG 2 Meeting #32, Singapore; 1997-01-20--24
3.0	U+2E80..2E99, 2E9B..2EF3	115	L2/97-114	N1544 (html, doc)	N453	Sato, T. K. (1997-04-08), Questions on the "Han structure method" described in WG2 N1490 (IRG N436)
3.0	U+2E80..2E99, 2E9B..2EF3	115			N454	Addition of new radicals, 1997-04-08
3.0	U+2E80..2E99, 2E9B..2EF3	115			N455	Japanese Proposal to the Radical Supplement, 1997-04-14
3.0	U+2E80..2E99, 2E9B..2EF3	115	L2/97-162	N1617	N480	Zhang, Zhoucai (1997-06-27), Ideographic Radical Supplement
3.0	U+2E80..2E99, 2E9B..2EF3	115	L2/97-288	N1603		Umamaheswaran, V. S. (1997-10-24), "9.3", Unconfirmed Meeting Minutes, WG 2 Meeting # 33, Heraklion, Crete, Greece, 20 June – 4 July 1997
3.0	U+2E80..2E99, 2E9B..2EF3	115	L2/98-106	N1732		Zhang, Zhoucai (1998-03-19), CJK Radical Suppliment [sic]
3.0	U+2E80..2E99, 2E9B..2EF3	115	L2/98-332	N1923		Combined PDAM registration and consideration ballot on WD for ISO/IEC 10646-1/Amd. 15, AMENDMENT 15: Kang Xi radicals and CJK radicals supplement, 1998-10-28
3.0	U+2E80..2E99, 2E9B..2EF3	115	L2/98-415			Jenkins, John (1998-12-01), Comments on the CJK Radicals Supplement
3.0	U+2E80..2E99, 2E9B..2EF3	115	L2/99-010	N1903 (pdf, html, doc)		Umamaheswaran, V. S. (1998-12-30), "10.4", Minutes of WG 2 meeting 35, London, U.K.; 1998-09-21--25
3.0	U+2E80..2E99, 2E9B..2EF3	115	L2/98-419 (pdf, doc)			Aliprand, Joan (1999-02-05), "CJK Radicals Supplement", Approved Minutes -- UTC #78 & NCITS Subgroup L2 # 175 Joint Meeting, San Jose, CA -- December 1-4, 1998
3.0	U+2E80..2E99, 2E9B..2EF3	115	L2/99-073	N1968 (html, doc)		Summary of Voting on SC 2 N 3213, PDAM ballot on WD for 10646-1/Amd. 15: Kang Xi radicals and CJK radicals supplement, 1999-02-08
3.0	U+2E80..2E99, 2E9B..2EF3	115	L2/99-119			Text for FPDAM ballot of ISO/IEC 10646, Amd. 15 - Kang Xi radicals and CJK radicals supplement, 1999-04-07
3.0	U+2E80..2E99, 2E9B..2EF3	115	L2/99-232	N2003		Umamaheswaran, V. S. (1999-08-03), Minutes of WG 2 meeting 36, Fukuoka, Japan, 1999-03-09--15
3.0	U+2E80..2E99, 2E9B..2EF3	115	L2/99-252	N2065		Summary of Voting on SC 2 N 3311, ISO 10646-1/FPDAM 15 - Kang Xi radicals and CJK radicals supplement, 1999-08-19
3.0	U+2E80..2E99, 2E9B..2EF3	115	L2/99-299	N2121		Disposition of Comments Report on SC 2 N 3311, ISO/IEC 10646-1/FPDAM 15 AMENDMENT 15: Kang Xi radicals and CJK radicals supplement, 1999-09-20
3.0	U+2E80..2E99, 2E9B..2EF3	115	L2/99-300	N2122		Paterson, Bruce (1999-09-21), Revised Text for FDAM ballot of ISO/IEC 10646-1/FDAM 15, AMENDMENT 15: Kang Xi radicals and CJK radicals supplement
3.0	U+2E80..2E99, 2E9B..2EF3	115	L2/00-010	N2103		Umamaheswaran, V. S. (2000-01-05), Minutes of WG 2 meeting 37, Copenhagen, Denmark: 1999-09-13—16
3.0	U+2E80..2E99, 2E9B..2EF3	115	L2/00-044			Summary of FDAM voting: ISO 10646 Amendment 15: Kang Xi radicals and CJK radicals supplement, 2000-01-31
3.0	U+2E80..2E99, 2E9B..2EF3	115		N5122		"M68.12", Unconfirmed minutes of WG 2 meeting 68, 2019-12-31
3.0	U+2E80..2E99, 2E9B..2EF3	115	L2/19-212R	N5069R		Lunde, Ken (2019-06-20), Proposal to change the font for the CJK Radicals Supplement & Kangxi Radicals blocks
3.0	U+2E80..2E99, 2E9B..2EF3	115	L2/19-270			Moore, Lisa (2019-10-07), "B.4.4 Proposal to change the font for the CJK Radicals Supplement and Kangxi Radicals blocks", UTC #160 Minutes
