= Radical 126 =

Chinese character radical

而
- Radical 126 (U+2F7D)
- 而 (U+800C) "and, but"

Pronunciations
- Pinyin: ér
- Bopomofo: ㄦˊ
- Wade–Giles: erh2
- Cantonese Yale: yi4
- Jyutping: ji4
- Japanese Kana: ジ ji /ni ニ (on'yomi) しこう-して shikō-shite / しか-して shika-shite / なんじ nanji (kun'yomi)
- Sino-Korean: 이 i

Names
- Japanese name(s): しこうして shikōshite しかして shikashite
- Hangul: 말 이을 mal ieul

Stroke order animation

Radical 126 or radical and (而部) meaning "and" or "but" is one of the 29 Kangxi radicals (214 radicals in total) composed of 6 strokes.

In the Kangxi Dictionary, there are 22 characters (out of 49,030) to be found under this radical.

而 is also the 127 indexing component in the Table of Indexing Chinese Character Components predominantly adopted by Simplified Chinese dictionaries published in mainland China.

== Evolution ==
Originally meant beard.

Oracle bone script character

Bronze script character

Large seal script character

Small seal script character

== Derived characters ==
Strokes	Characters
+0	而
+3	耍 耎 耏 耐 耑
