= Radical 172 =

Chinese character radical

隹
- Radical 172 (U+2FAB)
- 隹 (U+96B9) "small bird"

Pronunciations
- Pinyin: zhuī
- Bopomofo: ㄓㄨㄟ
- Wade–Giles: chui1
- Cantonese Yale: jeui1
- Jyutping: zeoi1
- Japanese Kana: スイ, とり sui, tori (on'yomi)
- Sino-Korean: 추 chu
- Hán-Việt: chuy

Names
- Japanese name(s): 舊隹/ふるとり furutori
- Hangul: 새 sae

Stroke order animation

Radical 172 or radical short tailed bird (隹部) meaning or "short-tailed bird" is one of the 9 Kangxi radicals (214 radicals in total) composed of 8 strokes.

In the Kangxi Dictionary, there are 233 characters (out of 49,030) to be found under this radical.

隹 is also the 174th indexing component in the Table of Indexing Chinese Character Components predominantly adopted by Simplified Chinese dictionaries published in mainland China.

== Evolution ==
Oracle bone script character

Bronze script character

Large seal script character

Small seal script character

== Derived characters ==
Strokes	Characters
+0	隹
+2	隺 隻 隼 隽^{SC} (=雋) 难^{SC} (=難)
+3	隿 雀
+4	雁 雂 雃 雄 雅 集 雇 (also SC/JP form of 僱 -> 人) 雈
+5	雉 雊 雋 雌 雍 雎 雏^{SC} (=雛)
+6	雐 雑^{JP} (=雜) 雒
+7	雓
+8	雔 雕
+9	雖
+10	雗 雘 雙 雚 雛 雜 雝 雞 雟 雠^{SC} (=讎 -> 言)
+11	雡 離 難
+13	雤
+16	雥 (=雜) 雦 (=集)
+20	雧 (=集)

== Variant Forms ==
There is a difference in Japanese and Chinese in printing typefaces for the third stroke of this radical. In the Kangxi Dictionary and in Japanese, the form with a short line slanting downward to the left on top of the first horizontal line is used. In both Simplified Chinese (mainland China, Singapore) and standard Traditional Chinese (Taiwan, Hong Kong, and Macau), the form with a dot slanting downwards to the right on top of the horizontal line is used, while the Kangxi Dictionary form is still widely used in Traditional Chinese publications.

This difference may also apply to handwritten forms, albeit not always strictly followed.

Kangxi Dict. Japanese Korean T. Chinese nonstandard	Trad. Chinese Simp. Chinese
隹	隹

== Literature ==
- Fazzioli, Edoardo (1987). Chinese calligraphy : from pictograph to ideogram : the history of 214 essential Chinese/Japanese characters. calligraphy by Rebecca Hon Ko. New York: Abbeville Press. ISBN 0-89659-774-1.
