= Radical 211 =

Chinese character radical

齒
- Radical 211 (U+2FD2)
- 齒 (U+9F52) "teeth"

Pronunciations
- Pinyin: chǐ
- Bopomofo: ㄔˇ
- Gwoyeu Romatzyh: chyy
- Wade–Giles: chʻih^{3}
- Cantonese Yale: chí
- Jyutping: ci2
- Japanese Kana: シ shi は ha
- Sino-Korean: 치 chi
- Hán-Việt: xỉ

Names
- Japanese name(s): 歯偏 hahen
- Hangul: 이 i

Stroke order animation

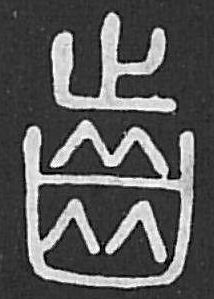
radical 211 in the Shuowen Dictionary

Radical 211 meaning "teeth" (齒部) is the only one of the 214 Kangxi radicals that is composed of 15 strokes.

In the Kangxi Dictionary there are only 21 characters (out of 40 000) to be found under this radical.

== Evolution ==
Shang dynasty Oracle bone script

Western Zhou Bronze script

Large seal script character

Small seal script character

== Characters with Radical 211 ==
strokes	character
+0	齒 齿^{SC} 歯^{JP}
+1	齓
+2	齔
+3	齕
+4	齖 齗 齘
+5	齙 齚 齛 齜 齝 齞 齟 齠 齡 齢 齣
+6	齤 齥 齦 齧 齨 齩
+7	齪 齫 齬
+8	齭 齮 齯 齰 齱
+9	齲 齳 齴 齵 齶 齷
+10	齸 齹 齺 齻
+13	齼 齽
+20	齾

== Literature ==
- Fazzioli, Edoardo (1987). Chinese calligraphy : from pictograph to ideogram : the history of 214 essential Chinese/Japanese characters. calligraphy by Rebecca Hon Ko. New York: Abbeville Press. ISBN 0-89659-774-1.
- Leyi Li: "Tracing the Roots of Chinese Characters: 500 Cases". Beijing 1993, ISBN 978-7-5619-0204-2
