= Abbeville Publishing Group =

Book publisher in New York, USA

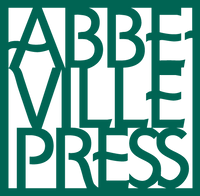
- Abbeville Publishing Group logo
- Founded: 1977
- Founder: Robert E. Abrams and Harry N. Abrams
- Country of origin: United States
- Headquarters location: New York City
- Distribution: Two Rivers Distribution (US); Peribo (Australia)
- Publication types: Books
- Nonfiction topics: Fine art and illustrated books
- Official website: www.abbeville.com

Abbeville Publishing Group is an independent book publishing company specializing in fine art and illustrated books. Based in New York City, Abbeville publishes approximately 40 titles each year and has a catalogue of over 700 titles on art, architecture, design, travel, photography, parenting, and children's books.

The company was founded in 1977 by Robert E. Abrams and his father Harry N. Abrams, who had previously founded the art book publishing company Harry N. Abrams, Inc. in 1949.

Honors and awards given to Abbeville titles include the George Wittenborn Award for Art across America (1991).

== Imprints and divisions ==
Abbeville Publishing Group's major imprint is Abbeville Press, which consists of art and illustrated books for an international readership.

Abbeville Gifts is an imprint which produces desk diaries, stationery, and other printed merchandise.

In 2007, the company announced the launch of Abbeville Family, a new division publishing titles for parents, children, and families. Abbeville Family encompasses the Abbeville Kids imprint, which makes children's illustrated books, as well as the New Father series by Armin Brott.
