= Radical 148 =

Chinese character radical

角
- Radical 148 (U+2F93)
- 角 (U+89D2) "horn"

Pronunciations
- Pinyin: jiǎo
- Bopomofo: ㄐㄧㄠˇ
- Wade–Giles: chiao3
- Cantonese Yale: gok, luhk
- Jyutping: gok3, luk6
- Japanese Kana: カク kaku (on'yomi) つの tsuno / かど kado (kun'yomi)
- Sino-Korean: 각 gak

Names
- Japanese name(s): 角/つの tsuno 角偏/つのへん/かくへん tsunohen/kakuhen
- Hangul: 뿔 ppul

Stroke order animation

Radical 148 or radical horn (角部) meaning "horn" is one of the 20 Kangxi radicals (214 radicals in total) composed of 7 strokes.

In the Kangxi Dictionary, there are 158 characters (out of 49,030) to be found under this radical.

角 is also the 165th indexing component in the Table of Indexing Chinese Character Components predominantly adopted by Simplified Chinese dictionaries published in mainland China.

== Evolution ==
Oracle bone script character

Bronze script character

Large seal script character

Small seal script character

== Derived characters ==
Strokes	Characters
+0	角
+2	觓 觔 (=斤 -> 斤 / 筋 -> 竹)
+4	觕 (=粗 -> 米) 觖 觗 觘 觙
+5	觚 觛 觝 觞^{SC} (=觴)
+6	觜 觟 觠 觡 觢 解 觤 觥 触^{SC/JP} (=觸) 觧 (=解 / 鮮 -> 魚)
+7	觨 觩 觪 觫
+8	觬 觭 觮 觯^{SC} (=觶)
+9	觰 觱
+10	觲 觳
+11	觴 鵤
+12	觵 觶
+13	觷 觸 觹
+14	觺
+15	觻 觼
+16	觽 觾
+18	觿

== Variant forms ==
This radical character has different forms and stroke orders in different languages.

Stroke order in Traditional Chinese

Stroke order in Japanese

Simplified Chinese xin zixing

== Sinogram ==
The radical is also used as an independent Chinese character. It is one of the kyōiku kanji or kanji taught in elementary school in Japan. It is a second grade kanji.

== Literature ==
- Fazzioli, Edoardo (1987). Chinese calligraphy : from pictograph to ideogram : the history of 214 essential Chinese/Japanese characters. calligraphy by Rebecca Hon Ko. New York: Abbeville Press. ISBN 0-89659-774-1.

== See also ==
- Unihan Database - U+89D2
