= Radical 170 =

Chinese character radical

阜
- Radical 170 (U+2FA9)
- 阜 (U+961C) "mound, dam"

Pronunciations
- Pinyin: fù
- Bopomofo: ㄈㄨˋ
- Wade–Giles: fu4
- Cantonese Yale: fau6
- Jyutping: fau6
- Japanese Kana: フ fu / フウ fū (on'yomi) おか oka (kun'yomi)
- Sino-Korean: 부 bu
- Hán-Việt: phụ

Names
- Chinese name(s): (⻖) 左耳旁 zuǒ'ěrpáng
- Japanese name(s): こざとへん kozatohen 岐阜の阜 Gifu no fu
- Hangul: 언덕 eondeok

Stroke order animation

Stroke order of 阝

Radical 170 or radical mound (阜部) meaning "mound" or "dam" is one of the 9 Kangxi radicals (214 radicals in total) composed of 8 strokes. This radical character transforms into 阝 (counted as 3 strokes in Traditional Chinese, 2 strokes in Simplified Chinese) when used as a left component (Not to be confused with 阝 on the right derived from 邑).

In the Kangxi Dictionary, there are 348 characters (out of 49,030) to be found under this radical.

阜 is also the 175th indexing component in the Table of Indexing Chinese Character Components predominantly adopted by Simplified Chinese dictionaries published in mainland China, with 阝 (left) listed as its associated indexing component.

== Evolution ==
Oracle bone script character

Large seal script character

Small seal script character

== Derived characters ==
Strokes	Characters
+0	阜 阝
+2	阞 队^{SC} (=隊)
+3	阠 阡 阢 阣 阤
+4	阥 (=陰) 阦 (=陽) 阧 阨 (=厄 -> 厂) 阩 阪 阫 阬 阭 阮 阯 (=址 -> 土) 阰 阱 防 阳^{SC} (=陽) 阴^{SC} (=陰) 阵^{SC} (=陣) 阶^{SC} (=階)
+5	阷 阸 阹 阺 阻 阼 阽 阾 (=嶺 -> 山 鄰 -> 邑) 阿 陀 陁 陂 陃 附 际^{SC} (=際) 陆^{SC} (=陸) 陇^{SC} (=隴) 陈^{SC} (=陳) 陉^{SC} (=陘)
+6	陊 陋 陌 降 陎 陏 限 陑 陒 陓 陔 陕^{SC} (=陝)
+7	陖 陗 (=峭 -> 山) 陘 陙 陛 陜 (=狹 -> 犬 / 峽 -> 山) 陝 陞 (=升 -> 十) 陟 陠 陡 院 陣 除 陥^{JP} (=陷) 陦^{SC} (=隯) 陧^{SC} (=隉) 陨^{SC} (=隕) 险^{SC} (=險)
+8	陚 陪 陫 陬 陭 陮 陯 陰 陱 陲 陳 陴 陵 陶 陷 陸 陹 険^{JP} (=險)
+9	陻 (=堙 -> 土) 陼 陽 陾 陿 (=狹 -> 犬) 隀 隁 隂 (=陰) 隃 隄 (=堤 -> 土) 隅 隆 隇 隈 隉 隊 隋 隌 隍 階 随^{SC/JP} (=隨) 隐^{SC} (=隱)
+10	隑 隒 隓 隔 隕 隖 (=塢 -> 土) 隗 隘 隙
+11	隚 際 障 隝 (=島 -> 山) 隞 隟 (=隙) 隠^{JP} (=隱) 隡
+12	隢 隣 (=鄰 -> 邑) 隤 隥
+13	隦 隧 隨 隩 險 隫
+14	隬 隭 隮 隯 隰 隱 隲 (=騭 -> 馬)
+15	隳
+16	隴
+17	隵

== Kanji ==
This kanji is one of the 20 kanji added to the Kyoiku kanji or kanji taught in Japanese elementary schools that are found in the names of the following prefectures of Japan. It was added because it is the second character in Gifu (岐阜県).

== Literature ==
- Fazzioli, Edoardo (1987). Chinese calligraphy : from pictograph to ideogram : the history of 214 essential Chinese/Japanese characters. calligraphy by Rebecca Hon Ko. New York: Abbeville Press. ISBN 0-89659-774-1.
- Lunde, Ken (Jan 5, 2009). "Appendix J: Japanese Character Sets" (PDF). CJKV Information Processing: Chinese, Japanese, Korean & Vietnamese Computing (Second ed.). Sebastopol, Calif.: O'Reilly Media. ISBN 978-0-596-51447-1.
