= Radical 10 =

Chinese character radical

儿
- Radical 10 (U+2F09)
- 儿 (U+513F) "legs"

Pronunciations
- Pinyin: ér (SC), rén
- Bopomofo: ㄦˊ (SC), ㄖㄣˊ
- Gwoyeu Romatzyh: erl (SC), ren
- Wade–Giles: êrh^{2} (SC), jên^{2}
- Cantonese Yale: yàhn
- Jyutping: jan4
- Pe̍h-ōe-jī: jî
- Japanese Kana: ジン jin / ニン nin (on'yomi)
- Sino-Korean: 인 in
- Hán-Việt: nhân

Names
- Chinese name(s): 兒字底/儿字底 érzìdǐ
- Japanese name(s): 人繞/にんにょう ninnyō 人足/ひとあしhitoashi
- Hangul: 어진사람 eojinsalam

Stroke order animation

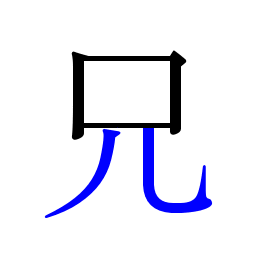
Radical legs as in the character 兄 "elder brother"

Radical 10 or radical legs (儿部) meaning "legs" is one of 23 of the 214 Kangxi radicals that are composed of 2 strokes.

In the Kangxi Dictionary, there are 52 characters (out of 49,030) to be found under this radical.

儿 is also the 14th indexing component in the Table of Indexing Chinese Character Components predominantly adopted by Simplified Chinese dictionaries published in mainland China. In addition, this radical is commonly pronounced ér among Simplified Chinese users as 儿 is the simplified form of 兒 ér. However, the meaning of 儿 as a radical is irrelevant to 兒.

== Evolution ==
Oracle bone script

Shang dynasty Bronze script

Western Zhou bronze script

Large seal script

Small seal script

=== 兒/児/儿 ===
Oracle bone script

Bronze script

Chu slip and silk script

Qin slip script

Large seal script

Small seal script

=== 光 ===
火 (“fire”) + 卩 (“kneeling person”); compare 見 and 頁.

Oracle bone script

Bronze script

Chu slip and silk script

Large seal script

Small seal script

== Derived characters ==
Strokes	Characters
+0	儿
+1	兀
+2	允 兂 (=簪 -> 竹) 元
+3	兄
+4	充 兆 兇 先 光 兊 (=兌) 尧^{SC} (=堯 -> 土)
+5	克 兌 兎^{JP/variant} (=兔) 兏 (=長 -> 長) 児^{JP} (=兒) 兑^{SC/HK} (=兌)
+6	免 兒 兓 兔 兕 兖^{SC/variant} (=兗)
+7	兗 兘 兙
+8	党 (also SC/JP form of 黨 -> 黑) 兛
+9	兜 兝 兞
+10	兟 兠
+11	兡
+12	兢
+14	兣
+18	兤^{GB TC variant}
+19	兤^{Traditional variant}

== Sinogram ==
The radical is also used as an independent Chinese character. It means child, and sometimes simply means erhua phonetically. 兒 is sometimes used to differentiate when it specifically means child and not phonetic use.
