= Radical 174 =

Chinese character radical

靑
- Radical 174 (U+2FAD)
- 靑 (U+9751) "green/blue"

Pronunciations
- Pinyin: qīng
- Bopomofo: ㄑㄧㄥ
- Wade–Giles: ch'ing1
- Cantonese Yale: cheng1, ching1
- Jyutping: ceng1, cing1
- Japanese Kana: セイ sei / ショウ shō (on'yomi) あお ao (kun'yomi)
- Sino-Korean: 청 cheong
- Hán-Việt: thanh

Names
- Japanese name(s): 青/あお ao
- Hangul: 푸를 pureul

Stroke order animation

Radical 174 or radical blue (靑部/青部) meaning "green" or "blue" or "black" (see Distinguishing blue from green in Chinese) is one of the 9 Kangxi radicals (214 radicals in total) composed of 8 strokes. It is also the character representing the color ao in Japanese, a general term covering both blue and green.

In the Kangxi Dictionary, there are 17 characters (out of 49,030) to be found under this radical.

The xin zixing form, 青, is the 168th indexing component in the Table of Indexing Chinese Character Components predominantly adopted by Simplified Chinese dictionaries published in mainland China.

== Evolution ==
A phono-semantic compound of 生 (*sreŋ) and 井 (*tseŋʔ).

Bronze script character

Chu slip and silk script

Shuowen ancient script

Large seal script character

Small seal script character

== Derived characters ==
Strokes	Characters
+0	靑 (=青) 青
+4	靓^{SC} (=靚) 靔^{SC} (=靝=天 -> 大)
+5	靕 靖
+6	靗 靘 静^{SC} (=靜)
+7	靚
+8	靛 靜
+10	靝 (=天 -> 大)

== Variant forms ==
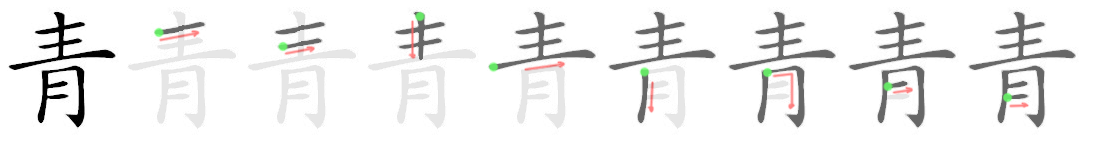
Stroke order in Chinese

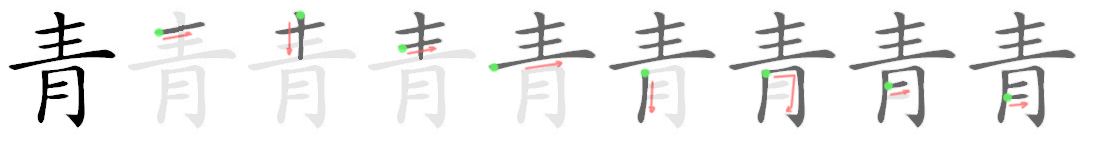
Stroke order in Japanese

This radical character has different forms and stroke orders in different languages and different individual characters.

靑 (lower part is 円) is used in traditional Ming typefaces as well as in the Kangxi Dictionary, but it rarely appears in handwritten scripts compared to 青.

In modern Chinese, mainland China's xin zixing (applied to chiefly Simplified Chinese, but may also be used for Traditional Chinese) and Hong Kong's List of Graphemes of Commonly-Used Chinese Characters (Traditional Chinese) adopted 青 (the lower part's first stroke is vertical) that resembles the written form, while Taiwan's Standard Form of National Characters (Traditional Chinese) adopted a slightly different form, 青 (the lower part is 月 with the first stroke left-falling).

In modern Japanese, jōyō kanji adopts the handwritten form 青 and applies it to printing typefaces, while 靑 is used for hyōgai kanji.

Kangxi Dict. Japanese (hyōgai) Korean	Mainland China Hong Kong Japanese (jōyō)	Taiwan
靑	青	青

== Sinogram ==
The radical is also used as an independent Chinese character. It is one of the kyōiku kanji or kanji taught in elementary school in Japan. It is a first grade kanji.

== Literature ==
- Fazzioli, Edoardo (1987). Chinese calligraphy : from pictograph to ideogram : the history of 214 essential Chinese/Japanese characters. calligraphy by Rebecca Hon Ko. New York: Abbeville Press. ISBN 0-89659-774-1.
- Lunde, Ken (Jan 5, 2009). "Appendix J: Japanese Character Sets" (PDF). CJKV Information Processing: Chinese, Japanese, Korean & Vietnamese Computing (Second ed.). Sebastopol, Calif.: O'Reilly Media. ISBN 978-0-596-51447-1.
