= Radical 113 =

Chinese character radical

示
- Radical 113 (U+2F70)
- 示 (U+793A) "ancestor, veneration"

Pronunciations
- Pinyin: shì
- Bopomofo: ㄕˋ
- Gwoyeu Romatzyh: shyh
- Wade–Giles: shih^{4}
- Cantonese Yale: sih
- Jyutping: si6
- Japanese Kana: シ shi (on'yomi) しめ-す shime-su (kun'yomi)
- Sino-Korean: 시 si

Names
- Chinese name(s): (Left) 示字旁 shìzìpáng (Bottom) 示字底 shìzìdǐ
- Japanese name(s): しめす shimesu 示偏/しめすへん shimesuhen ネ偏/ねへん nehen
- Hangul: 보일 boil

Stroke order animation

Radical 113 or radical spirit (示部), which means ancestor worship is one of the 23 Kangxi radicals composed of 5 strokes.

When appearing at the left side of a character, the radical transforms into 礻 (consisting of 4 strokes) in modern Chinese and Japanese jōyō kanji.

The compound form 礻 always appears in the left half of the characters.

In the Kangxi Dictionary, there are 213 characters (out of 49,030) to be found under this radical.

示 is also the 100th indexing component in the Table of Indexing Chinese Character Components predominantly adopted by Simplified Chinese dictionaries published in mainland China, with the left component form 礻 being its associated indexing component.

The character 示 represents an altar or offering table, the top stroke depicting the offered goods. In the oracle bone script, the table has a T shape.

Semantically, the sign suggests a relation to anything connected with animism in traditional Chinese religion, such as 祭 "to sacrifice, to practice ancestor veneration", ultimately composed of the sign for meat 肉 and the sign for a hand 手 above the altar character, as it iconographically means "hand placing meat on an altar". The sign 祟 for "evil spirit" originally referred to misfortune caused by malevolent spirits.

In 禁 (jìn) "to forbid, restrict, restrain", the 林 (lín) above the radical has only phonetic significance (rebus writing). Similarly, 神 "spirit" has radical 113 plus 申 (shēn) as a phonetic marker. 祖 "ancestor" on the other hand has radical 113 plus 且, a pictograph of a stand with shelves for offerings to ancestors.

Some signs including the radical have no connection with spirits or animism and are placed in the category purely on formal grounds, such as 票 "ticket" which originally had radical 火 rather than 示.

== Evolution ==
Early forms of 示, 丅 and 主 are T-shaped. They depict an altar.

Shang dynasty Oracle bone script

Shang dynasty Oracle bone script variant

Shang dynasty Bronze script

Chu slip and silk script

Shuowen ancient script

Large seal script character

Small seal script character

== Derived characters ==
Strokes	Characters
+0	示 礻^{Component}
+1	礼^{SC/JP} (=禮)
+2	礽
+3	社 礿 祀 祁 祂 祃^{SC} (=禡)
+4	祄 祅 (=妖 -> 女) 祆 祇 祈 祉 祊 祋 祌 祍 祎^{SC} (=禕) 视^{SC} (=視)
+5	祏 祐 祑 祒 祓 祔 祕 (=秘 -> 禾) 祖 祗 祘 (=算 -> 竹 / 蒜 -> 艸) 祙 祚 祛 祜 祝 神 祟 祠 祡 祢 (also SC form of 禰)
+6	祣 祤 祥 祧 票 祩 祪 祫 祬 祭 祮 祯^{SC} (=禎)
+7	祦 祰 祱 祲 祳 祴 祵 祶 祷^{SC/JP} (=禱) 祸^{SC} (=禍) 禄^{SC} (=祿) 視
+8	祹 祺 祻 祼 祽 祾 祿 禀^{SC} (=稟) 禁 禂 禃 禅^{SC} (=禪) 禆
+9	禅^{JP} (=禪) 禇 禈 禉 禊 禋 禌 禍 禎 福 禐 禑 禒 禓 禔 禕 禖 禗 禘 禙
+10	禚 禛 禜 禝 禞 禟 禠 禡 禢 禣
+11	禤 禥 (=祺) 禦
+12	禧 禨 禩 (=祀) 禪 禫
+13	禬 禭 禮 禯
+14	禰 禱
+15	禲
+17	禳 禴
+18	禵
+19	禶 禷

== Variant forms ==
Stroke order of the left component form 礻

This radical takes different forms in different languages or characters.

When used as a left component, traditionally, only ⺬ was used in printing, while 礻 was overwhelmingly preferred in writing regular script. In the Kangxi Dictionary, ⺬ was chosen as the standard form.

In mainland China, after the adoption of simplified Chinese characters and xin zixing (new character forms), 礻, which used to be a handwriting form, became the standard xin zixing printing form (e.g. 神, 福). This change also applies to China's Guo Biao (national standard) Traditional Chinese characters used chiefly in printing Chinese classics (e.g. 禪). 礻 is also chosen as the standard form in the Taiwan standard and the Hong Kong standard of Traditional Chinese, though ⺬ (traditional) and 礻 (the first stroke is vertical) are also widely used in Traditional Chinese publications.

In Japan, 礻 was adopted as the standard form of in shinjitai, and the difference between 礻 and ⺬ is treated as the difference between the new and old forms (e.g. 禪→禅). However, this simplification applies only to jōyō kanji. While JIS X 0208:1983 simplified some hyōgai kanji with the left component ⺬ (e.g. 祇), this change was not in conformity with the Publishing Standard Glyphs of hyōgai kanji released by the National Language Council in 2000 and was undone in later versions of JIS. Hyōgai kanji with the simplified form 礻 are often seen as extended shinjitai. Both forms are acceptable when writing hyōgai kanji, but only the simplified form is recognized as the standard form in jōyō kanji.

The left component form is not simplified in Korean hanja (e.g. 神, 福).

Kangxi Dictionary Japanese hyōgai kanji Korean	Modern Chinese	Japanese jōyō kanji Trad. Chinese nonstandard
⺬	礻	礻

The radical also has different variants when appearing independently or at the bottom of a character.

In the Kangxi Dictionary, 示 as an independent character does not have a hook in its third stroke, while the hook exists when the radical is used as a component. Both forms have traditionally been widely used for printing and handwriting, while in modern times, different authorities have prescribed different forms as their standards. The hook does not exist in Taiwan's Standard Form of National Characters, exists in mainland China's Guo Biao standard, Japanese kanji, and Korean hanja.

Kangxi Dictionary	Chinese (Mainland China) Japanese Korean	Chinese (Taiwan)
示 禁	示 禁	示 禁

== As a Hanzi ==
The radical is also used as an independent hanzi and is taught as a fifth-grade kyōiku kanji.

== See also ==
- Ancestor veneration in China

== Literature ==
- Fazzioli, Edoardo (1987). Chinese calligraphy : from pictograph to ideogram : the history of 214 essential Chinese/Japanese characters. calligraphy by Rebecca Hon Ko. New York: Abbeville Press. ISBN 0-89659-774-1.
- Leyi Li: “Tracing the Roots of Chinese Characters: 500 Cases”. Beijing 1993, ISBN 978-7-5619-0204-2
