= Radical 149 =

Chinese character radical

言
- Radical 149 (U+2F94)
- 言 (U+8A00) "speech"

Pronunciations
- Pinyin: yán
- Bopomofo: ㄧㄢˊ
- Wade–Giles: yen2
- Cantonese Yale: yìhn
- Jyutping: jin4
- Japanese Kana: ゲン gen / ゴン gon (on'yomi) い-う i-u / こと koto (kun'yomi)
- Sino-Korean: 언 eon

Names
- Chinese name(s): (Left) 言字旁 yánzìpáng (Bottom) 言字底 yánzìdǐ
- Japanese name(s): 言偏/ごんべん gonben
- Hangul: 말씀 malsseum

Stroke order animation

Radical 149 or radical speech (言部) meaning "speech" is one of the 20 Kangxi radicals (214 radicals in total) composed of 7 strokes.

In the Kangxi Dictionary, there are 861 characters (out of 49,030) to be found under this radical.

言 is also the 166th indexing component in the Table of Indexing Chinese Character Components predominantly adopted by Simplified Chinese dictionaries published in mainland China, with the simplified component form 讠 listed as its associated indexing component.

== Evolution ==
Either 口+辛 or 舌 with top bar. Compare 音.

Oracle bone script character

Bronze script character

Large seal script character

Small seal script character

== Derived characters ==
Strokes	Characters (言 訁)	Characters (讠)
+0	言 訁^{Component}	讠^{SC Component} (=訁)
+2	訂 訃 訄 訅 訆 (=叫 -> 口) 訇 計	计^{SC} (=計) 订^{SC} (=訂) 讣^{SC} (=訃) 认^{SC} (=認) 讥^{SC} (=譏)
+3	訉 訊 訋 訌 訍 討 訏 訐 訑 訒 訓 訔 訕 訖 託 記 訙 訚^{SC} (=誾)	讦^{SC} (=訐) 讧^{SC} (=訌) 讨^{SC} (=討) 让^{SC} (=讓) 讪^{SC} (=訕) 讫^{SC} (=訖) 讬^{SC nonstandard} (=託) 训^{SC} (=訓) 议^{SC} (=議) 讯^{SC} (=訊) 记^{SC} (=記) 讱^{SC} (=訒)
+4	訛 訜 訝 訞 訟 訠 (=矧 -> 矢) 訡 (=吟 -> 口) 訢 訣 訤 訥 訦 訧 訨 訩 訪 訫 訬 設 訮 訯 訰 許 訲 訳^{JP} (=譯)	讲^{SC} (=講) 讳^{SC} (=諱) 讴^{SC} (=謳) 讵^{SC} (=詎) 讶^{SC} (=訝) 讷^{SC} (=訥) 许^{SC} (=許) 讹^{SC} (=訛) 论^{SC} (=論) 讻^{SC} (=訩) 讼^{SC} (=訟) 讽^{SC} (=諷) 设^{SC} (=設) 访^{SC} (=訪) 诀^{SC} (=訣)
+5	訴 訵 訶 訷 訸 訹 診 註 証^{JP} (=證) 訽 訾 訿 詀 詁 詂 詃 詄 詅 詆 詇 詈 詉 詊 詋 (=咒 -> 口) 詌 詍 詎 詏 詐 詑 詒 詓 詔 評 詖 詗 詘 詙 詚 詛 詜 詝 詞 詟^{SC} (=讋) 詠	证^{SC} (=證) 诂^{SC} (=詁) 诃^{SC} (=訶) 评^{SC} (=評) 诅^{SC} (=詛) 识^{SC} (=識) 诇^{SC} (=詗) 诈^{SC} (=詐) 诉^{SC} (=訴) 诊^{SC} (=診) 诋^{SC} (=詆) 诌^{SC} (=謅) 词^{SC} (=詞) 诎^{SC} (=詘) 诏^{SC} (=詔) 诐^{SC} (=詖) 译^{SC} (=譯) 诒^{SC} (=詒)
+6	詡 詢 詣 詤 詥 試 詧 (=察 -> 宀) 詨 詩 詪 詫 詬 詭 詮 詯 詰 話 該 詳 詴 詵 詶 (=酬 -> 酉 / 籌 -> 竹) 詷 詸 (=謎) 詹 詺 詻 詼 詽 (=訮) 詾 (=訩) 詿 誀 誁 誂 誃 誄 誅 誆 誇 誈 誉^{SC/JP} (=譽) 誊^{SC} (=謄) 誠	诓^{SC} (=誆) 诔^{SC} (=誄) 试^{SC} (=試) 诖^{SC} (=詿) 诗^{SC} (=詩) 诘^{SC} (=詰) 诙^{SC} (=詼) 诚^{SC} (=誠) 诛^{SC} (=誅) 诜^{SC} (=詵) 话^{SC} (=話) 诞^{SC} (=誕) 诟^{SC} (=詬) 诠^{SC} (=詮) 诡^{SC} (=詭) 询^{SC} (=詢) 诣^{SC} (=詣) 诤^{SC} (=諍) 该^{SC} (=該) 详^{SC} (=詳) 诧^{SC} (=詫) 诨^{SC} (=諢) 诩^{SC} (=詡)
+7	誋 誌 認 誎 誏 誐 誑 誒 誓 誔 誕 誖 (=悖 -> 心) 誗 誘 誙 誚 誛 誜 誝 語 誟 誡 誢 誣 誤 誥 誦 誧 誨 誩 說 誫 説^{JP/HK} (=說) 読^{JP} (=讀) 誮	诪^{SC} (=譸) 诫^{SC} (=誡) 诬^{SC} (=誣) 语^{SC} (=語) 诮^{SC} (=誚) 误^{SC} (=誤) 诰^{SC} (=誥) 诱^{SC} (=誘) 诲^{SC} (=誨) 诳^{SC} (=誑) 说^{SC} (=說) 诵^{SC} (=誦) 诶^{SC} (=誒)
+8	誯 誰 誱 課 誳 誴 誵 誶 誷 誸 誹 誺 誻 誼 誽 誾 調 諀 諁 (=啜 -> 口) 諂 諃 諄 諅 諆 談 諈 諉 諊 請 諌 諍 諎 諏 諐 (=愆 -> 心) 諑 諒 諓 諔 諕 論 諗 諘 諙 諚 諩	请^{SC} (=請) 诸^{SC} (=諸) 诹^{SC} (=諏) 诺^{SC} (=諾) 读^{SC} (=讀) 诼^{SC} (=諑) 诽^{SC} (=誹) 课^{SC} (=課) 诿^{SC} (=諉) 谀^{SC} (=諛) 谁^{SC} (=誰) 谂^{SC} (=諗) 调^{SC} (=調) 谄^{SC} (=諂) 谅^{SC} (=諒) 谆^{SC} (=諄) 谇^{SC} (=誶) 谈^{SC} (=談) 谉^{SC} (=讅) 谊^{SC} (=誼)
+9	諛 諜 諝 諞 諟 諠 諡 (=謚) 諢 諣 諤 諥 諦 諧 諨 諪 諫 諬 (=啟 -> 攴) 諭 諮 諯 諰 諱 諲 諳 諴 諵 諶 諷 諸 諹 諺 諻 諼 諽 諾 諿 謀 謁 謂 謃 謡^{JP} (=謠)	谋^{SC} (=謀) 谌^{SC} (=諶) 谍^{SC} (=諜) 谎^{SC} (=謊) 谏^{SC} (=諫) 谐^{SC} (=諧) 谑^{SC} (=謔) 谒^{SC} (=謁) 谓^{SC} (=謂) 谔^{SC} (=諤) 谕^{SC} (=諭) 谖^{SC} (=諼) 谗^{SC} (=讒) 谘^{SC} (=諮) 谙^{SC} (=諳) 谚^{SC} (=諺) 谛^{SC} (=諦) 谜^{SC} (=謎) 谝^{SC} (=諞) 谞^{SC} (=諝)
+10	謄 謅 謆 謇 謈 謉 謊 謋 謌 (=歌 -> 欠) 謍 謎 謏 謐 謑 謒 謓 謔 謕 謖 謗 謘 謙 謚 講 謜 謝 謞 謟 謠 謡 (=謠) 謢 (=護)	谟^{SC} (=謨) 谠^{SC} (=讜) 谡^{SC} (=謖) 谢^{SC} (=謝) 谣^{SC} (=謠) 谤^{SC} (=謗) 谥^{SC} (=謚) 谦^{SC} (=謙) 谧^{SC} (=謐)
+11	謣 謤 謥 謦 謧 謨 謩 (=謨) 謪 謫 謬 謭 (=譾) 謮 謯 謰 謱 謲 謳 謴 謵 謶 謷 謸 謹 謺 謻 謼 謽 謾	谨^{SC} (=謹) 谩^{SC} (=謾) 谪^{SC} (=謫) 谫^{SC} (=譾) 谬^{SC} (=謬)
+12	謿 (=嘲 -> 口) 譀 譁 (=嘩 -> 口) 譂 譃 譄 譅 譆 譇 譈 證 譊 譋 (=讕) 譌 (=訛/詭) 譎 譏 譐 譑 譒 譓 譔 譕 譖 譗 識 譙 譚 譛 (=譖) 譜	谭^{SC} (=譚) 谮^{SC} (=譖) 谯^{SC} (=譙) 谰^{SC} (=讕) 谱^{SC} (=譜) 谲^{SC} (=譎)
+13	譍 (=應 -> 心) 譝 譞 譟 (=噪 -> 口) 譠 譡 (=讜) 譢 譣 譤 譥 警 譧 譨 譩 譪 (=藹 -> 艸) 譫 譬 譭 譮 譯 議 譱 (=善 -> 口) 譲^{JP} (=讓)	谳^{SC} (=讞) 谴^{SC} (=譴) 谵^{SC} (=譫)
+14	譳 譴 譵 (=懟 -> 心) 譶 護 譸 譹 譺 譻 (=嚶 -> 口) 譼 譽	
+15	譾 譿 讀 讁 (=謫) 讂 讃^{JP} (=讚) 讄 讅	
+16	讆 讇 (=諂) 讈 讉 變 讋 讌 讍 讎 讏 (=讆) 讐^{JP} (=讎)	
+17	讑 讒 讓 讔 讕 讖	谶^{SC} (=讖)
+18	讗 讘 讙	
+19	讚 讛	
+20	讜 讝 讞	
+22	讟	

== Variant forms ==
The first stroke of this radical character is printed differently in different languages, while in writing, the slant dot form is overwhelmingly preferred.

Kangxi Dict. Japanese Korean	Trad. Chinese Simp. Chinese
言	言

In addition, when used as a left component, this character is simplified as 讠 in Simplified Chinese.

== Sinogram ==
The radical is also used as an independent Chinese character. It is one of the kyōiku kanji or kanji taught in elementary school in Japan. It is a second grade kanji.

== Literature ==
- Fazzioli, Edoardo (1987). Chinese calligraphy : from pictograph to ideogram : the history of 214 essential Chinese/Japanese characters. calligraphy by Rebecca Hon Ko. New York: Abbeville Press. ISBN 0-89659-774-1.
- Lunde, Ken (Jan 5, 2009). "Appendix J: Japanese Character Sets" (PDF). CJKV Information Processing: Chinese, Japanese, Korean & Vietnamese Computing (Second ed.). Sebastopol, Calif.: O'Reilly Media. ISBN 978-0-596-51447-1.
