= Radical 8 =

Chinese character radical

亠
- Radical 8 (U+2F07)
- 亠 (U+4EA0) "lid, head"

Pronunciations
- Pinyin: tóu (=頭/头)
- Bopomofo: ㄊㄡˊ
- Gwoyeu Romatzyh: tour
- Wade–Giles: tʻou^{2}
- Cantonese Yale: tàuh
- Jyutping: tau4
- Pe̍h-ōe-jī: thâu (col.) thô͘ (lit.)
- Japanese Kana: トウ tō (on'yomi)
- Sino-Korean: 두 do
- Hán-Việt: đầu

Names
- Chinese name(s): 點橫/点横 diǎnhéng 文字頭/文字头 wénzìtóu
- Japanese name(s): 鍋蓋/なべぶた nabebuta 卦算冠/けいさんかんむり kēsankanmuri
- Hangul: 돼지해머리 dwaejihaemeori

Stroke order animation

Radical 8 or radical lid (亠部), whose meaning as an independent word is unknown, but is often interpreted to be a "lid" when used as a radical. Of the 214 Kangxi radicals, Radical 8 is one of 23 which are composed of 2 strokes.

In the Kangxi Dictionary, there are 38 characters (out of 49,030) to be found under this radical.

亠 is also the 17th indexing component in the Table of Indexing Chinese Character Components predominantly adopted by Simplified Chinese dictionaries published in mainland China.

== Evolution ==
Small seal script character

== Derived characters ==
Strokes	Characters
+0	亠 (component only)
+1	亡
+2	六 卞 亢 亣
+4	交 亥 亦 产^{SC} (=產 -> 生)
+5	亨 亩^{SC} (=畝 -> 田) 亪
+6	享 京
+7	亭 亮 亯 亰 (=京) 亱 (=夜 -> 夕) 亲^{SC} (=親 -> 見)
+8	亳
+10	亴 亵^{SC} (=褻 -> 衣)
+11	亶 亷 (=廉 -> 广)
+14	亸^{SC} (=嚲 -> 口)
+19	亹

== Variant forms ==
There is a difference in Japanese and Chinese in printing typefaces for this radical. Traditionally, a short vertical line on top of the horizontal line was used in printing, while a slanted dash is preferred in handwriting.

The vertical dot form is used in the Kangxi Dictionary, modern Japanese and Korean typefaces. In Mainland China, Taiwan, and Hong Kong, a slanted dot on top of the horizontal line is the standard form, though the traditional form with a vertical dot is also widely used in Traditional Chinese typefaces and in some cases Simplified Chinese typefaces.

Both forms are acceptable in handwriting in each language.

Kangxi Dictionary Japan Korea	Mainland China Taiwan Hong Kong
亠	亠

== Literature ==
- Fazzioli, Edoardo (1987). Chinese calligraphy : from pictograph to ideogram : the history of 214 essential Chinese/Japanese characters. calligraphy by Rebecca Hon Ko. New York: Abbeville Press. ISBN 0-89659-774-1.
- Leyi Li: "Tracing the Roots of Chinese Characters: 500 Cases". Beijing 1993, ISBN 978-7-5619-0204-2
