= Radical 55 =

Chinese character radical

廾
- Radical 55 (U+2F36)
- 廾 (U+5EFE) "two hands, arch"

Pronunciations
- Pinyin: gǒng
- Bopomofo: ㄍㄨㄥˇ
- Wade–Giles: kung3
- Cantonese Yale: gúng
- Jyutping: gung2
- Pe̍h-ōe-jī: kióng
- Japanese Kana: キョウ kyō (on'yomi)
- Sino-Korean: 공 gong

Names
- Chinese name(s): 弄字底 nòngzìdǐ
- Japanese name(s): 拱き/こまぬき komanuki 廿脚/にじゅうあし nijūashi
- Hangul: 들 teul

Stroke order animation

Radical 55 or radical two hands (廾部) meaning "two hands", "twenty" or "arch" is one of the 31 Kangxi radicals (214 radicals in total) composed of three strokes.

In the Kangxi Dictionary, there are 50 characters (out of 49,030) to be found under this radical.

廾 is also the 32nd indexing component in the Table of Indexing Chinese Character Components predominantly adopted by Simplified Chinese dictionaries published in mainland China.

== Evolution ==
=== 廾 ===
Two hands (又). Sometimes transforms to 八 at the bottom of a character e.g. 兵, 共 and 具. Unrelated to 升.

Oracle bone script character

Bronze script character

Large seal script character

Small seal script character

=== 廿 (twenty) ===
Oracle bone script character

Bronze script character

Large seal script character

Small seal script character

== Derived characters ==
Strokes	Characters
+0	廾
+1	廿 开^{SC} (=開 -> 門)
+2	弁 (also JP form of 辨 -> 辛 / 瓣 -> 瓜 / 辯 -> 辛)
+3	异^{SC/variant} (=異 -> 田)
+4	弃^{SC/variant} (=棄 -> 木) 弄 弅
+5	弆
+6	弇 弈
+7	弉
+12	弊

== Literature ==
- Fazzioli, Edoardo (1987). Chinese calligraphy : from pictograph to ideogram : the history of 214 essential Chinese/Japanese characters. calligraphy by Rebecca Hon Ko. New York: Abbeville Press. ISBN 0-89659-774-1.
- Lunde, Ken (Jan 5, 2009). "Appendix J: Japanese Character Sets" (PDF). CJKV Information Processing: Chinese, Japanese, Korean & Vietnamese Computing (Second ed.). Sebastopol, Calif.: O'Reilly Media. ISBN 978-0-596-51447-1.
