= Radical 12 =

Chinese character radical

八
- Radical 12 (U+2F0B)
- 八 (U+516B) "eight"

Pronunciations
- Pinyin: bā
- Bopomofo: ㄅㄚ
- Gwoyeu Romatzyh: ba
- Wade–Giles: pa^{1}
- Cantonese Yale: baat
- Jyutping: baat3
- Pe̍h-ōe-jī: pat
- Japanese Kana: ハチ hachi (on'yomi)
- Sino-Korean: 팔 pal
- Hán-Việt: bát

Names
- Chinese name(s): (Top) 八字頭/八字头 bāzìtóu (Bottom) 八字底 bāzìdǐ (Top, inversed) 倒八字 dàobāzì
- Japanese name(s): (Top) 八頭/はちがしら hachigashira ハ ha (kana)
- Hangul: 여덟 yeodeol

Stroke order animation

Radical 12 or radical eight (八部), meaning eight or all, is one of 23 of the 214 Kangxi radicals that are composed of two strokes. "八" is two bent lines that signal divide. Eight is the single-digit number that can be divided by two the greatest number of times.

In the Kangxi Dictionary, there are 44 characters (out of 49,030) to be found under this radical.

八 is also the 11th indexing component in the Table of Indexing Chinese Character Components predominantly adopted by Simplified Chinese dictionaries published in mainland China. 丷 is an associated indexing component affiliated to the principal component 八.

== Evolution ==
Oracle bone script character

Bronze script character

Large seal script character

Small seal script character

== Derived characters ==
Strokes	Characters
+0	八
+2	公 六 兮 兯^{KO}
+3	兰^{SC} (=蘭 -> 艸)
+4	共 兲 (=天 -> 大) 关^{SC} (=關 -> 門) 兴^{SC} (=興 -> 臼)
+5	㒵 (=貌 -> 豸) 㒶 (=公) 㒷 (=興 -> 臼) 兵
+6	其 具 典
+7	㒸 兹^{SC/variant} (=茲 -> 艸) 养^{SC} (=養 -> 食)
+8	兺^{KO} 兼
+9	兽^{SC} (=獸 -> 犬)
+11	兾/兾 (=冀) 兿 (=藝 -> 艸)
+14	冀
+16	冁^{SC} (=囅 -> 口)
+18	㒹 (=顛 -> 頁)

== Variant forms ==
There is a design nuance in different printing typefaces for this radical. In the Kangxi Dictionary and in Korean hanja, there is a short horizontal line at the beginning of the character's second stroke. This short line does not exist in most Simplified Chinese fonts used in mainland China, except for a few cases like the character 八 as in the Emblem of the People's Liberation Army. It exists in most but not all Traditional Chinese fonts. In Japanese typeface, the presence of the short line depends on each typeface's design.

The short horizontal line exists only in printing typeface, not in any handwriting form.

with a short line	without the short line
八	八

== Literature ==
- Fazzioli, Edoardo (1987). Chinese calligraphy : from pictograph to ideogram : the history of 214 essential Chinese/Japanese characters. calligraphy by Rebecca Hon Ko. New York: Abbeville Press. ISBN 0-89659-774-1.
- Leyi Li: “Tracing the Roots of Chinese Characters: 500 Cases”. Beijing 1993, ISBN 978-7-5619-0204-2
- KangXi: page 126, character 26
- Dai Kanwa Jiten: character 1450
- Dae Jaweon: page 274, character 13
- Hanyu Da Zidian: volume 1, page 241, character 3
