= Radical 194 =

Chinese character radical

鬼
- Radical 194 (U+2FC1)
- 鬼 (U+9B3C) "ghost, demon"

Pronunciations
- Pinyin: guǐ
- Bopomofo: ㄍㄨㄟˇ
- Wade–Giles: kuei3
- Cantonese Yale: gwai2
- Jyutping: gwai2
- Japanese Kana: キ ki (on'yomi) おに oni (kun'yomi)
- Sino-Korean: 귀 gwi
- Hán-Việt: quỷ, khuỷu, quẽ, quỉ

Names
- Japanese name(s): 鬼/おに oni 鬼繞/きにょう kinyō
- Hangul: 귀신 gwisin

Stroke order animation

Radical 194 or radical ghost (鬼部) meaning "ghost" or "demon" is one of the 8 Kangxi radicals (214 radicals in total) composed of 10 strokes.

鬼 (9 strokes in Simplified Chinese) is also the 184th indexing component in the Table of Indexing Chinese Character Components predominantly adopted by Simplified Chinese dictionaries published in mainland China.

== Evolution ==
Oracle bone script character

Bronze script character

Large seal script character

Small seal script character

The character is historically composed of 儿 "legs", 田 representing a large demon's head and a curl looking similar to 厶 taken to represent a swirl of vapour, or a demon's tail.

The character can be traced to the oracle bone script, where it depicts a man kneeling on a monster head.

== Derived characters ==
Strokes	Characters
+0	鬼
+3	鬽 (=魅)
+4	鬾 鬿 魀 魁 魂
+5	魃 魄 魅 魆
+6	魇^{SC} (=魘)
+7	魈 魉^{SC} (=魎)
+8	魊 魋 魌 魍 魎 魏
+10	魐
+11	魑 魒 魓 魔
+12	魕 魖
+14	魗 魘 魙

Most of the characters derived from the radical have meanings related to ghosts or souls, including 魔 "devil, demon", 魑 "black magic", 魘 "nightmare", 魄 "soul". In some signs, however, the radical is present purely as a phonetic marker, for example in 魏, the State of Wei during the Spring and Autumn period.

== Variant forms ==
Kangxi Dict. Trad. Chinese (TW/HK/MO) Japanese Korean	Mainland China
鬼	鬼

== Literature ==
- Fazzioli, Edoardo (1987). Chinese calligraphy : from pictograph to ideogram : the history of 214 essential Chinese/Japanese characters. calligraphy by Rebecca Hon Ko. New York: Abbeville Press. ISBN 0-89659-774-1.
- Li, Leyi: “Tracing the Roots of Chinese Characters: 500 Cases”. Beijing 1993, ISBN 978-7-5619-0204-2
- Harbaugh, Rick, Chinese Characters: A Genealogy and Dictionary, Yale University Press (1998), ISBN 978-0-9660750-0-7.
- Childs-Johnson, Elizabeth (江伊莉), 甲骨文的“鬼”与假面具 (The Gui-Spirit in Oracle Bone Inscriptions), International Conference Celebrating the 95th Anniversary of the Discovery of Oracle Bone Inscriptions", Anyang, China, 1994.

== See also ==
- Ghosts in Chinese culture
- Oni
