= Radical 41 =

Chinese character radical

寸
- Radical 41 (U+2F28)
- 寸 (U+5BF8) "thumb, inch"

Pronunciations
- Pinyin: cùn
- Bopomofo: ㄘㄨㄣˋ
- Wade–Giles: ts'un4
- Cantonese Yale: chyun
- Jyutping: cyun3
- Pe̍h-ōe-jī: chhùn
- Japanese Kana: スン sun / ソン son (on'yomi)
- Sino-Korean: 촌 chon

Names
- Chinese name(s): 寸字旁 cùnzìpáng
- Japanese name(s): 寸/すん sun
- Hangul: 마디 madi

Stroke order animation

Radical 41 or radical inch (寸部) meaning "thumb" or "inch" is one of the 31 Kangxi radicals (214 radicals total) composed of three strokes.

In the Kangxi Dictionary, there are 40 characters (out of 49,030) to be found under this radical.

寸 is also the 31st indexing component in the Table of Indexing Chinese Character Components predominantly adopted by Simplified Chinese dictionaries published in mainland China.

== Evolution ==
A hand (又) with a line; unrelated to 斗.

Bronze script

Qin slip script

Large seal script

Small seal script

== Derived characters ==
| Strokes | Characters |
|---|---|
| +0 | 寸 |
| +2 | 对^{SC} (=對) |
| +3 | 寺 寻^{SC} (=尋) 导^{SC} (=導) |
| +4 | 寽 対^{JP} (=對) 寿^{SC/JP} (=壽 -> 士) |
| +5 | 尀 (=叵 -> 口) |
| +6 | 封 専^{JP} (=專) |
| +7 | 尃 射 尅 (=剋 -> 刀) 将^{SC/JP} (=將) |
| +8 | 將 專 尉 |
| +9 | 尊 尋 尌 |
| +11 | 對 |
| +12 | 導 |

== Sinogram ==
The radical is also used as an independent Chinese character. It is one of the kyōiku kanji or kanji taught in elementary school in Japan. It is a fifth grade kanji.

== See also ==
- Cun (unit)

== Literature ==
- Fazzioli, Edoardo (1987). Chinese calligraphy : from pictograph to ideogram : the history of 214 essential Chinese/Japanese characters. calligraphy by Rebecca Hon Ko. New York: Abbeville Press. ISBN 0-89659-774-1.
- Lunde, Ken (Jan 5, 2009). "Appendix J: Japanese Character Sets" (PDF). CJKV Information Processing: Chinese, Japanese, Korean & Vietnamese Computing (Second ed.). Sebastopol, Calif.: O'Reilly Media. ISBN 978-0-596-51447-1.
