= Radical 134 =

Chinese character radical

臼
- Radical 134 (U+2F85)
- 臼 (U+81FC) "mortar, joint"

Pronunciations
- Pinyin: jiù
- Bopomofo: ㄐㄧㄡˋ
- Gwoyeu Romatzyh: jiow
- Wade–Giles: chiu^{4}
- Cantonese Yale: káuh, kau
- Jyutping: kau5, kau3
- Japanese Kana: キュウ kyū (on'yomi) うす usu (kun'yomi)
- Sino-Korean: 구 gu

Names
- Japanese name(s): 臼/うす usu
- Hangul: 절구 jeolgu

Stroke order animation

Radical 134 or radical mortar (臼部) meaning "mortar" or "joint" is one of the 29 Kangxi radicals (214 radicals in total) composed of 6 strokes.

In the Kangxi Dictionary, there are 71 characters (out of 49,030) to be found under this radical.

臼 is also the 136th indexing component in the Table of Indexing Chinese Character Components predominantly adopted by Simplified Chinese dictionaries published in mainland China, with 𦥑 being its associated indexing component.

== Evolution ==
Unrelated to 鼠 ("rat")

Small seal script character

== Derived characters ==
| Strokes | Characters |
|---|---|
| +0 | 臼 𦥑 |
| +2 | 臽 臾 |
| +3 | 臿 |
| +4 | 舀 舁 |
| +5 | 舂 |
| +6 | 舃 (=舄) 舄 |
| +7 | 舅 |
| +8 | 與 |
| +9 | 興 |
| +10 | 舆^{SC} (=輿 -> 車) 舉 |
| +12 | 舊 |
| +13 | 舋 (=釁 -> 酉) |

== Literature ==
- Fazzioli, Edoardo (1987). Chinese calligraphy : from pictograph to ideogram : the history of 214 essential Chinese/Japanese characters. calligraphy by Rebecca Hon Ko. New York: Abbeville Press. ISBN 0-89659-774-1.
- Lunde, Ken (Jan 5, 2009). "Appendix J: Japanese Character Sets" (PDF). CJKV Information Processing: Chinese, Japanese, Korean & Vietnamese Computing (Second ed.). Sebastopol, Calif.: O'Reilly Media. ISBN 978-0-596-51447-1.
