= Radical 173 =

Chinese character radical

雨
- Radical 173 (U+2FAC)
- 雨 (U+96E8) "rain"

Pronunciations
- Pinyin: yǔ
- Bopomofo: ㄩˇ
- Wade–Giles: yü3
- Cantonese Yale: yu5
- Jyutping: jyu5, jyu6
- Japanese Kana: ウ u (on'yomi) あめ ame (kun'yomi)
- Sino-Korean: 우 u
- Hán-Việt: vũ

Names
- Chinese name(s): 雨字頭/雨字头 yǔzìtóu
- Japanese name(s): 雨冠/あめかんむり amekanmuri
- Hangul: 비 bi

Stroke order animation

Radical 173 or radical rain (雨部) which means "rain" is one of the 9 Kangxi radicals (214 radicals in total) composed of 8 strokes. This radical character transforms into ⻗ when used as an upper component.

In the Kangxi Dictionary, there are 298 characters (out of 49,030) to be found under this radical.

雨 is also the 170th indexing component in the Table of Indexing Chinese Character Components predominantly adopted by Simplified Chinese dictionaries published in mainland China, with the component form ⻗ listed as its associated indexing component.

== Evolution ==
Shang dynasty Oracle bone script

Western Zhou Bronze script

Warring States period bronze script

Chu slip and silk script

Qin slip script

Shuowen ancient script

Large seal script character

Small seal script character

== Derived characters ==
Strokes	Characters
+0	雨
+3	雩 雪 雫
+4	雬 雭 雮 雯 雰 雱 雲 雳^{SC} (=靂)
+5	雴 雵 零 雷 雸 雹 雺 電 雼 雽 雾^{SC} (=霧)
+6	雿 需 霁^{SC} (=霽)
+7	霂 霃 霄 霅 霆 震 霈 霉^{SC} (also SC form of 黴 → 黑) 霊^{JP} (=靈)
+8	霋 霌 霍 霎 霏 霐 霑 霒 (=𩃬) 霓 霔 霕 霖 霗 (=零)
+9	霘 霙 霚 (=霧) 霛 (=靈) 霜 霝 霞 霟 霠
+10	霡^{SC} (=霢) 霢 霣 霤 霥
+11	霦 霧 霨 霩 霪 霫 霬 霭^{SC} (=靄)
+12	霮 霯 霰 霱 露 霳 霴
+13	霵 霶 霷 霸 霹 霺 (=溦 -> 水) 霻
+14	霼 霽 霾 霿 靀 (=濛 -> 水)
+15	靁 (=雷)
+16	靂 靃 靄 靅 靆 靇 靈
+17	靉
+18	靊
+19	靋 靌 (=寶 -> 宀) 靍 (=鶴 -> 鳥) 靎
+21	靏
+31	靐

== Variant forms ==
This radical is printed and written differently in modern Traditional Chinese than in other languages. In Chinese as used in Mainland China (whether Simplified or Traditional) and Japanese, the four dots in the character are almost identical, while in modern standard Traditional Chinese as used outside the mainland the four dots point inwards to the center of the character, despite the former form is also widely used in Traditional Chinese publications.

Printing forms
Japanese	Mainland China	Taiwan, Hong Kong
雨 雲	雨 雲	雨 雲

Handwritten forms

Independent character as used in Simplified Chinese and Japanese

Independent character as used in Traditional Chinese

Component form as used in Simplified Chinese and Japanese

Component form as used in Simplified Chinese and Japanese (alternative)

Component form as used in Traditional Chinese

== Hanzi ==
This character is a first grade kyōiku kanji.

== Literature ==
- Fazzioli, Edoardo (1987). Chinese calligraphy : from pictograph to ideogram : the history of 214 essential Chinese/Japanese characters. calligraphy by Rebecca Hon Ko. New York: Abbeville Press. ISBN 0-89659-774-1.
