= Radical 69 =

Chinese character radical

斤
- Radical 69 (U+2F44)
- 斤 (U+65A4) "axe"

Pronunciations
- Pinyin: jīn
- Bopomofo: ㄐㄧㄣ
- Gwoyeu Romatzyh: jin
- Wade–Giles: chin^{1}
- Cantonese Yale: gān
- Jyutping: gan1
- Pe̍h-ōe-jī: kun
- Japanese Kana: キン kin (on'yomi) おの ono (kun'yomi)
- Sino-Korean: 근 geun

Names
- Chinese name(s): 斤字旁 jīnzìpáng
- Japanese name(s): 斧/おの ono 斤旁/おのづくり onodzukuri 斤/きん kin
- Hangul: 도끼 dokki

Stroke order animation

Radical 69 or radical axe (斤部) meaning "axe" is one of the 34 Kangxi radicals (214 radicals in total) composed of 4 strokes.

In the Kangxi Dictionary, there are 55 characters (out of 49,030) to be found under this radical.

斤 is also the 85th indexing component in the Table of Indexing Chinese Character Components predominantly adopted by Simplified Chinese dictionaries published in mainland China.

It is also the measure word jin or catty, a traditional Chinese unit of mass used across East and Southeast Asia, notably for weighing food and other groceries in some wet markets, street markets, and shops.

== Evolution ==
=== 斤 ===
Oracle bone script

Bronze script

Chu slip and silk script

Large seal script

Small seal script

=== 斥 ===
Originally written 㡿: semantic 广 ("building") + phonetic 屰 (OC *ŋraɡ).

Bronze script

Large seal script

Small seal script

== Derived characters ==
Strokes	Characters
+0	斤
+1	斥
+4	斦 斧 斨 斩^{SC} (=斬)
+5	斪 斫
+7	斬 断^{SC/JP} (=斷)
+8	斮 斯
+9	新 斱
+10	斲
+11	斳
+12	斴
+13	斵 (=斫) 斶
+14	斷
+21	斸

== Literature ==
- Fazzioli, Edoardo (1987). Chinese calligraphy : from pictograph to ideogram : the history of 214 essential Chinese/Japanese characters. calligraphy by Rebecca Hon Ko. New York: Abbeville Press. ISBN 0-89659-774-1.
- Lunde, Ken (Jan 5, 2009). "Appendix J: Japanese Character Sets" (PDF). CJKV Information Processing: Chinese, Japanese, Korean & Vietnamese Computing (Second ed.). Sebastopol, Calif.: O'Reilly Media. ISBN 978-0-596-51447-1.
