= Radical 28 =

Chinese character radical

厶
- Radical 28 (U+2F1B)
- 厶 (U+53B6) "private"

Pronunciations
- Pinyin: sī
- Bopomofo: ㄙ
- Wade–Giles: ssu1
- Cantonese Yale: sī
- Jyutping: mau5, si1
- Pe̍h-ōe-jī: su
- Japanese Kana: シ shi (on'yomi)
- Sino-Korean: 사 sa

Names
- Chinese name(s): 私字旁 sīzìpáng
- Japanese name(s): ム mu
- Hangul: 사사로울 sasaroul

Stroke order animation

Radical 28 or radical private (厶部), which means private is one of the 23 Kangxi radicals (214 radicals total) composed of two strokes. The radical character 厶 is the original form of 私 (private). In the Kangxi Dictionary, there are 40 characters (out of 49,030) to be found under this radical. 厶 is also the 25th indexing component in the Table of Indexing Chinese Character Components predominantly adopted by Simplified Chinese dictionaries published in mainland China.

In Japanese, this character (which resembles the katakana mu (ム)) was historically used in short forms of the verb gozaru (御座る):

Watakushi wa ima jibun no kako no owai to, watakushi no tamashii no nikuteki fuhai to o omoikoshimashō. Sore wa watakushi ga sonna mono o aisuru ga tame de wa naku, Kika o aishiyō to yū no da kara de gozaimasu. Kika ni taisuru ai no tame ni watakushi wa sō suru no de gozaimasu. (私は今自分の過去の汚穢と、私の魂の肉的腐敗とを想ひ起しませう。それは私がそんなものを愛するが爲めではなく、私の神よ、貴下を愛しようといふのだからで厶います。貴下に對する愛の爲めに私はさうするので厶います。; transl. I will now call to mind my past foulness, and the carnal corruptions of my soul: not because I love them, but that I may love Thee, O my God. For love of Thy love I do it;)

— Miyahara Kōichirō, オウガスチン懴悔錄, 第二篇

== Evolution ==
Original character for 私 ("self"). Katakana ム (mu) from 牟.

Warring States period Bronze script character

Chu slip and silk script

Large seal script character

Small seal script character

=== 去 (to leave) ===
大 ("man") + 口 ("mouth, object")

Shang dynasty Oracle bone script

Spring and Autumn period bronze script

Warring States period bronze script

Chu slip and silk script

Qin slip script

Large seal script character

Small seal script character

=== 公 (public) ===
Shang dynasty Oracle bone script

Western Zhou bronze script

Spring and Autumn period bronze script

Warring States period bronze script

Chu slip and silk script

Qin slip script

Large seal script character

Small seal script character

=== 參 (Three Stars mansion) ===
晶 ("stars") + 光 ("light; brightness") + 彡 ("light rays")

Western Zhou Bronze script

Large seal script character

Small seal script character

== Derived characters ==
Strokes	Characters
+0	厶
+2	厷 厸 厹
+3	去
+4	厽
+5	厾 县^{SC} (=縣 -> 糸) 私
+6	叀 叁^{SC} (=叄) 参^{SC/JP} (=參)
+9	參 叄
+10	叅
+11	叆^{SC} (=靉 -> 雨)
+13	叇^{SC} (=靆 -> 雨)

== See also ==
- Mu (kana) (ム)

== Literature ==
- Fazzioli, Edoardo (1987). Chinese calligraphy : from pictograph to ideogram : the history of 214 essential Chinese/Japanese characters. calligraphy by Rebecca Hon Ko. New York: Abbeville Press. ISBN 0-89659-774-1.
- Lunde, Ken (Jan 5, 2009). "Appendix J: Japanese Character Sets" (PDF). CJKV Information Processing: Chinese, Japanese, Korean & Vietnamese Computing (Second ed.). Sebastopol, Calif.: O'Reilly Media. ISBN 978-0-596-51447-1.
