= Radical 27 =

Chinese character radical

厂
- Radical 27 (U+2F1A)
- 厂 (U+5382) "cliff"

Pronunciations
- Pinyin: hǎn
- Bopomofo: ㄏㄢˇ
- Gwoyeu Romatzyh: haan
- Wade–Giles: han^{3}
- Cantonese Yale: hon
- Jyutping: hon3
- Pe̍h-ōe-jī: hàn
- Japanese Kana: カン kan (on'yomi)
- Sino-Korean: 한 han
- Hán-Việt: hán

Names
- Chinese name(s): (Simp.) 厂字头 chǎngzìtóu
- Japanese name(s): 雁垂れ/がんだれ gandare
- Hangul: 굴바위 gulbawi

Stroke order animation

Radical 27 or radical cliff (厂部) meaning "cliff" is one of the 23 Kangxi radicals (214 radicals total) composed of two strokes.

In the Kangxi Dictionary, there are 129 characters (out of 49,030) to be found under this radical.

厂 is also the 7th indexing component in the Table of Indexing Chinese Character Components predominantly adopted by Simplified Chinese dictionaries published in mainland China, with 𠂆 being its associated indexing component. Though the Chinese character 厂 shares the same form as the simplified form of 廠 (chǎng, variant: 厰) which means "factory", the two are historically irrelevant in terms of meanings.

== Evolution ==
Upper part of 石; unrelated to 广 and 疒.

Oracle bone script character

Bronze script character

Large seal script character

Small seal script character

== Derived characters ==
Strokes	Characters
+0	厂
+2	厃 厄 厅^{SC} (=廳 -> 广) 历^{SC} (=歷/曆)
+3	厇 厈 厉^{SC/JP variant} (=厲)
+4	厊 压^{SC} (=壓 -> 土) 厌^{SC} (=厭)
+5	厍^{SC} (=厙) 厎 厏 厐^{SC} (=龎=龐 -> 广) 厑
+6	厒 厓 厔 厕^{SC} (=廁 -> 广)
+7	厖 厗 厘 厙 厚 厛 (=廳 -> 广)
+8	厜 厝 厞 原
+9	厠^{JP/variant} (=廁 -> 广) 厡 (=原) 厢^{SC/variant} (=廂 -> 广) 厣^{SC} (=厴) 厩^{SC/JP/variant} (=廄 -> 广)
+10	厤 厥 厦^{SC/variant} (=廈 -> 广) 厧 厨^{SC/JP/variant} (=廚 -> 广)
+11	厪 厫
+12	厬 厭 厮 厯 (=歷) 厰 (=廠 -> 广)
+13	厱 厲
+17	厴
+28	厵

== Literature ==
- Fazzioli, Edoardo (1987). Chinese calligraphy : from pictograph to ideogram : the history of 214 essential Chinese/Japanese characters. calligraphy by Rebecca Hon Ko. New York: Abbeville Press. ISBN 0-89659-774-1.
- Lunde, Ken (Jan 5, 2009). "Appendix J: Japanese Character Sets" (PDF). CJKV Information Processing: Chinese, Japanese, Korean & Vietnamese Computing (Second ed.). Sebastopol, Calif.: O'Reilly Media. ISBN 978-0-596-51447-1.
