= Radical 186 =

Chinese character radical

香
- Radical 186 (U+2FB9)
- 香 (U+9999) "fragrant"

Pronunciations
- Pinyin: xiāng
- Bopomofo: ㄒㄧㄤ
- Wade–Giles: hsiang1
- Cantonese Yale: heung1
- Jyutping: hoeng1
- Japanese Kana: コウ kō/ キョウ kyō (on'yomi) か ka / かお-る kao-ru / かおり kaori (kun'yomi)
- Sino-Korean: 향 hyang
- Hán-Việt: hương

Names
- Japanese name(s): かおり kaori 匂い香/においコウ nioikō
- Hangul: 향기 hyanggi

Stroke order animation

Radical 186, meaning "fragrant" (香部), is one of the 11 Kangxi radicals (214 radicals in total) composed of 9 strokes.

In the Kangxi Dictionary, there are 37 characters (out of 49,030) to be found under this radical.

香 is also the 183rd indexing component in the Table of Indexing Chinese Character Components predominantly adopted by Simplified Chinese dictionaries published in mainland China.

== Evolution ==
Oracle bone script character

Bronze script character

Large seal script character

Small seal script character

== Derived characters ==
| Strokes | Characters |
|---|---|
| +0 | 香 |
| +4 | 馚 |
| +5 | 馛 馜 馝 |
| +7 | 馞 馟 馠 |
| +8 | 馡 馢 馣 |
| +9 | 馤 馥 |
| +10 | 馦 馧 |
| +11 | 馨 |
| +12 | 馩 |
| +14 | 馪 |
| +18 | 馫 (=馨) |

== Sinogram ==
As an isolated character is one of the Kyōiku kanji or Kanji taught in elementary school in Japan.

It is one of the 20 kanji added to the Kyoiku kanji that are found in the names of the following prefectures of Japan. It was added because it is a character in 香 (Kagawa).

== Literature ==
- Fazzioli, Edoardo (1987). Chinese calligraphy : from pictograph to ideogram : the history of 214 essential Chinese/Japanese characters. calligraphy by Rebecca Hon Ko. New York: Abbeville Press. ISBN 0-89659-774-1.
- Lunde, Ken (Jan 5, 2009). "Appendix J: Japanese Character Sets" (PDF). CJKV Information Processing: Chinese, Japanese, Korean & Vietnamese Computing (Second ed.). Sebastopol, Calif.: O'Reilly Media. ISBN 978-0-596-51447-1.
