= Radical 122 =

Chinese character radical

网
- Radical 122 (U+2F79)
- 网 (U+7F51) "net"

Pronunciations
- Pinyin: wǎng
- Bopomofo: ㄨㄤˇ
- Gwoyeu Romatzyh: woang
- Wade–Giles: wang^{3}
- Cantonese Yale: móhng
- Jyutping: mong5
- Japanese Kana: モウ mō / ボウ bō (on'yomi) あみ ami (kun'yomi)
- Sino-Korean: 망 mang

Names
- Chinese name(s): 网字頭/网字头 wǎngzìtóu (罒) 四字頭/四字头 sìzìtóu
- Japanese name(s): 網頭/あみがしら amigashira (罒) 四頭/よんがしら yongashira 網目/あみめ amime
- Hangul: 그물 geumul

Stroke order animation

Radical 122 or radical net (网部) meaning "net" is one of the 29 Kangxi radicals (214 radicals in total) composed of 6 strokes. Variant forms of this Kangxi radical include 罒, 罓, and ⺳.

In the Kangxi Dictionary, there are 163 characters (out of 49,030) to be found under this radical.

罒, a variant form of this radical character, is the 107th indexing component in the Table of Indexing Chinese Character Components predominantly adopted by Simplified Chinese dictionaries published in mainland China. In addition, 网 is an ancient form of 網 in modern Traditional Chinese and Japanese, and it is used as the simplified form of 網 in Simplified Chinese.

== Evolution ==
Shang dynasty Oracle bone script

Shang dynasty Bronze script

Western Zhou Bronze script

Spring and Autumn period bronze script

Warring States period bronze script

Chu slip and silk script

Qin slip script

Small seal script character

Qing dynasty Clerical script

== Derived characters ==
Strokes	Characters
+0	网^{SC} (=網) 罒 罓
+3	罔 罕 罖 (=網 -> 糸) 罗^{SC} (=羅)
+4	罘 罙 (=冞 -> 冖 / 𥥍 -> 穴) 罚^{SC} (=罰)
+5	罛 罜 罝 罞 罟 罠 罡 罢^{SC} (=罷)
+6	罣 (=掛 -> 手)
+7	罤 罥 罦
+8	罧 罨 罩 罪 罫 罬 罭 置 署
+9	罯 罰 罱 罳 罴^{SC} (=羆)
+10	罵 罶 罷 罸 (=罰)
+11	罹 罺 罻 罼
+12	罽 罾 罿 羀 羁^{SC} (=羈)
+13	羂
+14	羃 羄 羅 羆
+17	羇
+19	羈 羉

== Literature ==
- Fazzioli, Edoardo (1987). Chinese calligraphy : from pictograph to ideogram : the history of 214 essential Chinese/Japanese characters. calligraphy by Rebecca Hon Ko. New York: Abbeville Press. ISBN 0-89659-774-1.
- Lunde, Ken (Jan 5, 2009). "Appendix J: Japanese Character Sets" (PDF). CJKV Information Processing: Chinese, Japanese, Korean & Vietnamese Computing (Second ed.). Sebastopol, Calif.: O'Reilly Media. ISBN 978-0-596-51447-1.
