= Radical 116 =

Chinese character radical

穴
- Radical 116 (U+2F73)
- 穴 (U+7A74) "cave"

Pronunciations
- Pinyin: xué
- Bopomofo: ㄒㄩㄝˊ
- Wade–Giles: hsüeh2
- Cantonese Yale: yut6
- Jyutping: jyut6
- Japanese Kana: ケツ ketsu (on'yomi) あな ana (kun'yomi)
- Sino-Korean: 혈 hyeol

Names
- Chinese name(s): 穴寶蓋/穴宝盖 xuébǎogài 穴字頭/穴字头 xuézìtóu
- Japanese name(s): 穴/あな ana 穴冠/あなかんむり anakanmuri
- Hangul: 구멍 gumeong

Stroke order animation

Radical 116 or radical cave (穴部) meaning "cave" is one of the 23 Kangxi radicals (214 radicals in total) composed of 5 strokes.

In the Kangxi Dictionary, there are 298 characters (out of 49,030) to be found under this radical.

穴 is also the 117th indexing component in the Table of Indexing Chinese Character Components predominantly adopted by Simplified Chinese dictionaries published in mainland China.

== Evolution ==
Large seal script character

Small seal script character

== Derived characters ==
Strokes	Characters
+0	穴
+1	穵
+2	究 穷^{SC} (=窮)
+3	穸 穹 空 穻
+4	穼 穽 (=阱 -> 阜) 穾 穿 窀 突 窂 (=牢 -> 牛) 窃^{SC} (=竊)
+5	窄 窅 窆 窇 窈 窉 窊 窋 窌 窍^{SC} (=竅) 窎^{SC} (=窵)
+6	窏 窐 窑^{SC} (=窯) 窒 窓^{JP} (=窗) 窔 窕
+7	窖 窗 窘 窙 窚 窛 窜^{SC} (=竄) 窝^{SC} (=窩)
+8	窞 窟 窠 窡 窢 窣 窤 窥^{SC} (=窺) 窦^{SC} (=竇) 窧
+9	窨 窩 窪 窫 窬 窭^{SC} (=窶)
+10	窮 窯 窰 (=窯) 窱 窲 窳 窴
+11	窵 窶 窷 窸 窹 窺 窻 (=窗) 窼 窽
+12	窾 窿 竀 竁 竂 (=寮 -> 宀) 竃 (=灶 -> 火)
+13	竄 竅
+14	竆 (=窮)
+15	竇
+16	竈 (=灶 -> 火) 竉
+17	竊

== Variant forms ==
This radical character takes different forms in different languages. In the Kangxi Dictionary, the first stroke is a vertical dot, and the last stroke of the radical character starts with a short horizontal line when appearing independently (穴), and becomes a vertical-curve-horizontal stroke ㇄ when used as an upper component, with an exception of 空 in which the radical's last stroke starts with a short horizontal line (穴+工). In Japanese and Korean hanja, when used as an upper component, the last stroke of the radical character is a vertical-curve-hook stroke ㇟. In Traditional Chinese used in Taiwan and Hong Kong, its last stroke is a vertical-curve-horizontal stroke ㇄. In Mainland China's xin zixing, it is a rightward dot.

Traditional Chinese	Simplified Chinese	Japanese	Korean
穴 空	穴 空	穴 空	穴 空

== Sinogram ==
The radical is also used as an independent Chinese character. It is one of the kyōiku kanji or kanji taught in elementary school in Japan. It is a fifth grade kanji.

== Literature ==
- Fazzioli, Edoardo (1987). Chinese calligraphy : from pictograph to ideogram : the history of 214 essential Chinese/Japanese characters. calligraphy by Rebecca Hon Ko. New York: Abbeville Press. ISBN 0-89659-774-1.
- Lunde, Ken (Jan 5, 2009). "Appendix J: Japanese Character Sets" (PDF). CJKV Information Processing: Chinese, Japanese, Korean & Vietnamese Computing (Second ed.). Sebastopol, Calif.: O'Reilly Media. ISBN 978-0-596-51447-1.
