= Radical 164 =

Chinese character radical

酉
- Radical 164 (U+2FA3)
- 酉 (U+9149) "wine, alcohol"

Pronunciations
- Pinyin: yǒu
- Bopomofo: ㄧㄡˇ
- Wade–Giles: yu3
- Cantonese Yale: yau5
- Jyutping: jau5
- Japanese Kana: ユウ yū (on'yomi) とり tori (kun'yomi)
- Sino-Korean: 유 yu
- Hán-Việt: dậu

Names
- Chinese name(s): 酉字旁 yǒuzìpáng
- Japanese name(s): 酉偏/とりへん torihen 酒の酉/さけのとり sake no tori 日読みの酉/ひよみのとり hiyomi no tori ("hiyomi" means Earthly Branches) 暦の酉/こよみのとり koyomi no tori ("koyomi" means calendar) 酒旁/さけつくり saketsukuri
- Hangul: 닭 dak

Stroke order animation

Radical 164 or radical wine (酉部) meaning "wine" or "alcohol" is one of the 20 Kangxi radicals (214 radicals in total) composed of 7 strokes.

In the Kangxi Dictionary, 290 characters (out of 49,030) can found under this radical.

酉 is also the 153rd indexing component in the Table of Indexing Chinese Character Components predominantly adopted by Simplified Chinese dictionaries published in mainland China.

In Chinese astrology, 酉 represents the tenth Earthly Branch and corresponds to the Rooster in the Chinese zodiac.

== Evolution ==
Shang dynasty Oracle bone script

Shang dynasty Bronze script

Western Zhou Bronze script

Spring and Autumn period bronze script

Warring States period bronze script

Chu slip and silk script

Qin slip script

Shuowen ancient script

Large seal script character

Small seal script character

== Derived characters ==
Strokes	Characters
+0	酉
+2	酊 酋
+3	酌 配 酎 酏 酐 酑 酒
+4	酓 酔^{JP} (=醉) 酕 酖 酗 酘 酙 (=斟 -> 斗) 酚 酛 酜 酝^{SC} (=醞) 酞
+5	酟 酠 酡 酢 酣 酤 酥
+6	酦^{SC} (=醱) 酧 (=酬) 酨 酩 酪 酫 酬 酭 酮 酯 酰^{SC} (=醯) 酱^{SC} (=醬)
+7	酲 酳 酴 酵 酶 酷 酸 酹 酺 酻 酼 酽^{SC} (=釅) 酾^{SC} (=釃) 酿^{SC} (=釀)
+8	醀 醁 醂 醃 醄 醅 醆 醇 醈 醉 醊 醋 醌
+9	醍 醎 (=鹹 -> 鹵) 醏 醐 醑 醒 醓 醔 醕 (=醇) 醖^{HK} (=醞) 醗^{JP} (=醱)
+10	醘 醙 醚 醛 醜 醝 醞 醟 醠 醡 醢 醣 (=糖 -> 米) 醤
+11	醥 醦 醧 醨 醩 醪 醫 醬
+12	醭 醮 醯 醰 醱
+13	醲 醳 醴 醵 醶 醷 醸^{JP} (=釀)
+14	醹 醺 醻 (=酬)
+16	醼 (=宴 -> 宀)
+17	醽 醾 醿 釀
+18	釁 釂
+19	釃 釄
+20	釅

== Literature ==
- Fazzioli, Edoardo (1987). Chinese calligraphy : from pictograph to ideogram : the history of 214 essential Chinese/Japanese characters. calligraphy by Rebecca Hon Ko. New York: Abbeville Press. ISBN 0-89659-774-1.
- Lunde, Ken (Jan 5, 2009). "Appendix J: Japanese Character Sets" (PDF). CJKV Information Processing: Chinese, Japanese, Korean & Vietnamese Computing (Second ed.). Sebastopol, Calif.: O'Reilly Media. ISBN 978-0-596-51447-1.
