= Radical 187 =

Chinese radical "horse"

馬
- Radical 187 (U+2FBA)
- 馬 (U+99AC) "horse"

Pronunciations
- Pinyin: mǎ
- Bopomofo: ㄇㄚˇ
- Wade–Giles: ma3
- Cantonese Yale: ma5
- Jyutping: maa5
- Japanese Kana: バ ba / マ ma / メ me (on'yomi) うま uma (kun'yomi)
- Sino-Korean: 마 ma
- Hán-Việt: mã

Names
- Chinese name(s): (Left) 馬字旁/马字旁 mǎzìpáng (Bottom) 馬字底/马字底 mǎzìdǐ
- Japanese name(s): 馬/うま uma (Left) 馬偏/うまへん umahen
- Hangul: 말 mal

Stroke order animation

Stroke order in Hong Kong

Stroke order of the simplified form 马

Radical 187 or radical horse (馬部) meaning "horse" is one of the 8 Kangxi radicals (214 radicals in total) composed of 10 strokes.

In the Kangxi Dictionary, there are 472 characters (out of 49,030) to be found under this radical.

马, the simplified form of 馬, is the 58th indexing component in the Table of Indexing Chinese Character Components predominantly adopted by Simplified Chinese dictionaries published in mainland China, while the traditional form 馬 is listed as its associated indexing component. The simplified form 马 is derived from the cursive script form of 馬.

== Evolution ==
Shang dynasty Oracle bone script

Shang dynasty Bronze script

Western Zhou Bronze script

Spring and Autumn period bronze script

Warring States period bronze script

Chu slip and silk script

Qin slip script

Large seal script character

Small seal script character

Clerical script

== Derived characters ==
Strokes	Characters (馬)	Characters (马)
+0	馬	马^{SC} (=馬)
+2	馭 馮	驭^{SC} (=馭)
+3	馯 馰 馱 馲 馳 馴 馵	驮^{SC} (=馱) 驯^{SC} (=馴) 驰^{SC} (=馳)
+4	馶 馷 馸 馹 馺 馻 馼 馽 馾 馿 (=驢) 駀 駁 駂 駃 駄 (=馱) 駅^{JP} (=驛) 駆^{JP} (=驅) 駇 (=馼)	驱^{SC} (=驅) 驲^{SC} (=馹) 驳^{SC} (=駁) 驴^{SC} (=驢)
+5	駈 (=驅) 駉 駊 駋 駌 駍 駎 駏 駐 駑 駒 駓 駔 駕 駖 駗 駘 駙 駚 駛 駜 駝 駞 駟 駠	驵^{SC} (=駔) 驶^{SC} (=駛) 驷^{SC} (=駟) 驸^{SC} (=駙) 驹^{SC} (=駒) 驺^{SC} (=騶) 驻^{SC} (=駐) 驼^{SC} (=駝) 驽^{SC} (=駑) 驾^{SC} (=駕) 驿^{SC} (=驛) 骀^{SC} (=駘)
+6	駡 (=罵 -> 网) 駢 駣 駤 駥 駦 駧 駨 駩 駪 駫 駬 駭 駮 駯 駰 駱 駲	骁^{SC} (=驍) 骂^{SC} (=罵 -> 网) 骃^{SC} (=駰) 骄^{SC} (=驕) 骅^{SC} (=驊) 骆^{SC} (=駱) 骇^{SC} (=駭) 骈^{SC} (=駢) 骉^{SC} (=驫)
+7	駴 駵 (=騮) 駶 駷 駸 駹 駺 駻 駼 駽 駾 駿 騀 騁 騂 騃	骊^{SC} (=驪) 骋^{SC} (=騁) 验^{SC} (=驗) 骍^{SC} (=騂) 骎^{SC} (=駸) 骏^{SC} (=駿)
+8	駳 騄 騅 騆 騇 騈 (=駢) 騉 騊 騋 騌 (=騣) 騍 騎 騏 騐 (=驗) 騑 騒^{JP} (=騷) 験^{JP} (=驗)	骐^{SC} (=騏) 骑^{SC} (=騎) 骒^{SC} (=騍) 骓^{SC} (=騅) 骔 (=騌) 骕^{SC} (=驌) 骖^{SC} (=驂)
+9	騔 騕 騖 騗 (=騙) 騘 騙 騚 騛 騜 騝 騞 騟 騠 騡 騢 騣 騤 騥 騦 騧 騨^{JP} (=驒)	骗^{SC} (=騙) 骘^{SC} (=騭) 骙^{SC} (=騤) 骚^{SC} (=騷) 骛^{SC} (=騖)
+10	騩 騪 騫 騬 騭 騮 騯 騰 騱 騲 騳 騴 騵 騶 騷 騸	骜^{SC} (=驁) 骝^{SC} (=騮) 骞^{SC} (=騫) 骟^{SC} (=騸)
+11	騹 (=騏) 騺 騻 騼 騽 騾 騿 驀 驁 驂 驃 驄 驅 驆 驇 (=騺)	骠^{SC} (=驃) 骡^{SC} (=騾) 骢^{SC} (=驄)
+12	驈 驉 驊 驋 驌 驍 驎 驏 驐 驑 (=騮) 驒 驓 驔 驕	骣^{SC} (=驏)
+13	驖 驗 驘 (=騾) 驙 驚 驛 驜	
+14	驝 驞 驟	骤^{SC} (=驟)
+16	驠 驡 驢 驣	骥^{SC} (=驥)
+17	驤 驥 驦 驧	骦^{SC} (=驦) 骧^{SC} (=驤)
+18	驨 驩	
+19	驪	
+20	驫	

== Sinogram ==
The radical is also used as an independent Chinese character. It is one of the kyōiku kanji or kanji taught in elementary school in Japan. It is a second grade kanji.

== Literature ==
- Fazzioli, Edoardo (1987). Chinese calligraphy : from pictograph to ideogram : the history of 214 essential Chinese/Japanese characters. calligraphy by Rebecca Hon Ko. New York: Abbeville Press. ISBN 0-89659-774-1.
