= Radical 14 =

Chinese character radical

冖
- Radical 14 (U+2F0D)
- 冖 (U+5196) "cover"

Pronunciations
- Pinyin: mì
- Bopomofo: ㄇ一ˋ
- Wade–Giles: mi4
- Cantonese Yale: mihk
- Jyutping: mik6
- Pe̍h-ōe-jī: be̍k
- Japanese Kana: ベキ beki (on'yomi)
- Sino-Korean: 멱 myeok
- Hán-Việt: mịch

Names
- Chinese name(s): 禿寶蓋/秃宝盖 tūbǎogài
- Japanese name(s): ワ冠/ワかんむり wakanmuri 平冠/ひらかんむり hirakanmuri 冖冠/べきかんむり bekikanmuri
- Hangul: 덮을 deopeul

Stroke order animation

Radical 14 or radical cover (冖部), meaning cover, is one of 23 of the 214 Kangxi radicals that are composed of 2 strokes.

In the Kangxi Dictionary, there are 30 characters (out of 49,030) to be found under this radical.

冖 is also the 19th indexing component in the Table of Indexing Chinese Character Components predominantly adopted by Simplified Chinese dictionaries published in mainland China.

== Evolution ==
Unrelated to 宀 and top component of 写.

Oracle bone script

Bronze script

Small seal script

== Derived characters ==
Strokes	Characters
+0	冖
+2	冗 冘
+3	写^{SC}/写^{JP} (=寫 -> 宀) 冚
+4	农^{SC} (=農 -> 辰)
+5	军^{SC} (=軍 -> 車) 冝 (=宜 -> 宀)
+6	冞
+7	冟 (=適 -> 辵) 冠
+8	冡 冢 冣 冤 冥 冦 (=寇 -> 宀) 冧
+9	冨 (=富 -> 宀)
+12	冩 (=寫 -> 宀)
+14	冪

== Literature ==
- Fazzioli, Edoardo (1987). Chinese calligraphy : from pictograph to ideogram : the history of 214 essential Chinese/Japanese characters. calligraphy by Rebecca Hon Ko. New York: Abbeville Press. ISBN 0-89659-774-1.
- Leyi Li: “Tracing the Roots of Chinese Characters: 500 Cases”. Beijing 1993, ISBN 978-7-5619-0204-2
- KangXi: page 130, character 12
- Dai Kanwa Jiten: character 1565
- Dae Jaweon: page 292, character 12
- Hanyu Da Zidian: volume 1, page 302, character 14
