= Radical 68 =

Chinese character radical

斗
- Radical 68 (U+2F43)
- 斗 (U+6597) "dipper"

Pronunciations
- Pinyin: dǒu
- Bopomofo: ㄉㄡˇ
- Wade–Giles: tou3
- Cantonese Yale: dáu
- Jyutping: dau2
- Pe̍h-ōe-jī: tó͘ (lit.), táu (col.)
- Japanese Kana: ト to / トウ tō (on'yomi) ます masu (kun'yomi)
- Sino-Korean: 두 du

Names
- Chinese name(s): 斗字旁 dǒuzìpáng
- Japanese name(s): 斗/と to 斗/ます masu とます tomasu
- Hangul: 말 mal

Stroke order animation

Radical 68 or radical dipper (斗部) meaning "dipper" is one of the 34 Kangxi radicals (214 radicals in total) composed of 4 strokes.

In the Kangxi Dictionary, there are 32 characters (out of 49,030) to be found under this radical.

斗 is also the 96th indexing component in the Table of Indexing Chinese Character Components predominantly adopted by Simplified Chinese dictionaries published in mainland China.

市斗 shìdǒu, sometimes represented by 斗 dǒu alone, is also the symbol for a Chinese traditional measurement of dry volume equaling about 10 liters, which is ~18.16 pints, ~2.27 gallons, ~610.2 cubic inches, or ~0.3531 cubic feet.

== Evolution ==
Unrelated to 寸; compare ⼔.

Oracle bone script

Warring States period bronze script

Chu slip and silk script

Qin slip script

Large seal script

Small seal script

=== 斝 (jia) ===
Oracle bone script

Oracle bone script variant

Bronze script

Large seal script

Small seal script

== Derived characters ==
Strokes	Characters
+0	斗
+3	斘
+6	料 斚 (=斝) 斛
+7	斜
+8	斝
+9	斞 斟
+10	斠 斡 斢^{SC variant}
+12	斢^{TC variant}
+13	斣

== Literature ==
- Fazzioli, Edoardo (1987). Chinese calligraphy : from pictograph to ideogram : the history of 214 essential Chinese/Japanese characters. calligraphy by Rebecca Hon Ko. New York: Abbeville Press. ISBN 0-89659-774-1.
- Lunde, Ken (Jan 5, 2009). "Appendix J: Japanese Character Sets" (PDF). CJKV Information Processing: Chinese, Japanese, Korean & Vietnamese Computing (Second ed.). Sebastopol, Calif.: O'Reilly Media. ISBN 978-0-596-51447-1.
