= Radical 155 =

Chinese character radical

赤
- Radical 155 (U+2F9A)
- 赤 (U+8D64) "red, bare"

Pronunciations
- Pinyin: chì
- Bopomofo: ㄔˋ
- Wade–Giles: ch'ih4
- Cantonese Yale: chek3, chik3
- Jyutping: cek3, cik3
- Japanese Kana: セキ seki / シャク shaku (on'yomi) あか aka (kun'yomi)
- Sino-Korean: 적 jeok

Names
- Japanese name(s): 赤/あか aka 赤偏/あかへん akahen
- Hangul: 붉을 bulgeul

Stroke order animation

Radical 155 or radical red (赤部) meaning "red" or "bare" is one of the 20 Kangxi radicals (214 radicals in total) composed of 7 strokes.

In the Kangxi Dictionary, there are 31 characters (out of 49,030) to be found under this radical.

赤 is also the 151st indexing component in the Table of Indexing Chinese Character Components predominantly adopted by Simplified Chinese dictionaries published in mainland China.

== Evolution ==
Compound of 大 (“person, big”) and 火 (“fire”)

Shang dynasty Oracle bone script

Western Zhou Bronze script

Spring and Autumn period bronze script

Chu slip and silk script

Qin slip script

Shuowen ancient script

Large seal script character

Small seal script character

== Derived characters ==
Strokes	Characters
+0	赤
+4	赥 赦 赧
+6	赨 赩 赪^{SC} (=赬)
+7	赫
+9	赬 赭 赮
+10	赯

== Sinogram ==
The radical is also used as an independent Chinese character. It is one of the Kyōiku kanji or Kanji taught in elementary school in Japan. It is a first grade kanji

== Literature ==
- Fazzioli, Edoardo (1987). Chinese calligraphy : from pictograph to ideogram : the history of 214 essential Chinese/Japanese characters. calligraphy by Rebecca Hon Ko. New York: Abbeville Press. ISBN 0-89659-774-1.
