= Radical 201 =

Chinese character radical

黃
- Radical 201 (U+2FC8)
- 黃 (U+9EC3) "yellow"

Pronunciations
- Pinyin: huáng
- Bopomofo: ㄏㄨㄤˊ
- Wade–Giles: huang2
- Cantonese Yale: wong4
- Jyutping: wong4
- Japanese Kana: コウ kō / オウ ō (on'yomi) き ki (kun'yomi)
- Sino-Korean: 황 hwang
- Hán-Việt: hoàng

Names
- Japanese name(s): 黄/き ki
- Hangul: 누를 nureul

Stroke order animation

Radical 201 or radical yellow (黃部) meaning "yellow" is one of the 4 Kangxi radicals (214 radicals in total) composed of 12 strokes.

In the Kangxi Dictionary, there are 42 characters (out of 49,030) to be found under this radical.

The xin zixing form of this radical, 黄, is the 192nd indexing component in the Table of Indexing Chinese Character Components predominantly adopted by Simplified Chinese dictionaries published in mainland China.

黄 is also the Japanese simplified form (shinjitai) of this radical character.

== Evolution ==
Oracle bone script character

Bronze script character

Large seal script character

Small seal script character

== Derived characters ==
Strokes	Characters
+0	黃 黄^{SC/JP} (=黃)
+4	黅 黆
+5	黇 黈 黉^{SC} (=黌)
+6	黊 黋
+13	黌

== Variant forms ==
This radical has different forms in different languages or characters.

Kangxi Dict. Japanese hyōgai Korean Trad. Chinese (Hong Kong)	Trad. Chinese (Taiwan)	Simp. Chinese Japanese jōyō
黃	黃	黄

While Hong Kong and Taiwan have selected different forms as their standards, the two traditional forms are often interchangeable.

In Japanese, the simplified (shinjitai) form 黄 is used in jōyō kanji (e.g. 横), while the traditional form 黃 is used in hyōgai kanji (e.g. 曠).

== See also ==
- Wong (surname)

== Literature ==
- Fazzioli, Edoardo (1987). Chinese calligraphy : from pictograph to ideogram : the history of 214 essential Chinese/Japanese characters. calligraphy by Rebecca Hon Ko. New York: Abbeville Press. ISBN 0-89659-774-1.
- Lunde, Ken (Jan 5, 2009). "Appendix J: Japanese Character Sets" (PDF). CJKV Information Processing: Chinese, Japanese, Korean & Vietnamese Computing (Second ed.). Sebastopol, Calif.: O'Reilly Media. ISBN 978-0-596-51447-1.
