= Radical 33 =

Chinese character radical

士
- Radical 33 (U+2F20)
- 士 (U+58EB) "scholar, bachelor"

Pronunciations
- Pinyin: shì
- Bopomofo: ㄕˋ
- Gwoyeu Romatzyh: shyh
- Wade–Giles: shih^{4}
- Cantonese Yale: sih
- Jyutping: si6
- Pe̍h-ōe-jī: sū
- Japanese Kana: シ shi (on'yomi) さむらい samurai (kun'yomi)
- Sino-Korean: 사 sa

Names
- Chinese name(s): (Top) 士字頭/士字头 shìzìtóu (Side) 士字旁 shìzìpáng
- Hangul: 선비 seonbi

Stroke order animation

Radical 33 or radical scholar (士部) meaning "scholar" or "bachelor" is one of the 31 Kangxi radicals (214 radicals total) composed of three strokes.

In the Kangxi Dictionary, there are 24 characters (out of 49,030) to be found under this radical.

In mainland China, this radical is merged to radical earth (土, principal indexing component #29 in the Table of Indexing Chinese Character Components) as its associated indexing component.

== Evolution ==
=== 士 ===
A war axe similar to 王; unrelated to 土 but related to 圭.

Oracle bone script character

Bronze script character

Chu slip and silk script

Qin slip script

Large seal script character

Small seal script character

=== 壬 (9th heavenly stem) ===
Oracle bone script character

Bronze script character

Chu slip and silk script

Large seal script character

Small seal script character

== Derived characters ==
Strokes	Characters
+0	士
+1	壬
+2	壭 (KO)
+3	壮^{SC/JP} (=壯)
+4	壯 声^{SC/JP} (=聲 -> 耳) 壱^{JP} (=壹) 売^{JP} (=賣 -> 貝)
+5	壳^{SC} (=殼 -> 殳)
+6	壴 壵
+7	壶^{SC} (=壺)
+8	壷^{JP} (=壺) 壸^{SC} (=壼)
+9	壹 壺 壻
+10	壼
+11	壽
+12	壾 壿 夀 (=壽)
+13	夁

== Sinogram ==
The radical is also used as an independent Chinese character. It is one of the Kyōiku kanji or Kanji taught in elementary school in Japan. It is a fourth grade kanji.

== Literature ==
- Fazzioli, Edoardo (1987). Chinese calligraphy : from pictograph to ideogram : the history of 214 essential Chinese/Japanese characters. calligraphy by Rebecca Hon Ko. New York: Abbeville Press. ISBN 0-89659-774-1.
- Lunde, Ken (Jan 5, 2009). "Appendix J: Japanese Character Sets" (PDF). CJKV Information Processing: Chinese, Japanese, Korean & Vietnamese Computing (Second ed.). Sebastopol, Calif.: O'Reilly Media. ISBN 978-0-596-51447-1.
