= Radical 102 =

Chinese character radical

田
- Radical 102 (U+2F65)
- 田 (U+7530) "rice paddy"

Pronunciations
- Pinyin: tián
- Bopomofo: ㄊㄧㄢˊ
- Gwoyeu Romatzyh: tyan
- Wade–Giles: tʻien^{2}
- Cantonese Yale: tìhn
- Jyutping: tin4
- Japanese Kana: デン den (on'yomi) た ta (kun'yomi)
- Sino-Korean: 전 jeon

Names
- Chinese name(s): 田字旁 tiánzìpáng
- Japanese name(s): 田/た ta (Left) 田偏/たへん tahen
- Hangul: 밭 bat

Stroke order animation

Stroke order
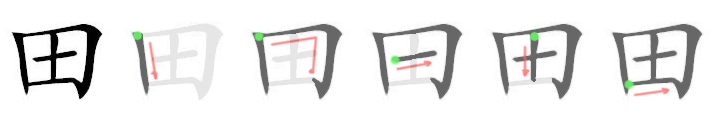

Japanese stroke order
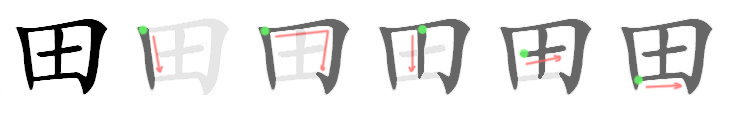

Radical 102 or radical field (田部) meaning "field" is number 102 out of 214 Kangxi radicals. It is one of the 23 radicals composed of 5 strokes. With 192 signs derived from this character in the Kangxi Dictionary, it has a frequency somewhat below average.

田 is also the 106th indexing component in the Table of Indexing Chinese Character Components predominantly adopted by Simplified Chinese dictionaries published in mainland China.

The character 田 is a pictograph of a rice field with irrigation channels. There are several variants of the radical, which may also have other meanings. Signs derived from this character mostly belong to the agricultural sphere, such as 亩, a unit of area, 男, a field worker, or 畜 "cattle".

== Evolution ==
田 is a component of 里 and 鬼. 田 is unrelated to 由 ("cause"), 甲 ("turtle shell", "first"), 思 ("think"), 黃 ("yellow") and 果 ("fruit").

Shang dynasty Oracle bone script

Shang dynasty Bronze script

Western Zhou Bronze script

Chu slip and silk script

Qin slip script

Large seal script character

Small seal script character

=== 由 ===
Western Zhou Bronze script

=== 甲 ===
Shang dynasty Oracle bone script

Shang dynasty Oracle bone script variant

Western Zhou Bronze script

Chu slip and silk script

Qin slip script

Large seal script character

Small seal script character

=== 果 ===
Fruits on a tree (木).

Shang dynasty Oracle bone script

Western Zhou Bronze script

Large seal script character

Small seal script character

=== 思 ===
Original form was 恖 from 囟 ("fontanelle") + semantic 心 ("heart").

Large seal script character

Small seal script character

== Derived characters ==
Strokes	Characters
+ 0	田 由 甲 申 甴 电
+ 1	甶
+ 2	男 甸 甹 町 甼
+ 3	画 甽 甾 甿 畀 畁 畂 畃 畄 畅
+ 4	畆 畇 畈 畉 畊 畋 界 畍 畎 畏 畐 畑 畒 畓
+ 5	畔 畕 畖 畗 畘 留 畚 畛 畜 畝 畞 畟 畠
+ 6	畡 畢 畣 畤 略 畦 畧 畨 畩 異
+ 7	番 畫 畬 畭 畮 畯 畱 畲 畳 畴
+ 8	畵 當 畷 畸 畹 畺
+ 9	畻 畼 畽
+10	畾 畿
+11	疀 疁 疂
+12	疃 疄
+13	疅
+14	疆 疇
+15	疈
+17	疉 疊

In Chinese astrology, 申 represents the ninth Earthly Branch and corresponds to the Monkey in the Chinese zodiac. In other signs such as 钿 "coin", the radical has merely phonetic significance. In other cases, it is present due to assimilation of a similar but originally distinct radical, as in 胃 "stomach". In the ancient Chinese cyclic character numeral system tiāngān, 甲 represents the first Celestial stem.

== Sinogram ==
The radical is also used as an independent Chinese character. It is one of the kyōiku kanji or kanji taught in elementary school in Japan. It is a first grade kanji.

== Literature ==
- Fazzioli, Edoardo (1987). Chinese calligraphy : from pictograph to ideogram : the history of 214 essential Chinese/Japanese characters. calligraphy by Rebecca Hon Ko. New York: Abbeville Press. ISBN 0-89659-774-1.
- Leyi Li: "Tracing the Roots of Chinese Characters: 500 Cases". Beijing 1993, ISBN 978-7-5619-0204-2
- Rick Harbaugh, Chinese Characters: A Genealogy and Dictionary, Yale University Press (1998), ISBN 978-0-9660750-0-7.
