= Radical 32 =

Kangxi radical meaning 'earth'

土
- Radical 32 (U+2F1F)
- 土 (U+571F) "earth"

Pronunciations
- Pinyin: tǔ
- Bopomofo: ㄊㄨˇ
- Gwoyeu Romatzyh: tuu
- Wade–Giles: tʻu^{3}
- Cantonese Yale: tóu
- Jyutping: tou2
- Pe̍h-ōe-jī: thó͘
- Japanese Kana: ド do / ト to (on'yomi) つち tsuchi (kun'yomi)
- Sino-Korean: 토 to

Names
- Chinese name(s): (Left) 提土旁 títǔpáng (Left) 土字旁 tǔzìpáng (Bottom) 土字底 tǔzìdǐ
- Japanese name(s): (Left) 土偏/つちへん/どへん tsuchihen/dohen
- Hangul: 흙 heuk

Stroke order animation

Radical 32 or radical earth (土部) meaning "earth" is one of the 31 Kangxi radicals (214 radicals total) composed of three strokes.

In the Kangxi Dictionary, there are 580 characters (out of 49,030) to be found under this radical.

土 is also the 29th indexing component in the Table of Indexing Chinese Character Components predominantly adopted by Simplified Chinese dictionaries published in mainland China. Kangxi radical 33 (士 "scholar") is merged to this radical as an associated indexing component of the principal indexing component 土 in mainland China.

In the Chinese wuxing ("Five Phases"), 土 represents the element earth.

== Evolution ==
Unrelated to 士, 圭 and top part of 去, 走 and 赤.

Shang dynasty Oracle bone script

Western Zhou Bronze script

Spring and Autumn period bronze script

Chu slip and silk script

Qin slip script

Large seal script character

Small seal script character

== Derived characters ==
Strokes	Characters
+0	土
+1	圠 圡
+2	圢 圣 (also SC of 聖 -> Radical 128) 圤 圥 圦 圧^{JP} (=壓) 㘦
+3	在 圩 圪 圫 圬 圭 圮 圯 地 圱 圲 圳 圴 圵 圶 圷 圸 圹^{SC} (=壙) 场^{SC} (=場)
+4	圻 圼 圽 圾 圿 址 坁 坂 坃 坄 坅 坆 均 坈 坉 坊 坋 坌 坍 坎 坏^{SC} (=壞; also variant of 坯) 坐 坑 坒 坓 坔 坕 坖 块^{SC} (=塊) 坘 坙 坚^{SC} (=堅) 坛 坜^{SC} (=壢) 坝^{SC} (=垻/壩) 坞^{SC} (=塢) 坟^{SC} (=墳) 坠^{SC} (=墜) 㘧 㘨 㘩 㘪 㘫 㘬 㘭 㘮^{JP nonstandard} (=墿) 㘯 (=場) 㘰
+5	坡 坢 坣 坤 坥 坦 坧 坨 坩 坪 坫 坬 坭 坮 坯 坰 坱 坲 坳 坴 坵 坶 坷 坸 坹 坺 坻 坼 坽 坾 坿 垀 垁 垂 垃 垄^{SC} (=壟) 垅^{SC} (=壠) 垆^{SC} (=壚) 垇 垈 垉 垊 㘱 㘲 㘳 㘴 (=坐) 㘵
+6	型 垌 垍 垎 垏 垐 垑 垒^{SC} (=壘) 垓 垔 垕 垖 垗 垘 垙 垚 垛 垜 (=垛) 垝 垞 垟 垠 垡 垢 垣 垤 垥 垦 垧 垨 垩^{SC} (=堊) 垪 垫^{SC} (=墊) 垬 垭^{SC} (=埡) 垮 垯^{SC} (=墶) 垰 (JP) 垱^{SC} (=壋) 垲^{SC} (=塏) 垳 垴^{SC/variant} (=堖) 垵 城 㘶 㘷 㘸 㘹 㘺 㘻 㘼 㘽 㘾 埩^{SC variant}
+7	垶 垷 垸 垹 垺 垻 垼 垽 垾 垿 埀 埁 埂 埃 埄 埅 埆 埇 埈 埉 埊 埋 埌 埍 埏 埐 埑 埒 埓 (=埒) 埔 埕 埖 埗 埘^{SC} (=塒) 埙^{SC} (=塤) 埚^{SC} (=堝) 埛 﨏 㘿 㙀 㙁 㙂 㙃 㙄 㙅 㙆
+8	埜 (=野 -> 里) 埝 埞 域 埠 埡 埢 埣 埤 埥 埦 埧 埨 埩^{TC variant} 埫 埬 埭 埮 埯 埰 埱 埲 埳 埴 埵 埶 執 埸 培 基 埻 埼 埽 埾 埿 堀 堁 堂 堃 堄 堅 堆 堇 堈 堉 堊 堋 堌 堍 堎 堏 堐 堑^{SC} (=塹) 堒 堓 堔 堕^{SC/JP} (=墮) 堵 㙇 㙈 㙉 㙊 㙋 㙌^{SC} (TC form unavailable) 㙍
+9	埪 堖 堗 堘 堙 堚 堛 堜 堝 堞 堟 堠 堡 堢 堣 堤 堥 堦 堧 堨 堩 堪 堫 堬 堭 堮 堯 堰 報 堲 堳 場 堶 堷 堸 堹 堺 堻 堼 堾 堿 塀 塁^{JP} (=壘) 塂 塄 塅 塆^{SC} (=壪) 塇 塈 㙎 㙏 㙐 㙑 㙒 㙓 㙔 㙕 㙖 㙗 㙘 塊^{SC variant} 塭^{SC variant}
+10	堽 塃 塉 塊^{TC variant} 塋 塌 塍 塎 塏 塐 塑 塒 塓 塔 塕 塖 塗 塘 塙 塚 塛 塜 塝 塞 塟 塠 塡^{Kangxi/JP standard/KO} (=填) 塢 塣 塤 塥 塦 塧 塨 塩^{JP} (=鹽) 塪 填 塬 塭^{TC variant} 塮 塯 塰 塱 塞 塚 㙙 㙚 㙛 㙜 㙝 㙞 㙟
+11	塲 (=場) 塳 塴 塵 塶 塷 塸 塹 塺 塻 塼 塽 塾 塿 墀 墁 墂 境 墄 墅 墆 墇 墈 墉 墊 墋 墌 墍^{Kangxi/JP/KO} (=塈) 墎 墏 墐 墑 墒 墓 墔 墕 墖 増^{JP} (=增) 墘 墙^{SC} (=牆 -> 爿) 墚 墛 㙠 㙡 㙢 㙣 㙤 㙥 㙦 墴^{SC variant}
+12	墜 墝 增 墟 墠 墡 墢 墣 墤 墥 墦 墧 墨 墩 墪 墫 墬 墭 墮 墯 墰 墱 墲 墳 墴^{TC variant} 墵 墶 墷 墸 墹 㙧 㙨 㙩 㙪 㙫 㙬 㙭 㙮 㙯
+13	墺 墻 (=牆 -> 爿) 墼 墽 墾 墿 壀 壁 壂 壃 壄 壅 壆 壇 壈 壉 壊^{JP} (=壞) 壋 壌^{JP} (=壤) 㙰 㙱 㙲 㙳 㙴 㙵 㙶
+14	壍 壎 壏 壐 壑 壒 壓 壔 壕 壖 壗 㙷 㙸 㙹 㙺
+15	壘 壙 㙻 㙼 㙽
+16	壚 壛 壜 壝 壞 壟 壠 壢 㙾 㙿
+17	壣 壤 壥 㚀
+18	壦
+20	壧 壨
+21	壩 㚁
+22	壪 㚂

== Sinogram ==
As an independent character it is one of the Kyōiku kanji or Kanji taught in elementary school in Japan. It is a first grade kanji.

== Literature ==
- Fazzioli, Edoardo (1987). Chinese calligraphy : from pictograph to ideogram : the history of 214 essential Chinese/Japanese characters. calligraphy by Rebecca Hon Ko. New York: Abbeville Press. ISBN 0-89659-774-1.
- Lunde, Ken (Jan 5, 2009). "Appendix J: Japanese Character Sets" (PDF). CJKV Information Processing: Chinese, Japanese, Korean & Vietnamese Computing (Second ed.). Sebastopol, Calif.: O'Reilly Media. ISBN 978-0-596-51447-1.
