= Radical 195 =

Chinese character radical

魚
- Radical 195 (U+2FC2)
- 魚 (U+9B5A) "fish"

Pronunciations
- Pinyin: yú
- Bopomofo: ㄩˊ
- Wade–Giles: yü2
- Cantonese Yale: yu4
- Jyutping: jyu4
- Japanese Kana: ギョ gyo / ゴ go (on'yomi) うお uo / さかな sakana (kun'yomi)
- Sino-Korean: 어 eo
- Hán-Việt: ngư

Names
- Chinese name(s): (Left) 魚字旁/鱼字旁 yúzìpáng
- Japanese name(s): (Left) 魚偏/うおへん uohen
- Hangul: 물고기 mulgogi

Stroke order animation

Stroke order of the simpflied form

Radical 195 or radical fish (魚部) meaning "fish" is one of the 6 Kangxi radicals (214 radicals in total) composed of 11 strokes.

In the Kangxi Dictionary, there are 571 characters (out of 49,030) to be found under this radical.

鱼 (8 strokes), the simplified form of 魚, is the 177th indexing component in the Table of Indexing Chinese Character Components predominantly adopted by Simplified Chinese dictionaries published in mainland China, while the traditional form 魚 is listed as its associated indexing component.

== Evolution ==
Oracle bone script character

Bronze script character

Large seal script character

Small seal script character

== Derived characters ==
Strokes	Characters (魚)	Characters (鱼)
+0	魚	鱼^{SC} (=魚)
+2	魛 魜 魝 魞	鱽^{SC} (=魛)
+3	魟 魠 魡 魢	鱾^{SC} (=魢)
+4	魣 魤 魥 魦 魧 魨 魩 魪 魫 魬 魭 魮 魯 魰 魱 魲 (=鱸) 魳 魴 魵 魶 魷 魸 魹 䰾	鱿^{SC} (=魷) 鲀^{SC} (=魨) 鲁^{SC} (=魯) 鲂^{SC} (=魴) 鲃^{SC} (=䰾)
+5	魺 魻 魼 魽 魾 魿 鮀 鮁 鮂 鮃 鮄 鮅 鮆 鮇 鮈 鮉 鮊 鮋 鮌 鮍 鮎 鮏 鮐 鮑 鮒 鮓 鮔 鮕 鮖 鮗 鮘 鮣 穌	鲄^{SC} (=魺) 鲅^{SC} (=鮁) 鲆^{SC} (=鮃) 鲇^{SC} (=鮎) 鲈^{SC} (=鱸) 鲉^{SC} (=鮋) 鲊^{SC} (=鮓) 鲋^{SC} (=鮒) 鲌^{SC} (=鮊) 鲍^{SC} (=鮑) 鲎^{SC} (=鱟) 鲏^{SC} (=鮍) 鲐^{SC} (=鮐)
+6	鮙 (=鰨) 鮚 鮛 鮜 鮝 (=鯗) 鮞 鮟 鮠 鮡 鮢 鮤 鮥 鮦 鮧 鮨 鮩 鮪 鮫 鮬 鮭 鮮 鮯 鮰 鮱 鮲 鮳 鮴 鮺	鲑^{SC} (=鮭) 鲒^{SC} (=鮚) 鲓 (=鮳) 鲔^{SC} (=鮪) 鲕^{SC} (=鮞) 鲖^{SC} (=鮦) 鲗^{SC} (=鰂) 鲘^{SC} (=鮜) 鲙^{SC} (=鱠) 鲚^{SC} (=鱭) 鲛^{SC} (=鮫) 鲜^{SC} (=鮮) 鲝^{SC} (=鮺) 鲞^{SC} (=鯗) 鲟^{SC} (=鱘)
+7	鮵 鮶 鮷 (=鯷) 鮸 鮹 鮻 鮼 鮽 鮾 鮿 鯀 鯁 鯂 (=穌 -> 禾) 鯃 鯄 鯅 鯆 鯇 鯈 鯉 鯊 鯋 鯌 鯍 鯎 鯏 鯐 鯑 鯒 鯓 鯽	鲠^{SC} (=鯁) 鲡^{SC} (=鱺) 鲢^{SC} (=鰱) 鲣^{SC} (=鰹) 鲤^{SC} (=鯉) 鲥^{SC} (=鰣) 鲦^{SC} (=鰷) 鲧^{SC} (=鯀) 鲨^{SC} (=鯊) 鲩^{SC} (=鯇) 鲪^{SC} (=鮶) 鲫^{SC} (=鯽) 鲬^{SC} (=鯒)
+8	鯔 鯕 鯖 鯗 鯘 (=鮾) 鯙 鯚 鯛 鯜 鯝 鯞 鯟 鯠 鯡 鯢 鯣 鯤 鯥 鯦 鯧 鯨 鯩 鯪 鯫 鯬 鯭 鯮 鯯 鯰 鯱 鯲 鯳 鯴 鯵 鯻	鲭^{SC} (=鯖) 鲮^{SC} (=鯪) 鲯^{SC} (=鯕) 鲰^{SC} (=鯫) 鲱^{SC} (=鯡) 鲲^{SC} (=鯤) 鲳^{SC} (=鯧) 鲴^{SC} (=鯝) 鲵^{SC} (=鯢) 鲶^{SC} (=鯰) 鲷^{SC} (=鯛) 鲸^{SC} (=鯨) 鲹^{SC} (=鰺) 鲺^{SC} (=鯴) 鲻^{SC} (=鯔)
+9	鯶 鯷 鯸 鯹 (=鮏) 鯺 鯼 鯾 鯿 鰀 (=鯇) 鰁 鰂 鰃 鰄 鰅 鰆 鰇 鰈 鰉 鰊 鰋 鰌 鰍 鰎 鰏 鰐 (=鱷) 鰑 鰒 鰓 鰔 鰕 鰖 鰗 鰘 鰙 鰚 鰛 鰠	鲼^{SC} (=鱝) 鲽^{SC} (=鰈) 鲿^{SC} (=鱨) 鳀^{SC} (=鯷) 鳁^{SC} (=鰛) 鳂^{SC} (=鰃) 鳃^{SC} (=鰓) 鳄^{SC} (=鱷) 鳅^{SC} (=鰍) 鳆^{SC} (=鰒) 鳇^{SC} (=鰉) 鳈^{SC} (=鰁) 鳉^{SC} (=鱂) 鳊^{SC} (=鯿) 鳋 (=鰠)
+10	鰜 鰝 鰞 鰟 鰡 鰢 鰣 鰤 鰥 鰦 鰧 鰨 鰩 鰪 鰫 鰬 鰭 鰮 鰯 鰰	鲾^{SC} (=鰏) 鳌^{SC} (=鰲) 鳍^{SC} (=鰭) 鳎^{SC} (=鰨) 鳏^{SC} (=鰥) 鳐^{SC} (=鰩) 鳑^{SC} (=鰟) 鳒^{SC} (=鰜)
+11	鰱 鰲 鰳 鰴 鰵 鰶 鰷 鰸 鰹 鰺 鰻 鰼 鰽 鰾 鰿 鱀 鱁 鱂 鱃 鱄 鱅 鱆 鱇 鱈 鷠 䲁	鳓^{SC} (=鰳) 鳔^{SC} (=鰾) 鳕^{SC} (=鱈) 鳖^{SC} (=鱉) 鳗^{SC} (=鰻) 鳘^{SC} (=鰵) 鳙^{SC} (=鱅) 鳚^{SC} (=䲁) 鳛^{SC} (=鰼)
+12	鱉 鱊 鱋 鱌 鱍 鱎 鱏 鱐 鱑 鱒 鱓 (=鱔) 鱔 鱕 鱖 鱗 鱘 鱙 鱚 鱛	鳜^{SC} (=鱖) 鳝^{SC} (=鱔) 鳞^{SC} (=鱗) 鳟^{SC} (=鱒)
+13	鱜 鱝 鱞 鱟 鱠 鱡 鱢 鱣 鱤 鱥 鱦 鱧 鱩 鱪 鱫	鳠^{SC} (=鱯) 鳡^{SC} (=鱤) 鳢^{SC} (=鱧) 鳣^{SC} (=鱣)
+14	鱨 鱬 鱭 鱮 鱯 鱰 䲘	鳤^{SC} (=䲘)
+15	鱱 鱲 鱳 鱴 鱵 鱶 (=鯗)	
+16	鱷 鱸	
+18	鱹	
+19	鱺	
+22	鱻 (=鮮)	
+33	䲜	

== Sinogram ==
The radical is also used as an independent Chinese character. It is one of the Kyōiku kanji or Kanji taught in elementary school in Japan. It is a second grade kanji.

== Literature ==
- Fazzioli, Edoardo (1987). Chinese calligraphy : from pictograph to ideogram : the history of 214 essential Chinese/Japanese characters. calligraphy by Rebecca Hon Ko. New York: Abbeville Press. ISBN 0-89659-774-1.
