= Radical 45 =

Chinese character radical

屮
- Radical 45 (U+2F2C)
- 屮 (U+5C6E) "sprout"

Pronunciations
- Pinyin: chè
- Bopomofo: ㄔㄜˋ
- Wade–Giles: ch'e4
- Cantonese Yale: chit
- Jyutping: cit3
- Pe̍h-ōe-jī: tia̍t
- Japanese Kana: テツ tetsu (on'yomi) ひだり hidari (kun'yomi)
- Sino-Korean: 철 cheol

Names
- Japanese name(s): 屮/てつ tetsu 芽生え/めばえ mebae
- Hangul: 풀, 싹날 pul, ssak nal

Stroke order animation

Radical 45 or radical sprout (屮部) is one of the 31 Kangxi radicals (214 radicals total) composed of three strokes.

In the Kangxi Dictionary, there are 38 characters (out of 49,030) to be found under this radical.

屮 is also the 55th indexing component in the Table of Indexing Chinese Character Components predominantly adopted by Simplified Chinese dictionaries published in mainland China.

== Evolution ==
=== 屮 ===
Component of 艸. Compare 木.

Bronze script character

Chu slip and silk script

Large seal script character

Small seal script character

=== 屯 ===
Oracle bone script

Bronze script character

Chu slip and silk script

Large seal script character

Small seal script character

=== 屰 ===
Upside-down person (大).

Oracle bone script

Bronze script character

Small seal script character

== Derived characters ==
Strokes	Characters
+0	屮
+1	屯
+3	屰

== Literature ==
- Fazzioli, Edoardo (1987). Chinese calligraphy : from pictograph to ideogram : the history of 214 essential Chinese/Japanese characters. calligraphy by Rebecca Hon Ko. New York: Abbeville Press. ISBN 0-89659-774-1.
- Lunde, Ken (Jan 5, 2009). "Appendix J: Japanese Character Sets" (PDF). CJKV Information Processing: Chinese, Japanese, Korean & Vietnamese Computing (Second ed.). Sebastopol, Calif.: O'Reilly Media. ISBN 978-0-596-51447-1.
