= Radical 21 =

Chinese character radical

匕
- Radical 21 (U+2F14)
- 匕 (U+5315) "spoon"

Pronunciations
- Pinyin: bǐ
- Bopomofo: ㄅㄧˇ
- Gwoyeu Romatzyh: bii
- Wade–Giles: pi^{3}
- Cantonese Yale: bei6
- Jyutping: bei2 bei6
- Pe̍h-ōe-jī: pí
- Japanese Kana: ヒ hi (on'yomi) さじ saji (kun'yomi)
- Sino-Korean: 비 bi
- Hán-Việt: chủy

Names
- Japanese name(s): 匕のヒ/さじのひ sajinohi
- Hangul: 비수 bisu

Stroke order animation

Radical 21 or radical spoon (匕部) meaning "spoon" is one of the 23 Kangxi radicals (214 radicals total) composed of two strokes.

In the Kangxi Dictionary, there are 19 characters (out of 49,030) to be found under this radical.

匕 is also the 15th indexing component in the Table of Indexing Chinese Character Components predominantly adopted by Simplified Chinese dictionaries published in mainland China.

== Evolution ==
=== 匕 ===
Component of 比, source of kana ひ and ヒ (both "hi"). Sometimes represent person, compare 人 and 尸.

Shang dynasty Oracle bone script

Western Zhou bronze script

Chu slip and silk script

Large seal script character

Small seal script character

=== 化 ===
Shang dynasty Oracle bone script

Western Zhou bronze script

Chu slip and silk script

Large seal script character

Small seal script character

=== 北 ===
Shang dynasty Oracle bone script

Western Zhou bronze script

Chu slip and silk script

Qin slip script

Large seal script character

Small seal script character

== Derived characters ==
Strokes	Characters
+0	匕^{Kangxi/SC/HK/JP/KO}/匕^{TW}
+2	化^{Kangxi/SC}/化^{JP/KO/HK}/化^{TW}
+3	北
+9	匘 匙

== Variant forms ==
匕 as a component of Chinese characters takes different forms in different printing typefaces or different Chinese characters. In the Kangxi Dictionary, current standard Simplified Chinese, Hong Kong Traditional Chinese, and Japanese, the second stroke of 匕 is a left-falling stroke. In Taiwan Traditional Chinese, the Standard Form of National Characters prescribes the second stroke of 匕 is horizontal, 匕 with a left-falling second stroke is also widely used.

The nuance of this character applies to both printing and handwriting forms.

2nd stroke left-falling		2nd stroke horizontal
匕		匕
化	化	化
Kangxi Dict. Simp. Chinese	Hong Kong Macau Japanese Korean	Taiwan

== Literature ==
- Fazzioli, Edoardo (1987). Chinese calligraphy : from pictograph to ideogram : the history of 214 essential Chinese/Japanese characters. calligraphy by Rebecca Hon Ko. New York: Abbeville Press. ISBN 0-89659-774-1.
- Lunde, Ken (Jan 5, 2009). "Appendix J: Japanese Character Sets" (PDF). CJKV Information Processing: Chinese, Japanese, Korean & Vietnamese Computing (Second ed.). Sebastopol, Calif.: O'Reilly Media. ISBN 978-0-596-51447-1.
