= Radical 100 =

Chinese character radical

生
- Radical 100 (U+2F63)
- 生 (U+751F) "life"

Pronunciations
- Pinyin: shēng
- Bopomofo: ㄕㄥ
- Gwoyeu Romatzyh: sheng
- Wade–Giles: shêng^{1}
- Cantonese Yale: sāang
- Jyutping: saang1
- Japanese Kana: セイ sei / ショウ shō (on'yomi) い-きる i-kiru / う-まれる u-mareru (kun'yomi)
- Sino-Korean: 생 saeng

Names
- Japanese name(s): いきる ikiru うまれる umareru せい sei しょう shō
- Hangul: 날 nal

Stroke order animation

Radical 100 or radical life (生部) meaning "life" is one of the 23 Kangxi radicals (214 radicals in total) composed of 5 strokes.

In the Kangxi Dictionary, there are 22 characters (out of 49,030) to be found under this radical.

生 is also the 109th indexing component in the Table of Indexing Chinese Character Components predominantly adopted by Simplified Chinese dictionaries published in mainland China.

== Evolution ==
屮 (“bud”) + 一 (“ground”); unrelated to 主

Oracle bone script character

Bronze script character

Large seal script character

Small seal script character

== Derived characters ==
| Strokes | Characters |
|---|---|
| +0 | 生 |
| +4 | 甠 |
| +5 | 甡 |
| +6 | 產 産 |
| +7 | 甤 甥 甦 |
| +9 | 甧 |

== Sinogram ==
The radical is also used as an independent Chinese character. It is one of the kyōiku kanji or kanji taught in elementary school in Japan. It is a first grade kanji.

The character alone is present in the phrase worship of the living.

== Literature ==
- Fazzioli, Edoardo (1987). Chinese calligraphy : from pictograph to ideogram : the history of 214 essential Chinese/Japanese characters. calligraphy by Rebecca Hon Ko. New York: Abbeville Press. ISBN 0-89659-774-1.
- Lunde, Ken (Jan 5, 2009). "Appendix J: Japanese Character Sets" (PDF). CJKV Information Processing: Chinese, Japanese, Korean & Vietnamese Computing (Second ed.). Sebastopol, Calif.: O'Reilly Media. ISBN 978-0-596-51447-1.
