= Radical 40 =

Chinese character radical

宀
- Radical 40 (U+2F27)
- 宀 (U+5B80) "roof"

Pronunciations
- Pinyin: mián
- Bopomofo: ㄇㄧㄢˊ
- Gwoyeu Romatzyh: mian
- Wade–Giles: mien^{2}
- Cantonese Yale: mìhn
- Jyutping: min4
- Pe̍h-ōe-jī: biân
- Japanese Kana: ベン ben (on'yomi)
- Sino-Korean: 면 myeon

Names
- Chinese name(s): 寶蓋頭/宝盖头 bǎogàitóu
- Japanese name(s): ウ冠/ウかんむり ukanmuri
- Hangul: 집 jip 갓머리 ganmeori

Stroke order animation

Radical 40 or radical roof (宀部) meaning "roof" is one of the 31 Kangxi radicals (214 radicals total) composed of three strokes.

In the Kangxi Dictionary, there are 246 characters (out of 49,030) to be found under this radical.

宀 is also the 48th indexing component in the Table of Indexing Chinese Character Components predominantly adopted by Simplified Chinese dictionaries published in mainland China.

== Evolution ==
Similar to 广; unrelated 亠 and 冖.

Oracle bone script character

Bronze script character

Large seal script character

Small seal script character

== Derived characters ==
Strokes	Characters
+0	宀
+2	宁 (als SC form of 寧) 宂 (=冗 -> 冖) 它 宄
+3	宅 宆 (=穹 -> 穴) 宇 守 安
+4	宊 宋 完 宍 (=肉 -> 肉) 宎 宏 宐 宑 宒
+5	宓 宔 宕 宖 宗 官 宙 定 宛 宜 宝^{SC/JP} (=寶) 实^{SC} (=實) 実^{JP} (=實) 宠^{SC} (=寵) 审^{SC} (=審)
+6	客 宣 室 宥 宦 宨 宩 宪^{SC} (=憲 -> 心) 宫^{SC} (=宮)
+7	宧 宬 宭 宮 宯 宰 宱 宲 害 宴 宵 家 宷 宸 容 宺 宻 (=密) 宼 (=寇) 宽 （SC, =寬) 宾^{SC} (=賓)
+8	宿 寀 寁 寂 寃 (=冤 -> 冖) 寄 寅 密 寇 寈
+9	寊 寋 富 寍 寎 寏 寐 寑 寒 寓 寔 寕 (=寧)
+10	寖 寗 (=甯) 寘 (=置 -> 网) 寙 寚 寛^{JP} (=寬) 寜 (=寧) 寝^{SC/JP} (=寢)
+11	寞 察 寠 寡 寢 寣 寤 寥 實 寧 寨
+12	審 寪 寫 寬 寭 寮
+13	寯 寰
+14	寱 寲
+16	寳 (=寶) 寴 寵
+17	寶
+18	寷

== Literature ==
- Fazzioli, Edoardo (1987). Chinese calligraphy : from pictograph to ideogram : the history of 214 essential Chinese/Japanese characters. calligraphy by Rebecca Hon Ko. New York: Abbeville Press. ISBN 0-89659-774-1.
- Lunde, Ken (Jan 5, 2009). "Appendix J: Japanese Character Sets" (PDF). CJKV Information Processing: Chinese, Japanese, Korean & Vietnamese Computing (Second ed.). Sebastopol, Calif.: O'Reilly Media. ISBN 978-0-596-51447-1.
