= Radical 94 =

Chinese character radical "dog"

犬
- Radical 94 (U+2F5D)
- 犬 (U+72AC) "dog"

Pronunciations
- Pinyin: quǎn
- Bopomofo: ㄑㄩㄢˇ
- Wade–Giles: ch'üan3
- Cantonese Yale: hyún
- Jyutping: hyun2
- Pe̍h-ōe-jī: khián
- Japanese Kana: ケン ken (on'yomi) いぬ inu (kun'yomi)
- Sino-Korean: 견 gyeon

Names
- Chinese name(s): (犭) 反犬旁 fǎnquǎnpáng
- Japanese name(s): 犬/いぬ inu (犭) 獣偏/けものへん kemonohen
- Hangul: 개 gae (犭) 개사슴록변 gaesaseumnokbyeon

Stroke order animation

Radical 94 (犬部), which means dog, is one of the 34 Kangxi radicals (214 radicals in total) composed of 4 strokes.

In the Kangxi Dictionary, there are 444 characters (out of 49,030) to be found under this radical.

犬 is also the 66th indexing component in the Table of Indexing Chinese Character Components predominantly adopted by Simplified Chinese dictionaries published in mainland China, with 犭 being its associated indexing component.

In Japanese, 犬 is a Kanji symbol, and its Hiragana version is "いぬ" (inu).

犬, just like most Kanji, is used in both Japanese and Chinese languages.

The symbol is pronounced "quăn" in Chinese.

== Evolution ==
Unrelated to 大.

Shang dynasty Oracle bone script

Shang dynasty Bronze script

Western Zhou Bronze script

Chu slip and silk script

Large seal script character

Small seal script character

== Derived characters ==
Strokes	Characters
+0	犬 犭^{Component only}
+1	犮
+2	犯 犰
+3	犱 犲 犳 犴 犵 状^{SC/JP} (=狀) 犷^{SC} (=獷) 犸^{SC} (=獁)
+4	犹^{SC} (=猶) 犺 犻 犼 犽 犾 犿 狀 狁 狂 狃 狄 狅 狆 狇 狈^{SC} (=狽)
+5	狉 狊 狋 狌 狍 狎 狏 狐 狑 狒 狓 狔 狕 狖 狗 狘 狙 狚 狛 狜 狝^{SC} (=獮) 狞^{SC} (=獰)
+6	狟 狠 狡 狢 狣 狤 狥 狦 狧 狨 狩 狪 狫 独^{SC/JP} (=獨) 狭^{SC/JP} (=狹) 狮^{SC} (=獅) 狯^{SC} (=獪) 狰^{SC} (=猙) 狱^{SC} (=獄) 狲^{SC} (=猻)
+7	倐 狳 狴 狵 狶 狷 狸 狹 狺 狻 狼 狽 狾 狿 猀 猁 猂 猃^{SC} (=獫)
+8	猄 猅 猆 猇 猈 猉 猊 猋 猌 猍 猎^{SC} (=獵) 猏 猐 猑 猒 猓 猔 猕^{SC} (=獼) 猖 猗 猘 猙 猚 猛 猜 猝 猞 猟^{JP} (=獵) 猠 猡^{SC} (=玀) 猪^{SC/JP} (=豬) 猫^{SC/JP variant} (=貓 -> 豸) 猧^{GB TC variant}
+9	猢 猣 猤 猥 猦 猧^{Traditional variant} 猨 猩 猬 猭 献^{SC/JP} (=獻) 猯 猰 猱 猲 猳 猴 猵 猶 猷 猸 猹
+10	猺 猻 猼 猽 猾 猿 獀 獁 獂 獃 獄 獅 獆 獇 獈 獉 獊 獓^{SC variant} 獒^{SC variant} 獏^{SC variant}
+11	獌 獍 獎 獏^{TC variant} 獐 獑 獒^{TC variant} 獓^{TC variant} 獔 獕 獚^{SC variant}
+12	獋 (=獋) 獖 獗 獘 獙 獚^{TC variant} 獛 獜 獝 獞 獟 獠 獡 獢 獣^{JP} (=獸) 獤 獦^{SC variant}
+13	獥 獦^{TC variant} 獧 獨 獩 獪 獫 獬 獭^{SC} (=獺) 獲^{JP/GB TC variant}
+14	獮 獯 獰 獱 獲^{Traditional variant} 獳 獴^{SC variant} 獷^{GB TC variant}
+15	獴^{TC variant} 獵 獶 獷^{Traditional variant} 獸
+16	獹 獺 獻
+17	獼 獽 獾^{SC variant}
+18	獾^{TC variant} 獿
+19	玀
+20	玁 玂 玃

== Hanzi ==
This functions as a Hanzi and a 1st grade Kyōiku kanji.

== Literature ==
- Fazzioli, Edoardo (1987). Chinese calligraphy : from pictograph to ideogram : the history of 214 essential Chinese/Japanese characters. calligraphy by Rebecca Hon Ko. New York: Abbeville Press. ISBN 0-89659-774-1.
- Lunde, Ken (Jan 5, 2009). "Appendix J: Japanese Character Sets" (PDF). CJKV Information Processing: Chinese, Japanese, Korean & Vietnamese Computing (Second ed.). Sebastopol, Calif.: O'Reilly Media. ISBN 978-0-596-51447-1.
