= Radical 166 =

Chinese character radical

里
- Radical 166 (U+2FA5)
- 里 (U+91CC) "village, li (distance unit)"

Pronunciations
- Pinyin: lǐ
- Bopomofo: ㄌㄧˇ
- Wade–Giles: li3
- Cantonese Yale: lei5
- Jyutping: lei5
- Japanese Kana: リ ri (on'yomi) さと sato (kun'yomi)
- Sino-Korean: 리 ri
- Hán-Việt: lý, lí

Names
- Japanese name(s): 里/さと sato (Left) 里偏/さとへん satohen
- Hangul: 마을 maeul

Stroke order animation

Radical 166 or radical village (里部) meaning "village" or "li" (a traditional Chinese unit of distance) is one of the 20 Kangxi radicals (214 radicals in total) composed of 7 strokes.

In the Kangxi Dictionary, there are 14 characters (out of 49,030) to be found under this radical.

里 is also the 157th indexing component in the Table of Indexing Chinese Character Components predominantly adopted by Simplified Chinese dictionaries published in mainland China.

In Simplified Chinese, 裏 or 裡 which mean "inside" is merged to 里.

== Evolution ==
Bronze script character

Small seal script character

== Derived characters ==
| Strokes | Characters |
|---|---|
| +0 | 里 (also SC form of 裏/裡 -> 衣) |
| +2 | 重 |
| +4 | 野 |
| +5 | 量 |
| +11 | 釐 |

== Sinogram ==
The radical is also used as an independent Chinese character. It is one of the Kyōiku kanji or Kanji taught in elementary school in Japan. It is a second grade kanji.

== Literature ==
- Fazzioli, Edoardo (1987). Chinese calligraphy : from pictograph to ideogram : the history of 214 essential Chinese/Japanese characters. calligraphy by Rebecca Hon Ko. New York: Abbeville Press. ISBN 0-89659-774-1.
