= Radical 53 =

Chinese character radical

广
- Radical 53 (U+2F34)
- 广 (U+5E7F) "house on cliff"

Pronunciations
- Pinyin: yǎn
- Bopomofo: ㄧㄢˇ
- Gwoyeu Romatzyh: yean
- Wade–Giles: yen^{3}
- Cantonese Yale: yím
- Jyutping: jim2
- Pe̍h-ōe-jī: iám
- Japanese Kana: ゲン gen (on'yomi)
- Sino-Korean: 엄 eom

Names
- Chinese name(s): 廣字頭/广字头 guǎngzìtóu
- Japanese name(s): 麻垂/まだれ madare
- Hangul: 집 jip

Stroke order animation

Radical 53 or radical dotted cliff (广部) meaning "house on cliff" is one of the 31 Kangxi radicals (214 radicals in total) composed of three strokes.

In the Kangxi Dictionary, there are 291 characters (out of 49,030) to be found under this radical.

广 is also the 46th indexing component in the Table of Indexing Chinese Character Components predominantly adopted by Simplified Chinese dictionaries published in mainland China. In addition, this character is also the simplified form of 廣 guǎng, hence called 廣字頭/广字头 guǎngzìtóu chiefly by Simplified Chinese users.

== Evolution ==
Similar to 宀; unrelated to ⼚ and 疒.

Bronze script character

Large Seal Script Character

Small Seal Script Character

== Derived characters ==
Strokes	Characters
+0	广 (also SC form of 廣)
+2	庀 庁^{JP} (=廳) 庂 (=仄 -> 人) 広^{JP} (=廣)
+3	庄 (also SC from of 莊 -> 艸) 庅 (=麼 -> 麻) 庆^{SC} (=慶 -> 心)
+4	庇 庈 庉 床 庋 庌 庍 庎 序 庐^{SC} (=廬) 庑^{SC} (=廡) 庒 (=庄=莊 -> 艸) 库^{SC} (=庫) 应^{SC} (=應 -> 心) 庘
+5	底 庖 店 庙^{SC} (=廟) 庚 庛 府 庝 庞^{SC} (=龐) 废^{SC} (=廢)
+6	庠 庡 庢 庣 庤 庥 度
+7	座 庨 庩 庪 庫 庬 庭 庮 庯
+8	庰 庱 庲 庳 庴 庵 庶 康 庸 庹 庺 庻 (=庶) 庼^{SC} (=廎)
+9	庽 (=寓 -> 宀) 庾 庿 (=廟) 廀 廁 廂 廃^{JP} (=廢) 廊
+10	廅 廆 廇 廈 廉 廋 廌
+11	廄 廍 廎 廏 (=廄) 廐 (=廄) 廑 廒 廓 廔 廕 廖 廗 廘 廣^{GB TC variant}
+12	廙 廚 廛 廜 廝 廞 廟 廠 廡 廢 廣^{Traditional variant} 廤
+13	廥 廦 廧 廨 廩 廪^{SC} (=廩)
+15	廫
+16	廬 廭 龐
+17	廮 廯 廰 (=廳)
+18	廱
+19	廲
+22	廳

== Literature ==
- Fazzioli, Edoardo (1987). Chinese calligraphy : from pictograph to ideogram : the history of 214 essential Chinese/Japanese characters. calligraphy by Rebecca Hon Ko. New York: Abbeville Press. ISBN 0-89659-774-1.
- Lunde, Ken (Jan 5, 2009). "Appendix J: Japanese Character Sets" (PDF). CJKV Information Processing: Chinese, Japanese, Korean & Vietnamese Computing (Second ed.). Sebastopol, Calif.: O'Reilly Media. ISBN 978-0-596-51447-1.
