= Radical 159 =

Chinese character radical

車
- Radical 159 (U+2F9E)
- 車 (U+8ECA) "cart, car"

Pronunciations
- Pinyin: chē
- Bopomofo: ㄔㄜ
- Wade–Giles: ch'e1
- Cantonese Yale: che1, geui1
- Jyutping: ce1, geoi1
- Japanese Kana: シャ sha (on'yomi) くるま kuruma (kun'yomi)
- Sino-Korean: 거 geo
- Hán-Việt: xa, xe, xế

Names
- Chinese name(s): (Left) 車字旁/车字旁 chēzìpáng (Bottom) 車字底/车字底 chēzìdǐ
- Japanese name(s): 車/くるま kuruma 車偏/くるまへん kurumahen
- Hangul: 수레 sure

Stroke order animation

Stroke order of the simplified form 车

Stroke order of the simplified left component form 车

Radical 159 or radical cart (車部), which means "cart" or "car" is one of the 20 Kangxi radicals (214 radicals in total) composed of 7 strokes. In the Kangxi Dictionary, there are 361 characters (out of 49,030) to be found under this radical. 车, the simplified form of 車, is the 68th indexing component in the Table of Indexing Chinese Character Components predominantly adopted by Simplified Chinese dictionaries published in mainland China, while the traditional form 車 is listed as its associated indexing components. 车 is derived from the cursive form of 車.

== Evolution ==
Shang dynasty Oracle bone script

Shang dynasty Oracle bone script variant

Shang dynasty Bronze script

Western Zhou Bronze script

Western Zhou Bronze script variant

Spring and Autumn period bronze script

Warring States period bronze script

Chu slip and silk script

Qin slip script

Shuowen Zhou script

Large seal script character

Small seal script character

== Derived characters ==
Strokes	Characters (車)	Characters (车)
+0	車	车^{SC} (=車)
+1	軋	轧^{SC} (=軋)
+2	軌 軍 轨^{SC} (=軌)	
+3	軎 (=轊) 軏 軐 軑 軒 軓 軔 軕	轩^{SC} (=軒) 轪^{SC} (=軑) 轫^{SC} (=軔)
+4	軖 軗 軘 軙 軚 軛 軜 軝 軞 軟 軠 軡 転^{JP} (=轉) 軣^{JP nonstandard} (=轟)	转^{SC} (=轉) 轭^{SC} (=軛) 轮^{SC} (=輪) 软^{SC} (=軟) 轰^{SC} (=轟)
+5	軤 軥 軦 軧 軨 軩 軪 軫 軬 軮 軯 軰 軱 軲 軳 軴 軵 軶 (=軛) 軷 軸 軹 軺 軻 軼 軽^{JP} (=輕; also variant form of 輊)	轱^{SC} (=軲) 轲^{SC} (=軻) 轳^{SC} (=轤) 轴^{SC} (=軸) 轵^{SC} (=軹) 轶^{SC} (=軼) 轷^{SC} (=軤) 轸^{SC} (=軫) 轹^{SC} (=轢) 轺^{SC} (=軺) 轻^{SC} (=輕)
+6	軭 軾 軿 輀 輁 輂 較 輄 輅 輆 輇 輈 載 輊 輋 輌^{JP} (=輛)	轼^{SC} (=軾) 载^{SC} (=載) 轾^{SC} (=輊) 轿^{SC} (=轎) 辀^{SC} (=輈) 辁^{SC} (=輇) 辂^{SC} (=輅) 较^{SC} (=較)
+7	輍 輎 輏 輐 輑 輒 輓 輔 輕	辄^{SC} (=輒) 辅^{SC} (=輔) 辆^{SC} (=輛)
+8	輖 輗 輘 輙 (=輒) 輚 輛 輜 輝 輞 輟 輠 輡 輢 輣 輤 輥 輦 輧 輨 輩 輪 輫 輬	辇^{SC} (=輦) 辈^{SC} (=輩) 辉^{SC} (=輝) 辊^{SC} (=輥) 辋^{SC} (=輞) 辌^{SC} (=輬) 辍^{SC} (=輟) 辎^{SC} (=輜)
+9	輭 (=軟) 輮 輯 輰 輱 輲 輳 輴 輵 輶 輷 輸 輹 輺 (=輜) 輻 輼^{HK/GB TC} (=轀)	辏^{SC} (=輳) 辐^{SC} (=輻) 辑^{SC} (=輯) 辒^{SC} (=轀) 输^{SC} (=輸) 辔^{SC} (=轡)
+10	輽 (=軬) 輾 輿 轀 轁 轂 轃 轄 轅	辕^{SC} (=轅) 辖^{SC} (=轄) 辗^{SC} (=輾)
+11	轆 轇 轈 轉 轊 轋 轌	辘^{SC} (=轆)
+12	轍 轎 轏 轐 轑 轒 轓 轔	辙^{SC} (=轍) 辚^{SC} (=轔)
+13	轕 轖 轗 轘 轙 轚	
+14	轛 轜 轝 轞 轟	
+15	轠 轡 轢	
+16	轣 轤	
+20	轥	

== Hanzi ==
It is an independent Hanzi and 1st grade Kyōiku kanji

== Literature ==
- Fazzioli, Edoardo (1987). Chinese calligraphy : from pictograph to ideogram : the history of 214 essential Chinese/Japanese characters. calligraphy by Rebecca Hon Ko. New York: Abbeville Press. ISBN 0-89659-774-1.
