= Radical 203 =

Chinese character radical

黑
- Radical 203 (U+2FCA)
- 黑 (U+9ED1) "black"

Pronunciations
- Pinyin: hēi
- Bopomofo: ㄏㄟ
- Wade–Giles: hei1
- Cantonese Yale: haak1, hak1
- Jyutping: haak1, hak1
- Japanese Kana: コク koku (on'yomi) くろ kuro / くろ-い kuro-i (kun'yomi)
- Sino-Korean: 흑 heuk
- Hán-Việt: hắc

Names
- Japanese name(s): 黒/くろ kuro
- Hangul: 검을 geomeu

Stroke order animation

Radical 203 or radical black (黑部) meaning "black" is one of the 4 Kangxi radicals (214 radicals in total) composed of 12 strokes.

In the Kangxi Dictionary, there are 172 characters (out of 49,030) to be found under this radical.

黑 is also the 196th indexing component in the Table of Indexing Chinese Character Components predominantly adopted by Simplified Chinese dictionaries published in mainland China.

This radical character is simplified as 黒 in Japanese jōyō kanji.

== Evolution ==
Shang dynasty Oracle bone script

Western Zhou Bronze script

Spring and Autumn period bronze script

Chu slip and silk script

Qin slip script

Large seal script character

Small seal script character

== Derived characters ==
Strokes	Characters
+0	黑 黒^{JP} (=黑)
+3	墨^{SC/TC/KO}/墨^{JP} 黓
+4	黔 黕 黖 黗 默
+5	黚 黛 黜 黝 點
+6	黟 黠 黡^{SC} (=黶)
+7	黢 黣
+8	黤 黥 黦 黧 黨 黩^{SC} (=黷) 黪^{SC} (=黲)
+9	黫 黬 黭 黮 黯
+10	黰 黱
+11	黲 黳 黴
+13	黵
+14	黶
+15	黷
+16	黸

== Literature ==
- Fazzioli, Edoardo (1987). Chinese calligraphy : from pictograph to ideogram : the history of 214 essential Chinese/Japanese characters. calligraphy by Rebecca Hon Ko. New York: Abbeville Press. ISBN 0-89659-774-1.
- Lunde, Ken (Jan 5, 2009). "Appendix J: Japanese Character Sets" (PDF). CJKV Information Processing: Chinese, Japanese, Korean & Vietnamese Computing (Second ed.). Sebastopol, Calif.: O'Reilly Media. ISBN 978-0-596-51447-1.
