= Radical 118 =

Chinese character radical

竹
- Radical 118 (U+2F75)
- 竹 (U+7AF9) "bamboo"

Pronunciations
- Pinyin: zhú
- Bopomofo: ㄓㄨˊ
- Gwoyeu Romatzyh: jwu
- Wade–Giles: chu^{2}
- Cantonese Yale: juk1
- Jyutping: zuk1
- Japanese Kana: チク chiku (on'yomi) たけ take (kun'yomi)
- Sino-Korean: 죽 juk

Names
- Chinese name(s): 竹字頭/竹字头 zhúzìtóu
- Japanese name(s): 竹/たけ take 竹冠/たけかんむり takekanmuri
- Hangul: 대 dae

Stroke order animation

Radical 118 or radical bamboo (竹部) meaning "bamboo" is one of the 29 Kangxi radicals (214 radicals in total) composed of 6 strokes. The radical character usually appears at the top of characters and transforms into 𥫗.

In the Kangxi Dictionary, 953 characters (out of 49,030) are found under this radical.

竹 is also the 135th indexing component in the Table of Indexing Chinese Character Components predominantly adopted by Simplified Chinese dictionaries published in mainland China, with 𥫗 being its associated indexing component.

== Evolution ==
Shang dynasty Oracle bone script

Shang dynasty Bronze script

Western Zhou Bronze script

Warring States period bronze script

Chu slip and silk script

Qin slip script

Large seal script character

Small seal script character

== Derived characters ==
Strokes	Characters
+0	竹 𥫗^{Component}
+2	竺 竻
+3	竼 竽 竾 (=篪) 竿 笀 笁 笂 笃^{SC} (=篤)
+4	笅 笆 笇 笈 (=籍) 笉 笊 笋^{SC} (=筍) 笌 笍 笎 笏 笐 笑 笒 笓 笔^{SC} (=筆) 笕^{SC} (=筧)
+5	笖 笗 笘 笙 笚 笛 笜 笝 笞 笟 笠 笡 笢 笣 (=苞 -> 艸) 笤 (=苕 -> 艸) 笥 符 笧 (=冊 / -> 冂策) 笨 笩 笪 笫 第 笭 笮 笯 笰 笱 笲 笳 笴 笵 (=範) 笶 笷 笸 笹 笺^{SC} (=箋) 笻 笼^{SC} (=籠) 笽 笾^{SC} (=籩)
+6	笄 笿 筀 筁 筂 (=篪) 筃 筄 筅 筆 筇 筈 等 筊 筋 筌 筍 筎 筏 筐 筑 (=築) 筒 筓 答 筕 策 筗 筘 筙 筚^{SC} (=篳) 筛^{SC} (=篩) 筜^{SC} (=簹) 筝^{SC} (=箏)
+7	筞 (=策) 筟 筠 筡 筢 筣 筤 筥 筦 筧 筨 筩 (=筒) 筪 筫 筬 筭 筮 筯 (=箸) 筰 筱 筲 筳 筴 筵 筶 筷 筸 筹^{SC} (=籌) 筺 筻 筼^{SC} (=篔) 筽 签^{SC} (=簽/籤) 筿 (=篠) 简^{SC} (=簡) 節
+8	箁 箂 箃 箄 箅 箆 (=篦) 箇 (=個 -> 人) 箈 箉 箊 箋 箌 箍 箎 (=篪) 箏 箐 箑 箒 (=帚 -> 巾) 箓^{SC} (=籙) 箔 箕 箖 算 箘 箙 箚 (=劄 -> 刀) 箛 箜 箝 箞 箟 箠 (=棰 -> 木) 管 箢 箣 箤 箥 箦^{SC} (=簀) 箧^{SC} (=篋) 箨^{SC} (=籜) 箩^{SC} (=籮) 箪^{SC} (=簞) 箫^{SC} (=簫)
+9	箬 箭 箮 箯 箰 箱 箲 箳 箴 箵 箶 箷 箸 (=著 -> 艸) 箹 箺 箻 箼 箽 箾 (=簫) 箿 篁 篂 篃 範 篅 篆 篇 篈 篊 篋 篌 篍 篎 篏 篐 篑^{SC} (=簣) 篒 篓^{SC} (=簍)
+10	築 篔 篕 篖 篗 篘 篙 篚 篛 (=箬) 篜 篝 篞 篟 篠 篡 篢 篣 篤 篥 篦 篧 篨 篩 篪 篫 篬 篭^{JP} (=籠) 篮^{SC} (=籃) 篯^{SC} (=籛) 簑 (=蓑 -> 艸) 簕
+11	篰 篱^{SC} (=籬) 篲 篳 篴 (=笛) 篵 篶 篷 篸 篹 (=撰 -> 手 / 饌 -> 食 / 纂 -> 糸) 篺 篻 篼 篽 篾 篿 簀 簁 簂 簃 簄 簅 簆 (=筘) 簇 簈 (=箳) 簉 簊 簋 簌 簍 簎 簏 簐 簒 (=篡) 簓 簔 簖^{SC} (=籪) 簗
+12	簘 (=簫) 簙 簚 簛 (=簁) 簜 簝 簞 簟 簠 簡 簢 簣 簤 簥 簦 簧 簨 簩 簪 簫 簬 簭 簮 (=簪) 簯 簰 簱 簲
+13	簳 簴 簵 簶 簷 (=檐 -> 木) 簸 簹 簺 簻 簼 簽 簾 簿 籀 籁^{SC} (=籟) 籂
+14	籃 籄 籅 籆 籇 籈 籉 籊 籋 籌 籍 籎 籏 籕 籖
+15	籐 籑 (=饌 -> 食 / 撰 -> 手) 籒 籓 籔
+16	籗 籘 (=籐) 籙 籚 籛 籜 籝 (=籯) 籞 籟 籠 籡
+17	籢 籣 籤 籥 籦 籧 籨 (=奩 -> 大)
+18	籪
+19	籩 籫 籬 籭 (=簁) 籮
+20	籯 籰
+24	籱
+26	籲

== Sinogram ==
As an independent sinogram 竹 is a Chinese character. It is one of the kyōiku kanji or kanji taught in elementary school in Japan. It means bamboo or the middle of a 3-tier ranking system.
