= Radical 37 =

Chinese character radical

大
- Radical 37 (U+2F24)
- 大 (U+5927) "big, very"

Pronunciations
- Pinyin: dà
- Bopomofo: ㄉㄚˋ
- Gwoyeu Romatzyh: dah
- Wade–Giles: ta^{4}
- Cantonese Yale: daaih
- Jyutping: daai6
- Pe̍h-ōe-jī: tāi
- Japanese Kana: ダイ dai / タイ tai (on'yomi) おお ō / おお-きい ō-kii (kun'yomi)
- Sino-Korean: 대 dae
- Hán-Việt: Đại

Names
- Chinese name(s): (Top) 大字頭/大字头 dàzìtóu
- Japanese name(s): 大/だい dai (Top) 大頭/だいがしら daigashira (Top) 大冠/だいかんむり daikanmuri
- Hangul: 클 keul

Stroke order animation

Radical 37 or radical big (大部), which means big, great, or very is one of the 31 Kangxi radicals (214 radicals total) composed of three strokes. In the Kangxi Dictionary, there are 132 characters (out of 49,030) to be found under this radical. 大 is also the 33rd indexing component in the Table of Indexing Chinese Character Components predominantly adopted by Simplified Chinese dictionaries published in mainland China.

== Evolution ==
Compare 天; unrelated to 犬.

Shang dynasty Oracle bone script

Shang dynasty Bronze script

Western Zhou Bronze script

Spring and Autumn period bronze script

Warring States period bronze script

Chu slip and silk script

Qin slip script

Large seal script character

Small seal script character

Qing dynasty Clerical script

== Derived characters ==
Strokes	Characters
+0	大 夨
+1	天 太 夫 夬 夭
+2	央 夯 夰 失 夲 夳 头^{SC} (=頭 -> 頁)
+3	夵 夶 (=比 -> 比) 夷 夸 (also SC form of 誇 -> 言) 夹^{SC} (=夾) 夺^{SC} (=奪) 夻 夼
+4	夽 夾 夿 奀 奁^{SC} (=奩) 奂^{SC} (=奐)
+5	奃 奄 奅 奆 奇 奈 奉 奋^{SC} (=奮) 奌 (=點 -> 黑) 奍 奔
+6	奎 奏 奐 契 奒 奓 奕 奖^{SC} (=獎 -> 犬)
+7	奊 套 奘 奙 奚
+8	奛 奜 奝 奞 奟
+9	奠 奡 奢 奣 奤 奥^{SC/JP} (=奧)
+10	奦 奧 奨^{JP} (=獎 -> 犬)
+11	奩 奪 奫 奬 (=獎 -> 犬)
+12	奭
+13	奮 奯
+15	奰
+19	奱
+21	奲

== Hanzi ==
This functions as a Hanzi and a 1st grade Kyōiku kanji.
