= Stroke orders of CJK Unified Ideographs (YES order) =

Method for ordering Han characters

Stroke orders of CJK Unified Ideographs (YES order) is a list of stroke orders of the CJK Unified Ideographs sorted in YES order, a simpler alternative to the traditional Radical order employed in CJK Unified Ideographs (Unicode block), List of CJK Unified Ideographs, part 1, part 2, part 3, part 4.

== Stroke order ==
A stroke order is the order in which strokes are written to form a Chinese character. It can be expressed as a sequence of strokes. For example, "札: ㇐㇑㇓㇔㇟". The stroke orders in the list of the present article are expressed with the YES stroke alphabet of 30 different strokes, a more accurate version based on the standard of GB13000.1 Character Set Chinese Character Order (Stroke-Based Order), which uses 5 stroke types (written as 1, 2, 3, 4 and 5). For example, the stroke order of character "札" is represented as:

札 (GB) : 12345,
札 (YES): ㇐㇑㇓㇔㇟.

== YES order ==
YES is a simplified stroke-based sorting method free of stroke counting and grouping, without comprise in accuracy. Briefly speaking, YES arranges Chinese characters according to their stroke orders and an "alphabet" of 30 strokes:

㇐ ㇕ ㇅ ㇎ ㇡ ㇋ ㇊ ㇍ ㇈ ㇆ ㇇ ㇌  ㇀ ㇑ ㇗ ㇞ ㇉ ㄣ ㇙ ㇄ ㇟ ㇚ ㇓ ㇜ ㇛ ㇢ ㇔ ㇏ ㇂

built on the basis of Unicode CJK strokes.

== Character list with stroke orders ==
This is a list of stroke orders of the 20,992 CJK Unified Ideographs (Unicode block) sorted in YES order. It is too big to display here as a whole, and has been split into 4 parts with links as follows:

- Stroke orders of CJK Unified Ideographs in YES order, part 1 of 4 (characters starting with 一)
- Stroke orders of CJK Unified Ideographs in YES order, part 2 of 4 (characters starting with ㇑)
- Stroke orders of CJK Unified Ideographs in YES order, part 3 of 4 (characters starting with ㇓)
- Stroke orders of CJK Unified Ideographs in YES order, part 4 of 4 (characters starting with ㇔)

The present list is based on the PRC standards. Versions based on the standards of Taiwan and other regions will also be developed.
