= Stroke number =

Number of strokes of a Chinese character

Stroke number, or stroke count (simplified Chinese: 笔画数; traditional Chinese: 筆畫數; pinyin: bǐhuà shù), is the number of strokes of a Chinese character. It may also refer to the number of different strokes in a Chinese character set. Stroke number plays an important role in Chinese character sorting, teaching and computer information processing.

Stroke numbers vary dramatically, for example, characters "丶", "一" and "乙" have only one stroke, while character "齉" has 36 strokes, and "龘" (three 龍s, dragons) 48 strokes. The Chinese character with the most strokes in the entire Unicode character set (as of Unicode 16) is "𱁬" (three 雲s and three 龍s) of 84 strokes. In recent years, some ultra high stroke characters such as "" (pinyin: huáng) with 172 strokes have become popular in online communities. However, such characters are not considered standard.

== Stroke counting ==
There are effective methods to count the strokes of a Chinese character correctly. First of all, stroke counting is to be carried out on the standard regular form (楷體, 楷体) of the character, and according to its stroke order, e.g., by writing the character stroke by stroke (in one's mind). On the same stroke, the tip of the pen can only move along a path once, not allowed to go back. Strokes "㇐" (heng, 横) and "㇀" (ti, 提) are written from left to right, and strokes "㇑" (shu, 竖), "㇓" (pie, 撇), "㇔" (dian, 点) and "㇏" (na, 捺) are written from top to bottom. And if needed, a standard list of strokes or list of stroke orders issued by the authoritative institution should be consulted.

If two strokes are connected at the endpoints, whether they are separated into two strokes or linked into one stroke can be judged by the following rules:

- If the two strokes are connected in the upper left corner of a character or component, then separate them into two strokes, such as: 厂 (stroke order: ㇐㇓), 口 (㇑㇕㇐) and 日 (㇑㇕㇐㇐).
- If they are connected in the upper right corner, then one stroke, such as: 口 (㇑㇕㇐), 月 (㇓㇆㇐㇐), 句 (㇓㇆㇑㇕㇐).
- If they are connected in the lower left corner, then if it is a fully enclosed structure, then count as two separated strokes, such as: 口 (㇑㇕㇐), 回 (㇑㇕㇑㇕㇐㇐), 田 (㇑㇕㇐㇑㇐); (Note: exceptions: 惯, 實, 母, 马, 鸟, 乌) if it is not fully enclosed, then count as one stroke, such as: 山 (㇑㇗㇑), 区 (㇐㇓㇔㇗), 葛 (㇐㇑㇑㇑㇕㇐㇐㇓㇆㇓㇔㇗) . (Note: exceptions: 馬; 巨(Taiwan: 12511；Mainland：1515))
- If they are connected in the lower right corner, then two strokes, such as: 口 (㇑㇕㇐), 回 (㇑㇕㇑㇕㇐㇐), 田 (㇑㇕㇐㇑㇐).

An important prerequisite for connecting two strokes into one is: the tail of the first stroke is connected with the head of the second stroke.

Some characters or components have the same shape in the China Mainland and Taiwan, but the numbers of strokes are different, such as "之 (Mainland China: ㇔㇇㇏, 3 strokes), 之 (Taiwan: ㇔㇀㇓㇏ 4)", "阝 (M: ㇌㇑, 2), 阝 (T: ㇇㇢㇑, 3)”.

The number of strokes of some characters are easy to be mis-counted, such as 凹 (㇑㇅㇑㇕㇐, 5 strokes), 凸 (㇑㇐㇑㇎㇐, 5), 鼎(㇑㇕㇐㇐㇐㇞㇐㇓㇑㇐㇑㇕, 12).

== Distribution of characters ==
In the following, there are several tables of statistical data illustrating the distributions of Chinese characters among all stroke numbers of some representative character sets.

=== Chart of Standard Forms of Common National Characters (Taiwan) ===
Chart of Standard Forms of Common National Characters (常用國字標準字體表) is a standard character set of 4,808 characters issued by the Ministry of Education of Taiwan (ROC).

Numbers of strokes and their numbers of characters in the "Common National Characters"
strokes	characters	%
1	2	0.042
2	17	0.354
3	39	0.811
4	91	1.893
5	125	2.600
6	159	3.307
7	256	5.324
8	351	7.300
9	356	7.404
10	404	8.403
11	447	9.297
12	427	8.881
13	399	8.299
14	342	7.113
15	341	7.092
16	256	5.324
17	231	4.804
18	145	3.016
19	122	2.537
20	85	1.768
21	66	1.373
22	51	1.061
23	32	0.666
24	31	0.645
25	12	0.250
26	5	0.104
27	8	0.166
28	3	0.062
29	3	0.062
30	1	0.021
32	1	0.021

The stroke numbers of characters range from 1 to 32 strokes. The 11-strokes group has the most characters, taking 9.297% of the character set. On the average, there are 12.186 strokes per character.

=== List of Frequently Used Characters in Modern Chinese (Mainland) ===
The List of Frequently Used Characters in Modern Chinese (现代汉语常用字表) is a standard character set of 3,500 characters issued by the Ministry of Education of the People's Republic of China, 26 Jan 1988.

Numbers of strokes and their numbers of characters in the "List of Frequently-Used Characters in Modern Chinese"
strokes	characters	%
1	2	0.057
2	19	0.543
3	50	1.429
4	113	3.229
5	151	4.314
6	250	7.143
7	341	9.743
8	408	11.657
9	415	11.857
10	391	11.171
11	350	10.000
12	320	9.143
13	232	6.629
14	140	4.000
15	126	3.600
16	78	2.229
17	51	1.457
18	16	0.457
19	20	0.571
20	15	0.429
21	6	0.171
22	4	0.114
23	1	0.029
24	1	0.029

The stroke numbers of characters range from 1 to 24 strokes. The 9-strokes characters are the most, taking 11.857% of the character set. On the average, there are 9.7409 strokes per character.

=== List of Commonly Used Characters in Modern Chinese (Mainland) ===
The List of Commonly Used Characters in Modern Chinese (现代汉语通用字表) is also a standard character set issued by the Ministry of Education of the People's Republic of China. There are 7,000 characters, including the 3,500 characters in the List of Frequently Used Characters in Modern Chinese.

Numbers of strokes and their numbers of characters in the "List of Commonly Used Characters in Modern Chinese"
strokes	characters	%
1	2	0.03
2	21	0.30
3	59	0.84
4	136	2.00
5	201	2.87
6	346	4.94
7	545	7.79
8	690	9.86
9	785	11.21
10	761	10.87
11	726	10.38
12	678	9.68
13	549	7.84
14	412	5.88
15	331	4.73
16	276	3.94
17	185	2.64
18	90	1.29
19	81	1.16
20	47	0.67
21	28	0.41
22	22	0.31
23	12	0.17
24	8	0.11
25	6	0.085
26	1	0.015
30	1	0.015
36	1	0.015

The stroke numbers of characters range from 1 to 36 strokes. The 9-strokes group has the most characters, taking 11.21% of the character set. On the average, there are 10.75 strokes per character.

=== Cihai ===
The following statistic data comes from an experiment conducted on all the 16,339 traditional and simplified characters of Cihai (辞海; 辭海, 1979).

Numbers of strokes and their numbers of characters in Cihai
strokes	characters	%
1	3	0.018
2	23	0.141
3	74	0.453
4	163	0.998
5	216	1.597
6	462	2.828
7	825	5.049
8	1084	6.634
9	1276	7.810
10	1371	8.391
11	1453	8.893
12	1553	9.505
13	1365	8.354
14	1190	7.283
15	1132	6.928
16	961	5.882
17	788	4.823
18	569	3.482
19	499	3.054
20	370	2.265
21	263	1.610
22	208	1.273
23	159	0.973
24	122	0.747
25	65	0.398
26	36	0.220
27	28	0.171
28	15	0.092
29	8	0.049
30	6	0.037
31	1	0.006
32	2	0.012
33	2	0.012
35	1	0.006
36	1	0.006

The stroke numbers of characters range from 1 to 36 strokes. The 12-strokes group has the most characters, taking 9.505% of the character set. On the average, there are 12.7061 strokes per character.

=== Unicode Basic CJK Unified Ideographs ===
The Unicode Basic CJK Unified Ideographs is an international standard character set issued by ISO and Unicode, the same character set of the Chinese national standard 13000.1. There are 20,902 Chinese characters, including simplified and traditional characters from China, Japan and Korea (CJK).

Numbers of strokes and their numbers of characters in the "Unicode Basic CJK Unified Ideographs"
strokes	characters	%
1	10	0.048
2	44	0.211
3	98	0.469
4	204	0.976
5	331	1.584
6	583	2.789
7	966	4.622
8	1300	6.220
9	1541	7.373
10	1709	8.176
11	1859	8.894
12	1956	9.358
13	1741	8.329
14	1570	7.511
15	1516	7.253
16	1292	6.181
17	1012	4.842
18	771	3.689
19	692	3.311
20	501	2.397
21	350	1.674
22	274	1.311
23	197	0.942
24	152	0.727
25	83	0.397
26	48	0.230
27	43	0.206
28	27	0.129
29	10	0.048
30	10	0.048
31	1	0.005
32	3	0.014
33	4	0.019
35	1	0.005
36	1	0.005
39	1	0.005
48	1	0.005

The stroke numbers of characters range from 1 to 48 strokes. The 12-strokes group has the most characters, taking 9.358% of the character set. On the average, there are 12.845 strokes per character.

=== Characteristics ===
From the data of the previous tables, some valuable cross-table characteristics can be found:

- The average number of strokes per character of the simplified Chinese writing system is less than the traditional writing system. There is a 9.7409: 12.186 strokes per character is the ratio between the two standard frequently used character sets of China mainland (simplified Chinese) and Taiwan (traditional Chinese).
- According to the data of the second and third tables, the average number of strokes of the 3,500 frequently used characters is 9.74, and the average number of strokes of the 7.000 commonly used characters (a super set of the 3,500 characters) is 10.75. That means generally speaking, frequently used characters have less strokes than less frequently used characters.
- The numbers of characters for each number of strokes are in normal distribution, i.e., high in the middle and gradually low in both sides, with the peak numbers of characters ranging between 9 and 12 strokes in the five tables. Here is an explanation: To be easy to read or recognize, the forms (or glyphs) of Chinese characters should be sufficiently differentiated from each other, and to be easy to write, the characters should be relatively simple. The former condition requires the number of strokes of a character not to be too small, while the latter condition requires the number of strokes not to be too large. Under the action of these two forces, the normal distribution is formed.

== Stroke types ==
The term stroke number may also refer to the number of different strokes in the Chinese character writing system, or the number of stroke types in a stroke table. How many types of strokes are there in Chinese characters? Scholars’ opinions are not entirely consistent. For example, for the purpose of Chinese teaching and reference book compilation, the categories are usually relatively small; from the perspective of calligraphy art and glyph design, there are much more. For example, stroke "shu (丨)" can be further divided into "long shu", "short shu", and "hanging needle shu", etc., and "pie (丿)" can be divided into "flat pie", "slant pie", and "vertical pie".

=== Five types ===
Current national standards such as "Stroke Orders of Commonly-used Standard Chinese Characters" and many reference books published in China mainland have adopted the five categories of

heng (横, 一), shu (竖, 丨), pie (撇, 丿), dian (点, 丶), zhe (折, 𠃍), 

and stipulate the heng-shu-pie-dian-zhe order. In Hong Kong, Taiwan and some other places, people also use the order of dian-heng-shu-pie-zhe (點橫豎撇折)

=== Eight types ===
In this classification, Chinese strokes are divided into eight categories:

heng (横, ㇐),  ti (提, ㇀),  shu (竖, ㇑), pie (撇, ㇓), dian (点, ㇔), na (捺, ㇏), zhe (折, ㇕), gou (钩, ㇆).

Because the character "永" (yǒng, forever) happens to contain strokes similar to these eight types of stroke forms, this classification is also called the "Eight Principles of Yong".

=== Unicode CJK strokes ===
The Unicode CJK strokes list has 37 types of strokes, including the newly added character subtraction at the end:

CJK Strokes^{[1]}^{[2]} Official Unicode Consortium code chart (PDF)
	0	1	2	3	4	5	6	7	8	9	A	B	C	D	E	F
U+31Cx	㇀	㇁	㇂	㇃	㇄	㇅	㇆	㇇	㇈	㇉	㇊	㇋	㇌	㇍	㇎	㇏
U+31Dx	㇐	㇑	㇒	㇓	㇔	㇕	㇖	㇗	㇘	㇙	㇚	㇛	㇜	㇝	㇞	㇟
U+31Ex	㇠	㇡	㇢	㇣	㇤	㇥										㇯
Notes 1.As of Unicode version 17.0 2.Grey areas indicate non-assigned code points

=== YES stroke alphabet ===
The YES Stroke Alphabet, which is employed by YES stroke alphabetical order, is a list of 30 strokes:

㇐ ㇕ ㇅ ㇎ ㇡ ㇋ ㇊ ㇍ ㇈ ㇆ ㇇ ㇌ ⺄ ㇀ ㇑ ㇗ ㇞ ㇉ ㄣ ㇙ ㇄ ㇟ ㇚ ㇓ ㇜ ㇛ ㇢ ㇔ ㇏ ㇂.

For more details about Chinese character stroke types and stroke tables, please see Chinese character strokes#Stroke form.

== See also ==
- Chinese character strokes
- Chinese characters
- Modern Chinese characters
