= Radical 95 =

Chinese character radical

玄
- Radical 95 (U+2F5E)
- 玄 (U+7384) "dark, profound"

Pronunciations
- Pinyin: xuán
- Bopomofo: ㄒㄩㄢˊ
- Wade–Giles: hsüan2
- Cantonese Yale: yùhn
- Jyutping: jyun4
- Japanese Kana: ケン ken / ゲン gen (on'yomi) くろい kuroi (kun'yomi)
- Sino-Korean: 현 hyeon

Names
- Japanese name(s): 玄/げん gen
- Hangul: 검을 geomeul

Stroke order animation

Radical 95 or radical profound (玄部) meaning "dark" or "profound" is one of the 23 Kangxi radicals (214 radicals in total) composed of 5 strokes.

In the Kangxi Dictionary, there are only six characters (out of 49,030) to be found under this radical. In addition, the final dot stroke of the character in the Kangxi Dictionary was omitted (𤣥) to avoid using the same character in Kangxi Emperor's name 玄燁 (see naming taboo).

This radical is not used in Simplified Chinese dictionaries.

== Evolution ==
Compound of 幺 ("thread") + 亠.

Bronze script character

Large seal script character

Small seal script character

== Derived characters ==
| Strokes | Characters |
|---|---|
| +0 | 玄 ("dark, deep, profound, abstruse") |
| +4 | 玅 (=妙 -> 女, "mysterious, subtle, exquisite") |
| +5 | 玆 ("now, here; this; time, year") |
| +6 | 率 ("to lead; ratio; rate, frequency; limit") 玈 ("black") |

== Variant forms ==
There is a design nuance in different printing typefaces for this radical character, akin to the differences found in radical 亠 and 幺. Traditionally, the first stroke is a vertical dot in printing typefaces, and the two turning strokes are broken into two respectively to adapt to the carving of movable type systems, and usually there is a gap between the third and the fourth strokes. Currently, in both Simplified Chinese and Traditional Chinese, the first stroke becomes a slant dot, and the discontinuous turning strokes are merged into one to imitate its handwriting form, though the traditional printing form is still widely used in Traditional Chinese publication. The traditional form remains standard in modern Japanese and Korean printing typefaces.

The difference of the upper part 亠 applies to both printing typefaces and handwriting forms; The difference of the lower part 幺 exists only in printing typefaces, not in any handwriting form.

| Traditional Typefaces | Handwriting form Modern Chinese |
|---|---|
| 玄 | 玄 |

== Sinogram ==
As an independent sinogram it is a Jōyō kanji, or a kanji used in writing the Japanese language. It is a secondary school kanji. It refers to the color of the night sky.

== See also ==
- List of jōyō kanji
