= Pinyin alphabetical order =

Sound-based Chinese character sorting method

Pinyin alphabetical order, also called Pinyin-based order, or Pinyin order in short, is a sound-based Chinese character sorting method which has been used for arrangement of entries in Xinhua Dictionary, Xiandai Hanyu Cidian, Oxford Chinese Dictionary and many other modern dictionaries. In this method, Chinese characters are arranged according to the order of the Latin alphabet adopted in "Chinese Pinyin Scheme".

Pinyin alphabetical order is applicable to the ordering of both Chinese characters and words. It is primarily of alphabetical order and thus more simple and internationally acceptable than the traditional Radical-and-stroke sorting. The serious disadvantage of pinyin order lies in its inability to support lookup of words without knowing their pronunciations.

== Sorting single Chinese characters ==
The rules for sorting two Chinese characters into pinyin order are as follows:

=== Rule of basic alphabet ===
To arrange two Chinese characters into basic alphabetical order, first compare the first letters of the pinyin letter strings of the two characters. If they are different, arrange the characters according to the letters' order in the alphabet (for example, 李 (lǐ) comes before 張 (zhāng), because the initial letter ⟨l⟩ is before initial letter ⟨z⟩ in the alphabet); if the first letters are the same, compare the second letters of both sides, and so on, until a pair of letters that are not the same is found and the Chinese characters are ordered accordingly (for example, 長 (cháng) comes before 陳 (chén) because the third letter ⟨a⟩ precedes ⟨e⟩). If the last letter of one of the strings is compared and the letters on both sides are still the same, then the shorter string comes first (for example, 陳 (chén) comes before 程 (chéng)).

=== Rule of ê and ü ===
For two Chinese characters with the same pinyin basic letters, if there is a difference of basic letter ⟨e⟩ and modified letter ⟨ê⟩, or of basic letter ⟨u⟩ and modified letter ⟨ü⟩, then the pinyin with a modified letter comes after the pinyin without a modified letter. According to the "Index of Chinese Pinyin Syllables" in Xinhua Dictionary, this rule only involves three pairs of syllables: ⟨e⟩ comes before ⟨ê⟩ e.g. 額 (è), 欸 (ê̄), ⟨lu⟩ before ⟨lü⟩ e.g. 路 (lù), 驢 (lǘ), and ⟨nu⟩ before ⟨nü⟩ e.g. 努 (nǔ), 女 (nǚ).

=== Rule of tones ===
Characters of the same pinyin letters (including modified letters ê and ü) are arranged according to their tones in the order of "first tone ("flat tone"), second tone (rising tone), third tone (falling-rising tone), fourth tone (falling tone), fifth tone (neutral tone)" (e.g. 媽 (mā), 麻 (má), 馬 (mǎ), 罵 (mà), 嗎 (ma)). (Note: There is an exception: In ABC Chinese–English Dictionary the tone order is "zero tone (neutral tone), first tone (flat tone), second tone (rising tone), third tone (falling-rising tone) and fourth tone (falling tone)".)

For a complete list of Chinese syllables sorted in pinyin order, please refer to the "Index of Chinese Pinyin Syllables" (without marks of tones) of "Xinhua Dictionary" or the "Table of Syllables" (with tones) in "Xiandai Hanyu Cidian".

Chinese characters with exactly the same pinyin expressions, i.e. completely homonymous characters with the same initials, finals and tones, are usually sorted by means of stroke-based sorting.

== Sorting words of multiple characters ==
Words with multiple characters can be sorted in two different ways, character by character or word by word.

=== Character-by-character sorting ===
First, sort the words alphabetically by their first characters. If the first characters are the same, sort by the second characters, and so on. For example,

底層 (dǐcéng), 地標 (dìbiāo), 地表 (dìbiǎo), 地租 (dìzū), 電燈 (diàndēng).

"Xiandai Hanyu Cidian" and "Oxford Chinese Dictionary" use this method.

=== Word-by-word sorting ===
The words are sorted by the pinyin letter strings of the whole words, and then sorted by tone when the letters are the same. To compare to the previous example, the order would be

電燈 (diàndēng), 地標 (dìbiāo), 地表 (dìbiǎo),  底層 (dǐcéng), 地租 (dìzū). 

This method is applied to ABC Chinese-English Dictionary.

== Comments ==
The Chinese character pinyin sorting method adopts the internationally accepted Latin alphabetical order. It is simple and scientific, and represents an ideal method for Chinese information look up. However, it has not yet reached the level of convenience of English alphabetical order. The biggest disadvantage lies in its inability to support look up of characters without knowing their pronunciations (therefore, dictionaries arranged in pinyin order usually have indexes of other sorting methods). In addition, the large number of homophones in Chinese also need to be processed by other sorting methods.
