= Radical 52 =

Chinese character radical

幺
- Radical 52 (U+2F33)
- 幺 (U+5E7A) "short, tiny"

Pronunciations
- Pinyin: yāo
- Bopomofo: ㄧㄠ
- Wade–Giles: yao1
- Cantonese Yale: yiū
- Jyutping: jiu1
- Pe̍h-ōe-jī: iau
- Japanese Kana: ヨウ yō (on'yomi)
- Sino-Korean: 요 yo

Names
- Chinese name(s): 幺字旁 yāozìpáng
- Japanese name(s): 糸頭/いとがしら itogashira
- Hangul: 작을 jageul

Stroke order animation

Radical 52 or radical short thread (幺部) meaning "short" or "tiny" is one of the 31 Kangxi radicals (214 radicals in total) composed of three strokes.

In the Kangxi Dictionary, there are 50 characters (out of 49,030) to be found under this radical.

幺 is also the 59th indexing component in the Table of Indexing Chinese Character Components predominantly adopted by Simplified Chinese dictionaries published in mainland China.

== Evolution ==
Component of 玄 and 糸.

Bronze script character

Small Seal Script character

== Derived characters ==
Strokes	Characters
+0	幺
+1	幻
+2	幼
+6	幽
+9	幾

== Variant forms ==
There is a design nuance in different printing typefaces for this radical. While the character is always written in 3 strokes, in traditional typefaces, the first and the second turning strokes are broken into two respectively to adapt to the carving of movable type systems, and usually there is a gap between the first and the second strokes. Currently, in both Simplified Chinese and Traditional Chinese, the discontinuous turning strokes in standard printing fonts are merged into one to imitate its handwriting form, though the traditional printing form is still widely used in Traditional Chinese publication. The traditional form remains standard in modern Japanese and Korean printing typefaces.

This difference exists only in printing typefaces, not in any handwriting form.

Traditional	Modern Chinese
幺	幺

== Literature ==
- Fazzioli, Edoardo (1987). Chinese calligraphy : from pictograph to ideogram : the history of 214 essential Chinese/Japanese characters. calligraphy by Rebecca Hon Ko. New York: Abbeville Press. ISBN 0-89659-774-1.
- Lunde, Ken (Jan 5, 2009). "Appendix J: Japanese Character Sets" (PDF). CJKV Information Processing: Chinese, Japanese, Korean & Vietnamese Computing (Second ed.). Sebastopol, Calif.: O'Reilly Media. ISBN 978-0-596-51447-1.
