= Chinese character strokes =

Smallest writing units of Chinese characters

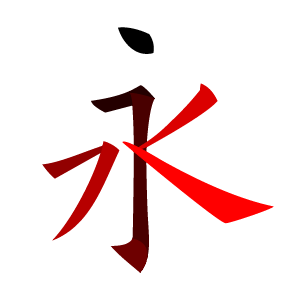
永 'forever' or 'permanence', a Chinese character that represents a variety of strokes, and is often used to demonstrate the major stroke categories

Strokes (simplified Chinese: 笔画; traditional Chinese: 筆畫; pinyin: bǐhuà) are the smallest structural units making up written Chinese characters. In the act of writing, a stroke is defined as a movement of a writing instrument on a writing material surface, or the trace left on the surface from a discrete application of the writing implement. The modern sense of discretized strokes first came into being with the clerical script during the Han dynasty. In the regular script that emerged during the Tang dynasty—the most recent major style, highly studied for its aesthetics in East Asian calligraphy—individual strokes are discrete and highly regularized. By contrast, the ancient seal script has line terminals within characters that are often unclear, making them non-trivial to count.

Study and classification of strokes is useful for understanding Chinese character calligraphy, ensuring character legibility, identifying fundamental components of radicals, and implementing support for the writing system on computers.

== Evolution ==
The terminals of the individual marks in ancient character forms are often unclear, and it is sometimes nontrivial to count them. The modern motion of discretized strokes did not fully emerge until clerical script:

Historical evolution of the character 馬 'horse'
Oracle	Bronze	Seal		Clerical	Regular	
Oracle	Bronze	Large	Small	Clerical	Traditional	Simplified

== Purpose ==
The study and classification of strokes is used for:

1. understanding Chinese character calligraphy – the correct method of writing, shape formation and stroke order required for character legibility;
2. understanding stroke changes according to the style that is in use;
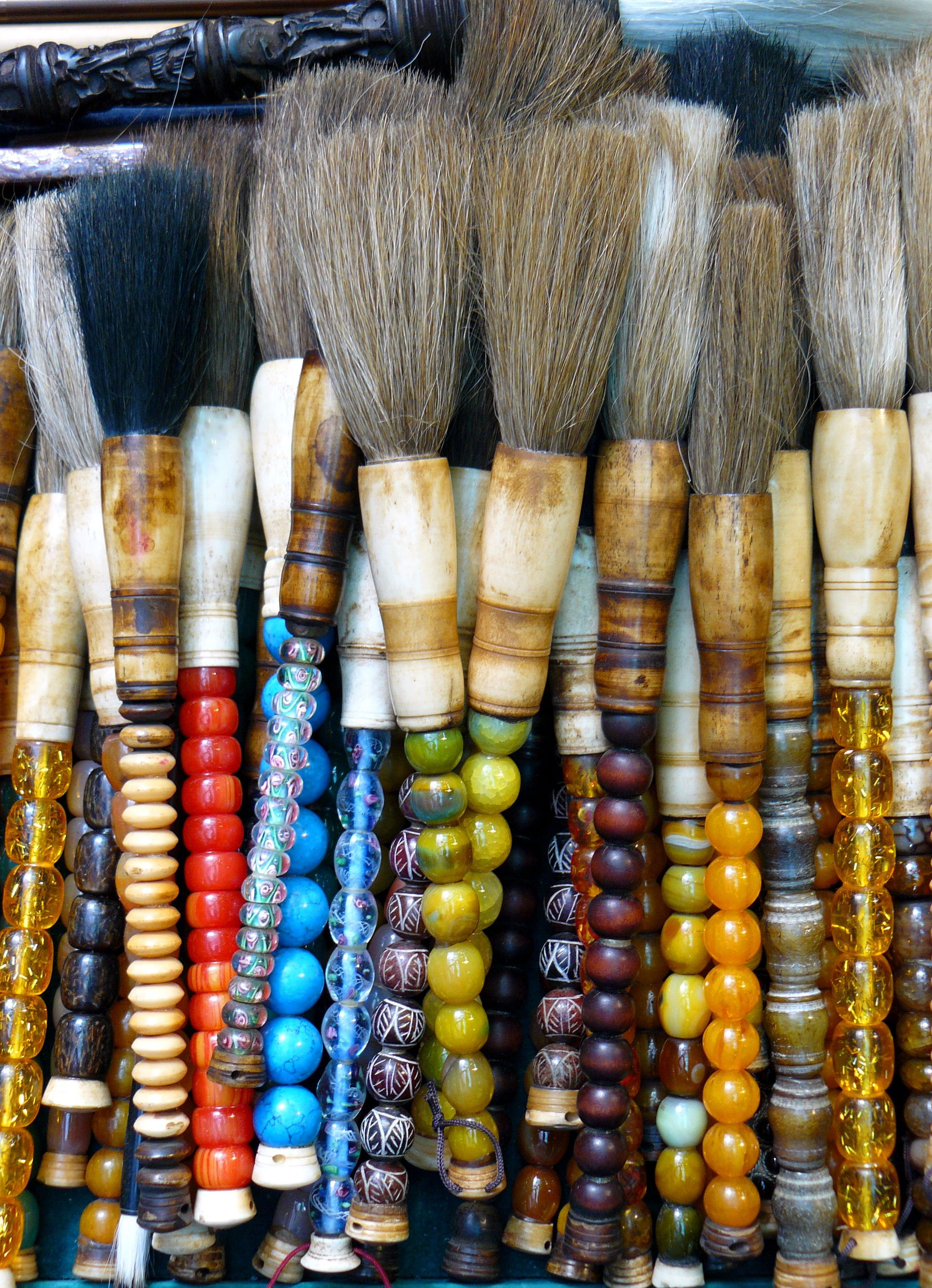
3. Traditional calligraphy brushes which give the strokes their unique shape
  defining stroke naming and counting conventions;
4. identifying fundamental components of Han radicals; and
5. their use in computing.

== Formation ==
When writing Han radicals, a single stroke includes all the motions necessary to produce a given part of a character before lifting the writing instrument from the writing surface; thus, a single stroke may have abrupt changes in direction within the line. For example:

- (Vertical / shù) is classified as a basic stroke because it is a single stroke that forms a line moving in one direction.
- (Vertical – Horizontal – Vertical / shù zhé zhé) is classified as a compound stroke because it is a single stroke that forms a line that includes one or more abrupt changes in direction. This example is a sequence of three basic strokes written without lifting the writing instrument such as the ink brush from the writing surface.

== Direction ==
All strokes have direction. They are unidirectional and start from one entry point. As such, they are usually not written in the reverse direction by native users. Here are some examples:

== Types ==
CJK strokes are an attempt to identify and classify all single-stroke components that can be used to write Han radicals. There are some thirty distinct types of strokes recognized in Chinese characters, some of which are compound strokes made from basic strokes. The compound strokes comprise more than one movement of the writing instrument, and many of these have no agreed-upon name.

=== Basic strokes ===
A basic stroke is a single calligraphic mark moving in one direction across a writing surface. The following table lists a selection of basic strokes divided into two stroke groups: simple and combining. "Simple strokes" (such as Horizontal / Héng and Dot / Diǎn) can be written alone. "Combining strokes" (such as Bend / Zhé and Hook / Gōu) never occur alone, but must be paired with at least one other stroke forming a compound stroke. Thus, they are not in themselves individual strokes.

Table of basic strokes
English	Name in PRC	Name in ROC	Name in Japan	Name in Vietnam	CJK stroke	Meaning of Chinese name (Japanese name, if different)	Additional description
Simple strokes
Dot	Diǎn, 点	Diǎn, 點	Ten, 点	Chấm 枕		"Dot"	Tiny dash, speck.
Horizontal	Héng, 横	Héng, 橫	Yoko, 横	Sổ ngang 𬃈昂		"Horizontal"	Rightward stroke.
Vertical	Shù, 竖	Shù, 豎	Tate, 豎	Sổ dọc 𬃈𫆡		"Vertical"	Downward stroke.
Upward horizontal	Tí, 提	Tiāo, 挑	Hane, 跳	Hất 迄		"Rise" ("Jump")	Flick up and rightwards.
Press	Nà, 捺	Nà, 捺	(Migi) Harai, (右)払	Mác 莫		"Press down" ("(Right) Sweep")	Falling rightwards (fattening at the bottom).
Throw	Piě, 撇	Piě, 撇	(Hidari) Harai, (左)払	Phẩy 𢵪		"Throw away" ("(Left) Sweep")	Falling leftwards (with slight curve).
Combining strokes
Bend	Zhé, 折	Zhé, 折	Ore, 折	Gập 岋		"Bend, fold"	Indicates change in stroke direction, usually 90° turn, going down or going right only.
Hook	Gōu, 钩	Gōu, 鈎(鉤)	Kagi, 鉤	Móc 鈢		"Hook"	Appended to other strokes, suddenly sharp turning before crash stopping.
Clockwise curve	Wān, 弯	Wān, 彎	(Hidari) Sori, (左)反	Cong 𢏣		"Curve"	Tapering curved line, usually concave left (convex outward right).
Anticlockwise curve	Wān, 弯; Xié, 斜	Qū, 曲	(Migi) Sori, (右)反	Nghiêng 迎	㇄;	"(Right) curve"; "Slant"	Curved line, usually concave right (convex outward left).

Note, the basic stroke Diǎn "Dot" is rarely a real dot. Instead it usually takes the shape of a very small line pointing in one of several directions, and may be long enough to be confused with other strokes.

=== Compound strokes ===
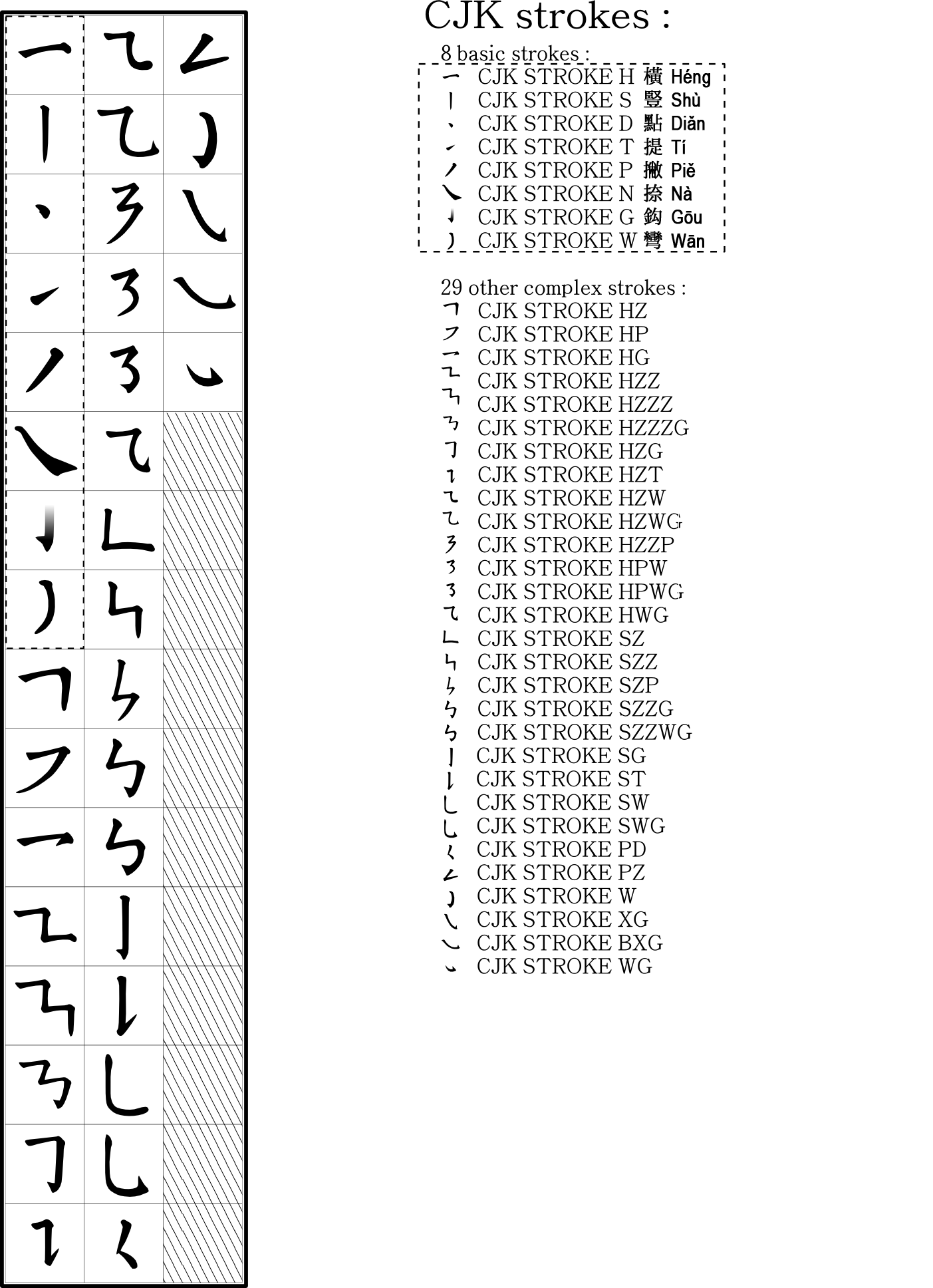
Another classification using 37 strokes: 8 basic strokes, and 29 complex strokes

A compound stroke (also called a complex stroke) is produced when two or more basic strokes are combined in a single stroke written without lifting the writing instrument from the writing surface. The character 永 (pinyin: yǒng) "eternity", described in more detail in § Eight Principles of Yong, demonstrates one of these compound strokes. The centre line is a compound stroke that combines three stroke shapes in a single stroke.

Basics for making compound strokes (Note: The extended CJK(V) set of strokes has 29 strokes. These most common 29 used strokes can be reduced to combinations of 8 basic strokes, for a total of 37 strokes. The subset of 8 is found in the character "eternity" 永, hence the name of this set. But other sets of CJK(V) strokes can be found.)

In most cases, concatenating basic strokes together form a compound stroke. For example, Vertical / Shù combined with Hook / Gōu produce (Vertical–Hook / Shù Gōu). A stroke naming convention sums the names of the basic strokes, in the writing order.

An exception to this applies when a stroke makes a strictly right-angle turn in the Simplified Chinese names. Horizontal (Héng) and Vertical (Shù) strokes are identified only once when they appear as the first stroke of a compound; any single stroke with successive 90° turns down or to the right are indicated by a Bend 折 (pinyin: zhé). For example, an initial Shù followed by an abrupt turn right produces (Shù Zhé). In the same way, an initial Shù followed by an abrupt turn right followed by a second turn down produces (Shù Zhé Zhé). However, their inherited names are "Vertical–Horizontal" and "Vertical–Horizontal–Vertical". We need not to use "Bend" in the inherited names.

Nearly all complex strokes can be named using this scheme.

== Nomenclature ==
Organization systems used to describe and differentiate strokes may include the use of roman letters, Chinese characters, numbers, or a combination of these devices. Two methods of organizing CJK strokes are by:

- Classification schemes that describe strokes by a naming convention or by conformity to a taxonomy; and
- Categorization schemes that differentiate strokes by numeric or topical grouping.

In classification schemes, stroke forms are described, assigned a representative character or letterform, and may be arranged in a hierarchy. In categorization schemes, stroke forms are differentiated, sorted and grouped into like categories; categories may be topical, or assigned by a numeric or alpha-numeric nominal number according to a designed numbering scheme.

=== Pinyin naming convention in Unicode standard ===
A naming convention is a classification scheme where a controlled vocabulary is used systematically to describe the characteristics of an item. The naming convention for a CJK stroke is derived from the path mark left by the writing instrument. In this instance, the first letter of each stroke component - transliterated with pinyin pronunciation - are concatenated to form a stroke name with the sequence of letters indicating the basic strokes or stroke components used to create the CJK stroke. This system is used in the Unicode standard when encoding CJK stroke characters. In a basic stroke example, H represents the stroke named 横 (Héng); in a compound example, HZT represents 横折提 (Héng zhé tí).

While no consensus exists, there are up to 12 distinct basic strokes that are identified by a unique radical.

Letters commonly used in CJK stroke naming conventions (12 items)
Letter	B	D	G	H	N	P	Q	S	T	W	X	Z
Stroke direction												90° turn right or down
Simp./Trad.	扁	点/點	钩/鈎(鉤)	横/橫	捺	撇	圈	竖/豎	提	弯/彎	斜	折
Pinyin	Biǎn	Diǎn	Gōu	Héng	Nà	Piě	Quān	Shù	Tí	Wān	Xié	Zhé
Meaning	"Flat"	"Dot"	"Hook"	"Horizontal"	"Right-falling"	"Left-falling"	"Circle"	"Vertical"	"Rising"	"Curved"	"Slant"	"Bent"

There are many CJK compound strokes, however there is no consensus for sequence letter naming of compound strokes using the basic strokes. The following table demonstrates one of the CJK stroke naming convention:

Selected named CJK basic and compound strokes
Stroke	Name in PRC	Abbr	Full Name	Dictionary meaning and Note	Example characters	Encoding
	横	H	Héng	一 yī, "cardinal number one", "alone" (Radical 1 一).	二 三 丁 丞 丈 世 不 上 十 卅 七	U+31D0 (㇐)
	提	T	Tí		冰 淋 病 孑 治 冶 冽 暴 氾 录 地 虫	U+31C0 (㇀)
	横钩	HG	Héng Gōu	乛 wān, ya, zhé (折) turning stroke / to break (Radical: Variant form of 乙 yǐ).	疋 了 危 予 矛 子 字 令 疏 写 冖	U+31D6 (㇖)
	横撇	HP	Héng Piě		又 水 夕 径 炙 双 叒 今	U+31C7 (㇇)
	横折	HZ	Héng Zhé		口 囗 己 田 品 吕 申 甲 圆 巪	U+31D5 (㇕)
	横折钩	HZG	Héng Zhé Gōu	(Radical: Variant form of 乙 yǐ).	羽 习 包 勻 葡 用 青 甫 勺 月 也 乜	U+31C6 (㇆)
	横折提	HZT	Héng Zhé Tí		讠 计 鳩	U+31CA (㇊)
	横折折	HZZ	Héng Zhé Zhé		凹	U+31C5 (㇅)
	横折弯	HZW	Héng Zhé Wān		殳 投 朵	U+31CD (㇍)
	横折弯钩	HZWG	Héng Zhé Wān Gōu	Unofficial name "HWG" is used by Hugo Lopez to refer to both HZWG and HXG.	九 几 丸 杂	U+31C8 (㇈)
	横斜钩	HXG	Héng Xié Gōu	This stroke was merged into stroke HZWG in Unicode., but later disunified.	飞 风 瘋 凬 虱 迅 气	U+31E4 (㇤)
	横斜弯钩 (横折弯钩)	HXWG (HZWG)	Héng Xié Wān Gōu (Héng Zhé Wān Gōu)	乙 yǐ, niè, "the second of the ten heavenly stems", "second"; zhé (折) turning stroke / to break (Radical 5 乙).	氹 乞 乤 艺	U+31E0 (㇠)
	横折折折	HZZZ	Héng Zhé Zhé Zhé		凸	U+31CE (㇎)
	横折折撇	HZZP	Héng Zhé Zhé Piě		建 及	U+31CB (㇋)
	横撇弯钩	HPWG	Héng Piě Wān Gōu		阝 队 邮	U+31CC (㇌)
	横折折折钩	HZZZG	Héng Zhé Zhé Zhé Gōu	𠄎 nǎi, archaic form of 乃 "then", "really, indeed", "namely", "you, your".	乃 孕 仍	U+31E1 (㇡)
	竖	S	Shù	丨 gě, gǔn, "vertical line" (Radical 2 丨).	丩 中 串 讧 乍 上 五 丑	U+31D1 (㇑)
	竖钩	SG	Shù Gōu	亅 jué, "a vertical line with a hook" (Radical 6 亅).	爭 事 求 水	U+31DA (㇚)
	竖提	ST	Shù Tí		以 比 切 卯 食 良 艮 很 狠 鄉 民	U+31D9 (㇙)
	竖折	SZ	Shù Zhé		断 陋 继 山 互 彙 牙 乐 东	U+31D7 (㇗)
	竖弯	SW	Shù Wān		區 亡 妄 四	U+31C4 (㇄)
	竖弯左	SWZ	Shù Wān Zuǒ		肅 嘯 蕭 簫	U+31D8 (㇘)
	竖弯钩	SWG	Shù Wān Gōu	乚 yǐn, "hidden", "mysterious", "small", usually read as 隱 / 隐 yǐn (Radical: Variant form of 乙 yǐ).	乱 己 已 巳	U+31DF (㇟)
	竖折折	SZZ	Shù Zhé Zhé		亞 鼎 卐 吳	U+31DE (㇞)
	竖折撇	SZP	Shù Zhé Piě	This stroke was merged into stroke SZZ in Unicode., but later disunified.	专 𧦮 𤓷 𤦡	U+31E5 (㇥)
	竖折弯钩 (竖折折钩)	SZWG (SZZG)	Shù Zhé Wān Gōu (Shù Zhé Zhé Gōu)		亏 强 弓 丏 丐 与 马 鸟 丂 号	U+31C9 (㇉)
	撇	P	Piě	丿 usually read as 撇 piě, "line", "slash" (Radical 4 丿).	乂 爻 禾 毛 乏 乖 釆 衣 八 行	U+31D2 (㇒)
	竖撇	SP	Shù Piě		乃 月 用 齊 几 人 班 大	U+31D3 (㇓)
(Note: Pipa)	撇钩	PG	Piě Gōu		乄	U+31E2 (㇢)
	撇折	PZ	Piě Zhé		弘 玄 公 厶 翁	U+31DC (㇜)
	撇点	PD	Piě Diǎn	𡿨 quǎn, a little drain between fields, usually read as 畎 quǎn (Radical 47 巛).	女 巛 巡 獵 災 甾	U+31DB (㇛)
	点	D	Diǎn	丶 zhǔ, "dot", usually read as 點 / 点 diǎn (Radical 3 丶).	丸 叉 义 永 冰 凡 丹 主 求 火 刃	U+31D4 (㇔)
	捺	N	Nà	㇏ usually read as 捺 nà.	大 人 天 入 走 边 廷 尺	U+31CF (㇏)
	提捺	TN	Tí Nà	(1) 乀 fú, "stretch". (2) 乁 yí, "to move" (archaic).	尐 之 道 八 入 廻	U+31DD (㇝)
	斜钩	XG	Xié Gōu		戈 弋 戰 我	U+31C2 (㇂)
	扁斜钩	BXG	Biǎn Xié Gōu		心 必 沁 惢 蕊	U+31C3 (㇃)
	弯钩	WG	Wān Gōu		狐 狱 豹 家 啄 嶽 貓 家 逐	U+31C1 (㇁)
(Note: Kolo)	圈	Q	Quān	〇 líng, "zero"; also read as 圈 quān, "circle". Rare.	〇 㔔 㪳 㫈	U+31E3 (㇣)

Besides, some strokes have been unified or abandoned in Unicode:

CJK basic and compound strokes which have been unified or abandoned
Stroke	Name in PRC	Abbr	Full Name	Note	Example characters
	横撇弯	HPW	Héng Piě Wān	It only appears in Regular script, can be merged into stroke HPHP in Song typeface.	辶 过 边
	竖折折弯钩	SZZWG	Shù Zhé Zhé Wān Gōu	This stroke has been merged into stroke SZZG in Unicode.	弓 丐
	弯	W	Wān	It never occurs alone, only appears inside compound strokes.	辶 豕 𢀓
	弯钩	WG	Wān Gōu	It never occurs alone, only appears inside compound strokes.	乙
	点捺	DN	Diǎn Nà	This stroke has been merged into stroke N in Unicode.	內 全 廴
	平捺	PN	Píng Nà	This stroke has been merged into stroke N in Unicode.	是 走 廴
	提平捺	TPN	Tí Píng Nà	This stroke has been merged into stroke TN in Unicode.	辶 之 辷

Note that some names in the list do not follow the rules of controlled vocabulary. For example, stroke P (Piě) is not found in the compound stroke PN. The name "PN" comes from 平捺 (pinyin: Píng Nà), not 撇捺 (pinyin: Piě Nà). The meaning of 平 (pinyin: Píng) is "flat", and it should be called "BN" 扁捺 (pinyin: Biǎn Nà) if the rules are to be followed closely. The letter "Z" in stroke SWZ means 左 (pinyin: Zuǒ), not 折 (pinyin: Zhé). The meaning of 左 is "left", and it is not defined in the naming convention. Moreover, some 折 (pinyin: Zhé) strokes are far more than or far less than 90°, such as stroke HZZZG, stroke HZZP and stroke PZ.

Some strokes are not included in the Unicode standard, such as,,,,,, etc.

In Simplified Chinese, stroke TN is usually written as (It was called "stroke DN", but Unicode has rejected it).

=== English abbreviated naming conventions ===
There is another naming convention that use abbreviated forms of the English names for CJK strokes. The first letter of the English names are used in the naming system. The controlled vocabulary can be divided into two groups.

The first group is the abbreviated forms of the basic strokes.

Abbreviation form of the basic strokes (10 items)
Abbr form	H	V	T	P	D	U	C	A	J	O
Shape of stroke										
English name	Horizontal	Vertical	Throw	Press	Dot	Upward horizontal	Clockwise curve	Anticlockwise curve	J hook	Oval
Chinese name	橫	豎	撇	捺	點	挑	彎	曲	鈎	圈

The second group is the abbreviated forms of deformations used to form compound strokes.

Abbreviation form of the deformations (10 items)
Abbr form	F	W	S	L	R	E	N	I	M	Z
Deformation										
English name	Flat	Wilted	Slanted	Left	Right	Extended	Narrowed	Inverted	Mirrored	Zag
Chinese name	扁	直	斜	左	右	長	短	倒	反	折

“Zag” can be omitted in the naming system. The following table demonstrates the English abbreviation naming convention:

Inherited names of CJK basic and compound strokes (63 items)
Stroke		Chinese name	Abbr form	Full name	Name in Unicode	Example
Ming	Kai	Chinese name	Abbr form	Full name	Name in Unicode	Example
		橫	H	Horizontal	H	三 言 隹 花
		斜橫	SH	Slanted Horizontal	(H)	七 弋 宅 戈
		挑	U	Upward horizontal	T	刁 求 虫 地
		點挑	DU	Dot – Upward horizontal	(T)	冰 冷 汗 汁
		豎	V	Vertical	S	十 圭 川 仆
		斜豎	SV	Slanted Vertical	(S)	丑 五 亙 貫
		右斜豎	RSV	Right Slanted Vertical	(S)	𠙴
		撇	T	Throw	P	竹 大 乂 勿
		扁撇	FT	Flat Throw	(P)	千 乏 禾 斤
		直撇	WT	Wilted Throw	SP	九 厄 月 几
		點	D	Dot	D	主 卜 夕 凡
		長點	ED	Extended Dot	(D)	囪 囟 这 凶
		左點	LD	Left Dot	(D)	心 忙 恭 烹
		直點	WD	Wilted Dot	(D)	六 文 宇 空
		捺	P	Press	N	人 木 尺 冬
		挑捺	UP	Upward horizontal – Press	TN	文 廴 父 爻
		橫捺	HP	Horizontal – Press	(TN)	入 八 內 全
		扁捺	FP	Flat Press	(N)	走 足 廴 麵
		挑扁捺	UFP	Upward horizontal – Flat Press	(TN)	之 乏 巡 迴
		彎	C	Clockwise curve	W	
		曲	A	Anticlockwise curve	X	
		圈	O	Oval	Q	〇 㔔 㪳 㫈
		橫鈎	HJ	Horizontal – J hook	HG	冧 欠 冝 蛋
		挑鈎	UJ	Upward horizontal – J hook	(HG)	也 乜 池 馳
		橫撇	HT	Horizontal – Throw	HP	夕 水 登 令
		橫斜	HSV	Horizontal – Slanted Vertical	(HP)	今 彔 互 恆
		橫豎	HV	Horizontal – Vertical	HZ	口 己 臼 典
		橫豎鈎	HVJ	Horizontal – Vertical – J hook	HZG	而 永 印 令
		橫撇鈎	HTJ	Horizontal – Throw – J hook	(HZG)	勺 方 力 母
		挑撇鈎	UTJ	Upward horizontal – Throw – J hook	(HZG)	也 乜 池 馳
		橫豎橫	HVH	Horizontal – Vertical – Horizontal	HZZ	凹 兕 卍 雋
		橫豎挑	HVU	Horizontal – Vertical – Upward horizontal	HZT	殼 鸠 说 计
		橫曲	HA	Horizontal – Anticlockwise curve	HZW	朵 沿 殳 没
		橫曲鈎	HAJ	Horizontal – Anticlockwise curve – J hook	HZWG	九 几 凡 亢
		橫捺鈎	HPJ	Horizontal – Press – J hook	(HZWG)	風 迅 飛 凰
		橫撇曲鈎	HTAJ	Horizontal – Throw – Anticlockwise curve – J hook	HXWG	乙 氹 乞 乭
		橫撇彎	HTC	Horizontal – Throw – Clockwise curve	---	過 过 這 这
		橫撇橫撇	HTHT	Horizontal – Throw – Horizontal – Throw	HZZP	延 建 巡 及
		橫撇彎鈎	HTCJ	Horizontal – Throw – Clockwise curve – J hook	HPWG	陳 陌 那 耶
		橫豎橫豎	HVHV	Horizontal – Vertical – Horizontal – Vertical	HZZZ	凸 𡸭 𠱂 𢫋
		橫撇橫撇鈎	HTHTJ	Horizontal – Throw – Horizontal – Throw – J hook	HZZZG	乃 孕 仍 盈
		豎挑	VU	Vertical – Upward horizontal	ST	卬 氏 衣 比
		豎橫	VH	Vertical – Horizontal	SZ	山 世 匡 直
		豎曲	VA	Vertical – Anticlockwise curve	SW	區 亡 四 匹
		豎曲鈎	VAJ	Vertical – Anticlockwise curve – J hook	SWG	孔 已 亂 也
		豎橫豎	VHV	Vertical – Horizontal – Vertical	SZZ	鼎 亞 吳 卐
		豎橫撇	VHT	Vertical – Horizontal – Throw	(SZZ)	奊 捑 𠱐 𧦮
		豎橫撇鈎	VHTJ	Vertical – Horizontal – Throw – J hook	SZWG	弓 弟 丐 弱
		豎鈎	VJ	Vertical – J hook	SG	小 水 到 寸
		豎彎	VC	Vertical – Clockwise curve	SWZ	肅 嘯 蕭 瀟
		豎彎鈎	VCJ	Vertical – Clockwise curve – J hook	---	𨙨 𨛜 𨞠 𨞰
		撇挑	TU	Throw – Upward horizontal	PZ	去 公 玄 鄉
		撇橫	TH	Throw – Horizontal	(SZ)	互 母 牙 车
		撇點	TD	Throw – Dot	PD	巡 兪 巢 粼
		直撇點	WTD	Wilted Throw – Dot	(PD)	女 如 姦 㜢
		撇橫撇	THT	Throw – Horizontal – Throw	(SZZ)	夨 𠨮 专 砖
		撇橫撇鈎	THTJ	Throw – Horizontal – Throw – J hook	(SZWG)	巧 亟 污 號
		撇鈎	TJ	Throw – J hook	PG	乄
		彎鈎	CJ	Clockwise curve – J hook	WG	狗 豸 豕 象
		扁捺鈎	FPJ	Flat Press – J hook	BXG	心 必 沁 厯
		捺鈎	PJ	Press – J hook	XG	弋 戈 我 銭
		撇橫撇曲鈎	THTAJ	Throw – Horizontal – Throw – Anticlockwise curve – J hook	---	𠃉 𦲳 𦴱 鳦
		撇圈點	TOD	Throw – Oval – Dot	---	𡧑 𡆢

=== Numbering scheme ===
A numbering scheme is a categorisation method where similar strokes are grouped into categories labeled by nominal numbers. Category numbering may be an index of numbers of types, with sub-types indicated by a decimal point followed by another number or a letter.

The following table is a common numbering scheme that uses similar names as the Roman letter naming convention, but the stroke forms are grouped into major category types (1 to 5), which further break down into 25 sub-types in category 5.

Example of a CJK stroke numbering scheme (34 items)

Type	No.	Stroke	Name (simplified Chinese and pinyin)
Horizontal (一)
1	1		横 Héng
1	1.1		提 Tí
Vertical (丨)
2	2		竖 Shù
2	2.1		竖钩 Shù Gōu
Slash (丿)
3	3		撇 Piě
Dot (丶)
4	4		点 Diǎn
4	4.1		捺 Nà
4	4.2		提捺 Tí Nà

Type	No.	Stroke	Name (simplified Chinese and pinyin)	
Turning stroke (折 Zhé = right angle turn) or (弯 Wān = curve turn)
5	5.1		横折 Héng Zhé	
5	5.2		横撇 Héng Piě	
5	5.3		横钩 Héng Gōu	
5	5.4		竖折 Shù Zhé	
5	5.5		竖弯 Shù Wān	
5	5.6		竖提 Shù Tí	
5	5.7		撇折 Piě Zhé	
5	5.8		撇点 Piě Diǎn	
5	5.9		卧钩 Wō Gōu	
5	5.10		弯钩 Wān Gōu	
5	5.11		斜钩 Xié Gōu	
5	5.12		横折折 Héng Zhé Zhé	
5	5.13		横折弯 Héng Zhé Wān	
5	5.14		横折提 Héng Zhé Tí	
5	5.15		横折钩 Héng Zhé Gōu	
5	5.16		横斜钩 Héng Xié Gōu	
5	5.17		竖折折 Shù Zhé Zhé	
5	5.18		竖折撇 Shù Zhé Piě	
5	5.19		竖弯钩 Shù Wān Gōu	
5	5.20		横折折折 Héng Zhé Zhé Zhé	
5	5.21		横折折撇 Héng Zhé Zhé Piě	
5	5.22		横折弯钩 Héng Zhé Wān Gōu	
5	5.22	5.22.1		横斜弯钩 Héng Xié Wān Gōu
5	5.23		横撇弯钩 Héng Piě Wān Gōu	
5	5.24		竖折折钩 Shù Zhé Zhé Gōu	
5	5.25		横折折折钩 Héng Zhé Zhé Zhé Gōu	

Some strokes are not included in the numbering scheme, such as stroke,,,,,,,, etc.

Besides, there are ways of grouping strokes that are different from the Unicode standard. For example, stroke is merged into stroke in Unicode system, while it is merged into in this numbering scheme.

== Number of strokes ==
Stroke number or stroke count is the number of strokes making up a character. Stroke count plays an important role in Chinese character sorting, teaching and computer information processing. Stroke numbers vary dramatically from characters to characters, for example, characters 丶, 一 and 乙 have only one stroke, while the character 齉 has 36 strokes, and 龘 (a composition of 龍 in triplicate) has 48. The Chinese character with the most strokes in the entire Unicode character set is "taito" 𱁬 with 84 strokes.

=== Counting strokes ===
There are effective methods to count the strokes of a Chinese character correctly. First of all, stroke counting is to be carried out on the standard regular script form of the character, and according to its stroke order. And if needed, a standard list of strokes or list of stroke orders issued by the authoritative institution should be consulted.

If two strokes are connected at the endpoints, whether they are separated into two strokes or linked into one stroke can be judged by the following rules:

1. If the two strokes are connected in the upper left corner of a character or component, then separate them into two strokes.
  Examples: 厂 (stroke order: ㇐㇓), 口 (㇑㇕㇐) and 日 (㇑㇕㇐㇐).
2. If they are connected in the upper right corner, then one stroke.
  Examples: 口 (㇑㇕㇐), 月 (㇓㇆㇐㇐), 句 (㇓㇆㇑㇕㇐).
3. If they are connected in the lower left corner, then if it is a fully enclosed structure, then count as two separated strokes
  Examples: 口 (㇑㇕㇐), 回 (㇑㇕㇑㇕㇐㇐), 田 (㇑㇕㇐㇑㇐)
  - Exceptions: 惯, 實, 母, 马, 鸟, 乌
4. If it is not fully enclosed, then count as one stroke.
  Examples: 山 (㇑㇗㇑), 区 (㇐㇓㇔㇗), 葛 (㇐㇑㇑㇑㇕㇐㇐㇓㇆㇓㇔㇗) .
  - Exceptions: 馬; 巨(Taiwan: 12511；Mainland：1515)
5. If they are connected in the lower right corner, then two strokes.
  Examples: 口 (㇑㇕㇐), 回 (㇑㇕㇑㇕㇐㇐), 田 (㇑㇕㇐㇑㇐).

An important prerequisite for connecting two strokes into one stroke is: the tail of the first stroke is connected with the head of the second stroke.

=== Distribution of characters ===
Chart of Standard Forms of Common National Characters is a standard character set of 4,808 characters issued by Taiwan's Ministry of Education. The stroke numbers of characters range from 1 to 32 strokes. The 11-stroke group has the most characters, taking 9.297% of the character set. On the average, there are 12.186 strokes per character.

The List of Frequently Used Characters in Modern Chinese (现代汉语常用字表) is a standard character set of 3,500 characters issued by the Ministry of Education of the People's Republic of China. The stroke numbers of characters range from 1 to 24 strokes. The 9-strokes characters are the most, taking 11.857% of the character set. On the average, there are 9.7409 strokes per character.

The Unicode Basic CJK Unified Ideographs is an international standard character set issued by ISO and Unicode, the same character set of the China national standard 13000.1. There are 20,902 Chinese characters, including simplified and traditional characters from China, Japan and Korea (CJK). The stroke numbers of characters range from 1 to 48 strokes. The 12-strokes group has the most characters, taking 9.358% of the character set. On the average, there are 12.845 strokes per character.

== Stroke form ==
Stroke forms (笔形; 筆形; bǐxíng) are the shapes of strokes. Different classification schemes have different numbers of categories by which one may classify individual strokes.

=== Two categories ===
The strokes of modern Chinese characters can be divided into plane strokes (平笔) and turning or bent strokes (折笔) .

- Plane or basic strokes move in only one direction, or only curve gently—usually less than 90 degrees.

Examples: heng (横, ㇐), ti (提, ㇀), shu (竖, ㇑), pie (撇, ㇓), dian (点, ㇔), na (捺, ㇏)

- Bent strokes are composed of plane strokes and turning points with sharper bends. Bent strokes also called derived strokes (派生笔形) or compound strokes (复合笔形).

Examples: ㇕ ㇅ ㇎ ㇡ ㇋ ㇊ ㇍ ㇈ 乙 ㇆ ㇇ ㇌ ㇗ ㇞ ㇉ ㄣ ㇙ ㇄ ㇟ ㇚ ㇜ ㇛ ㇃ ㇂.

=== Five categories ===
When the six plane strokes of “heng (横, ㇐), ti (提, ㇀), shu (竖, ㇑), pie (撇, ㇓), dian (点, ㇔), na (捺, ㇏)” are classified into four categories by putting "ti" into category heng, and na into dian, then together with the bent stroke category, a five-category system is formed:

1. heng (横, ㇐), ti (提, ㇀).
2. shu (竖, ㇑).
3. pie (撇, ㇓).
4. dian (点, ㇔), na (捺, ㇏).
5. Bent strokes: ㇕ ㇅ ㇎ ㇡ ㇋ ㇊ ㇍ ㇈ 乙 ㇆ ㇇ ㇌ 乁 ⺄ ㇗ ㇞ ㇉ ㄣ ㇙ ㇄ ㇟ ㇚ ㇜ ㇛ ㇃ ㇂.

Current national standards of PRC such as Stroke Orders of Commonly-used Standard Chinese Characters and many reference works published in China adopt the five categories of strokes, and stipulate the heng–shu–pie–dian–zhe (横竖撇点折) stroke-group order. This order is consistent with the stroke order of the character 札 (zhá): ㇐㇑㇓㇔㇟, and as such is called the "札 order". In Hong Kong and Taiwan among other places, people also use the group order of dian–heng–shu–pie–zhe (點橫豎撇折)

The five basic strokes of heng (一), shu (丨), pie (丿), dian (丶), and zhe (𠃍) at the beginning of each group are called main stroke shapes; and the following strokes are called subordinate stroke shapes, or secondary strokes. The name of a category is the name of the main stroke. For example, category heng include main stroke heng and secondary stroke ti.

There are disputes over the classification of the vertical hook stroke (亅) among the five types of strokes. In the currently effective national standards, 亅 belongs to category shu, but some language scholars argue that it should be put in the zhe ('bend') category.

=== Eight categories ===
In this classification, a new category gou (钩 'hook'), which include all the strokes with hooks, is divided out from the original bend category; then, together with the six types of plane strokes, an eight-category system is formed:

1. heng (横): ㇐
2. ti (提): ㇀
3. shu (竖): ㇑
4. pie (撇): ㇓
5. dian (点): ㇔
6. na (捺): ㇏
7. zhe (折 'bend'): ㇕ ㇅ ㇎ ㇋ ㇊ ㇍ ㇇ ㇗ ㇞ ㄣ ㇙ ㇄ ㇜ ㇛
8. gou (钩, 'hook'): ㇡ ㇈ 乙 ㇆ ㇌ ㇤ ㇉ ㇟ ㇚ ㇃ ㇂

Because the character 永 (yǒng; 'forever') happens to contain strokes similar to each of these eight types, this classification is also called the Eight Principles of Yong.

=== CJK strokes ===
The stroke forms of a standard Chinese character set can be classified into a more detailed stroke table (or stroke list), for instance, the Unicode CJK strokes list has 36 types of stroke:

CJK Strokes^{[1]}^{[2]} Official Unicode Consortium code chart (PDF)
	0	1	2	3	4	5	6	7	8	9	A	B	C	D	E	F
U+31Cx	㇀	㇁	㇂	㇃	㇄	㇅	㇆	㇇	㇈	㇉	㇊	㇋	㇌	㇍	㇎	㇏
U+31Dx	㇐	㇑	㇒	㇓	㇔	㇕	㇖	㇗	㇘	㇙	㇚	㇛	㇜	㇝	㇞	㇟
U+31Ex	㇠	㇡	㇢	㇣	㇤	㇥										㇯
Notes 1.As of Unicode version 17.0 2.Grey areas indicate non-assigned code points

A stroke table is also called a stroke alphabet, whose function in the Chinese writing system is akin to the Latin alphabet for the English writing system.

=== YES strokes ===
Another stroke table is the YES Stroke Alphabet, which is used in YES stroke alphabetical order. (Note: Arial,Calibri,Comic Sans,Courier New,EB Garamond,Georgia,Helvetica,Impact,Montserrat,Nunito,Palatino,Roboto,Segoe UI,Tahoma,Times NEW Roman,Trebuchet,Verdana pushes,, Cambria not pushes)

==== Stroke alphabet ====
This is a list of 30 strokes:

㇐ ㇕ ㇅ ㇎ ㇡ ㇋ ㇊ ㇍ ㇈ 乙 ㇆ ㇇ ㇌ ⺄ ㇀ ㇑ ㇗ ㇞ ㇉ ㄣ ㇙ ㇄ ㇟ ㇚ ㇓ ㇜ ㇛ ㇃ ㇔ ㇏ ㇂

The stroke alphabet is built on the basis of Unicode CJK Strokes and the Standard of Chinese Character Bending Strokes of the GB13000.1 Character Set. There are totally 30 strokes, sorted by the standard plane strokes order of heng (横; 橫, 一), tiao, ti (提; 挑, ㇀), shu (豎, 丨), pie (撇, 丿), dian (点; 點, 丶), na (捺, ㇏) and the bending points order of zhe (折), wan (弯; 彎) and gou (钩; 鉤).

==== Names ====
The English name is formed by the initial Pinyin letters of each character in the Chinese name, similar to the naming of CJK strokes in Unicode, (i.e., H: heng, T: ti/tiao, S: shu, P: pie, D: dian, N: na; z: zhe, w: wan and g: gou).

YES stroke names
Stroke	English name	Chinese name	Example (Note: according to the stroke orders in Standard of GB13000.1 Character Set Chinese Character Order (Stroke-Based Order))
㇐	H	横	First stroke of 十; First stroke of 七
㇕	HzS	横折竖	• Second stroke of 口 • First stroke of 敢
㇅	HzSzH	横折竖折横	• Second stroke of 凹
㇎	HzSzHzS	横折竖折横折竖	• Fourth stroke of 凸
㇡	HzSzHzSg	横折竖折横折竖钩	• First stroke of 乃 • Fifth stroke of 杨
㇋	HzSzHzP	横折竖折横折撇	• Second stroke of 及 • Fifth stroke of 延
㇊	HzSzT	横折竖折提	• Second stroke of 计 • Second stroke of 鸠鳩
㇍	HzSwH	横折竖弯横	• Second stroke of 朵 • Fifth stroke of 投
㇈(乙)	HzSwHg	横折竖弯横钩	• Second stroke of 几 • Last stroke of 亿
㇆	HzSg	横折竖钩	• Second stroke of 同 • First stroke of 也
㇇(乛)	HzP	横折撇	• First stroke of 又 • Third stroke of 寳
㇌	HzPzPg	横折撇折撇钩	• First stroke of 陽 • Ninth stroke of 部
	HzNg	横折捺钩	• First stroke of 飞 • Second stroke of 风
㇀	T	提	• Third stroke of 提 • Third stroke of 堆 • Third stroke of 江
㇑	S	竖	• Second stroke of 十 • Second stroke of 五
㇗(㇜)	SzH	竖折横	• Second stroke of 山 • Second stroke of 车
㇞	SzHzS	竖折横折竖	• First stroke of 鼎 • Fourth stroke of 吳
㇉	SzHzSg	竖折横折竖钩	• Second stroke of 马 • Third stroke of 弓
ㄣ	SzHzP	竖折横折撇	• Third stroke of 专 • Seventh stroke of 奊
㇙	SzT	竖折提	• Third stroke of 长 • First stroke of 以
㇄	SwH	竖弯横	• Fourth stroke of 四 • Fifth stroke of 西
㇟	SwHg	竖弯横钩	• Third stroke of 己 • Last stroke of 电 • Second stroke of 心
㇚	Sg	竖钩	• First stroke of 小 • Second stroke of 了
㇓	P	撇	• First stroke of 千 • First stroke of 人 • First stroke of 儿
㇜	PzT	撇折提	• Sixth stroke of 私 • First and second strokes of 红
㇛	PzD	撇折点	• First stroke of 女 • First, Second and third strokes of 巡
㇢	Pg	撇钩	• Second stroke of 犹 • First stroke of 乄
㇔	D	点	• First and second strokes of 河 • First and second strokes of 家
㇏(〇)	N	捺	• Second stroke of 人 • Last stroke of 边 • 〇, Last stroke of 㔔
㇂(㇃)	Ng	捺钩	• Second stroke of 戈 • Fourth stroke of 成 • Second stroke of 心 in Regular font

For more on stroke forms, stroke naming and stroke tables, please visit the previous sections.

== Stroke order ==
The term stroke order can refer to one of two concepts:

- The direction in which a stroke is written—for example, the heng (㇐; 'horizontal') stroke is made horizontally from left to right, while the shu (㇑; 'vertical') stroke is written vertically from top to bottom.
- The order in which strokes are written one by one to form a Chinese character.

Because the direction of strokes is relatively simple, people generally refer to the latter meaning when talking about stroke order.

Certain stroke orders guidelines are recommended to ensure speed, accuracy, and legibility in composition, as most Chinese characters have many strokes. As such, teachers enforce exactly one stroke order for each character, marking every deviation as a mistake, so everyone writes these characters the same way. The stroke order follows a few simple rules, though, which aids in memorizing these. To write CJK characters, one must know how to write CJK strokes, and thus, needs to identify the basic strokes that make up a character.

The most basic rules of stroke order are:

1. Heng (㇐), then shu (㇑)
  - Examples: 十、卄
2. Pie (丿), then na (㇏)
  - Examples: 乂、文
3. Up, then down
  - Examples: 三、旦
4. Left, then right
  - Examples: 川、好
5. Outside, then inside
  - Examples: 同、廣、司

The stroke orders of 笔; 筆 and 顺; 順 are

筆：㇓㇐㇔㇓㇐㇔㇕㇐㇐㇐㇐㇑
笔：㇓㇐㇔㇓㇐㇔㇓㇐㇐㇟
順：㇓㇑㇑㇐㇓㇑㇕㇐㇐㇐㇓㇔
顺：㇓㇑㇑㇐㇓㇑㇕㇓㇔

The order of strokes is a summary of people's experience in writing Chinese characters correctly and conveniently. It plays an important role in the teaching, sorting and computer information processing of Chinese characters. The stroke order of cursive script (草書) is quite flexible and changeable, so the standard of stroke order generally refers to the stroke order of regular script (楷書).

The current stroke order standards are

- China's Stroke Orders of the Commonly-used Standard Chinese Characters (通用规范汉字笔顺规范), and
- Taiwan's Handbook of the Stroke Orders of the Commonly-used National Chinese Characters (常用國字標準字體筆順手册).

== Character sorting ==
Chinese characters can be sorted into different orders by their strokes. Stroke-based sorting methods include Stroke-count sorting, Stroke-order sorting, Stroke-count-stroke-order sorting, and YES sorting.

=== Stroke-count sorting ===
Characters may be sorted by their number of strokes. For example, the different characters in 汉字笔画、漢字筆劃 are sorted into:

- 汉 (5)
- 字 (6)
- 画 (8)
- 笔 (10)
- 筆、畫 (12)
- 漢 (14)

=== Stroke-order sorting ===
The characters are firstly arranged by their first strokes according to an order of stroke groups—such as

1. heng (横)
2. shu (竖)
3. pie (撇)
4. dian (点)
5. zhe (折)

or

1. dian (点)
2. heng (横)
3. shu (竖)
4. pie (撇)
5. zhe (折)

then the characters with first strokes belonging to the same group, if any, are sorted by their second strokes in a similar way, and so on. This method is usually employed to support stroke-count sorting to deal with characters of the same stroke number. For instance, 筆 (12) starts with stroke ㇓ of the pie (撇) group, and 畫 (12) starts with ㇕ of the zhe (折) group, and pie is before zhe in groups order, so 筆 goes before 畫.

=== Stroke–count–stroke–order sorting ===
This is a combination of the previous two methods. In China, stroke-based sorting normally refers to stroke–count–stroke–order sorting. The Chinese national standard stroke-based sorting is in fact an enhanced stroke-count-stroke-order method Characters are arranged by stroke count, followed by stroke order. For example, the different characters in 汉字笔画、漢字筆劃 are sorted into

- 汉 (5)
- 字 (6)
- 画 (8)
- 笔 (10)
- 筆 (12)
- 畫 (12)
- 漢 (14)

where each character is put at a unique position.

=== YES sorting ===
YES is a simplified stroke-based sorting method free of stroke counting and grouping, but without comprising accuracy. It has been used successfully to index the characters in the Xinhua Zidian and Xiandai Hanyu Cidian.

== Stroke combination ==
There are three types of combinations between two strokes (笔划组合; 筆劃組合; bǐhuà zǔhé):

1. Separation: the strokes are separated from each other. Such as: 八, 三, 小.
2. Connection: the strokes are connected, this type can be further divided into two categories:
  1. The end point of one stroke is connected with the body of another stroke
    1. An end of the first stroke is connected to the following stroke's body, such as 匕 (stroke order: ㇓㇟),
    2. The body of the first stroke is connected to an end of the following stroke, such as: 人 (㇓㇏).
  2. Two strokes are connected end to end, including
    1. head-to-head (首首), such as 厂 (stroke order: ㇐㇓),
    2. tail-to-tail (尾尾), such as the first two strokes of 弓 (㇕㇐㇉),
    3. tail-to-head (尾首), such as 了 (㇇㇚). Another example: in character 口 (㇑㇕㇐), the first two strokes are connected head-to-head, the second two tail-to-tail, and the last stroke is connected to the first stroke head-to-tail.
3. Intersection: the strokes are intersected. Such as: 十丈車.

In a Chinese character, multiple stroke combinations are usually used together. Such as: 港.

The same strokes and stroke order may form different Chinese characters or character components due to different combinations. For example:

- 刀力 (stroke order: ㇆㇓),
- 由田 (㇑㇕㇐㇑㇐),
- 工土士 (㇐㇑㇐),
- 八人入乂 (㇓㇏),
- 甲曱申叶 (㇑㇕㇐㇐㇑),
- 己已巳 (㇕㇐㇟).

Stroke combinations can function to distinguish Chinese characters.

== Distribution ==
The following tables present some experimental results on the distribution of Chinese character strokes in several dictionaries and character sets. The strokes are summarized in the five categories of heng (横, 一 'horizontal'), shu (竖, 丨 'vertical'), pie (撇, 丿 'left-falling'), dian (点, 丶 'dot') and zhe (折, 𠃍 'bent').

=== Frequency ===
Frequency of strokes in the Cihai
Stroke type	Characters	Appearances	Frequency (%)
heng	15,830	63,658	30.6638%
shu	14,997	39,811	19.1761%
zhe	15,222	36505	17.5845%
dian	13,832	36,346	17.5076%
pie	14,202	31,285	15.0695%

where field Characters includes the numbers of characters containing the strokes of each type, and field Appearances includes the number of appearances of the strokes in each type. The data is from an experiment on the 16,339 traditional and simplified Chinese characters in the Cihai (1979 edition), sorted in descending order of frequencies of appearance.

Frequencies of strokes in the Unicode CJK Chinese character set
Stroke type	Characters	Appearances	Frequency (%)
heng	20,219	82,712	30.808%
shu	19,302	51,460	19.167%
dian	17,754	48,089	17.912%
zhe	19,310	45,279	16.865%
pie	18,295	40,940	15.249%

The data is from an experiment on the 20,902 traditional and simplified Chinese characters in the GB13000.1 character set—equivalent to the Unicode BMP CJK Chinese character set—sorted in descending order of frequencies of appearance.

The statistical results above made by different people on different character sets are basically consistent: The most commonly used stroke is heng (㇐), followed by shu (㇑). The least used is pie (㇓). The orders of dian (㇔) and zhe (㇕) are different, though their frequencies are close.

=== Initial and final strokes of characters ===
Chinese Character Information Dictionary initial and final strokes for characters
Stroke type	Characters started	Frequency (%)	Characters ended	Frequency (%)
heng	2322	29.827%	2288	29.390%
pie	1767	22.697%	360	4.624%
dian	1729	22.209%	3115	40.012%
shu	1247	16.017%	1202	15.439%
zhe	719	9.248%	819	10.533%

There are 2,322 characters started with the heng stroke, 29.827% of the dictionary. There are 2,288 characters that end with heng, or 29.390% of the dictionary.

The data of the table is from an experiment on the 7,784 characters in the Chinese Character Information Dictionary, sorted in descending order of numbers of characters started.

Unicode CJK character set first and last strokes of characters
Stroke type	Characters started	Frequency (%)	Characters ended	Frequency (%)
heng	6194	29.632%	5819	27.837%
pie	4953	23.695%	890	4.258%
dian	4506	21.557%	8964	42.882%
shu	3305	15.811%	3089	14.777%
zhe	1945	9.305%	2142	10.247%

The data is from an experiment on the 20,902 traditional and simplified Chinese characters in the GB13000.1 character set—equivalent to the Unicode BMP CJK character set—sorted by the number of characters started in descending order.

The above statistical results on the first and last strokes of Chinese characters made by different people on different character sets are consistent.

The descending orders of strokes by number of characters started are all

1. heng
2. pie
3. dian
4. shu
5. zhe

and the descending orders of strokes by number of characters ended are all

1. dian
2. heng
3. shu
4. zhe
5. pie

Some rules can be drawn from here, such as: Stroke pie generally does not appear as the last stroke of a character or component, but more often as the first stroke. Stroke dian, including na (捺), appear more often at the end of characters or components.

== Eight Principles of Yong ==
The Eight Principles of Yong explain how to write eight common strokes in regular script which are found all in one character, 永 (pinyin: yǒng, "forever", "permanence"). It was traditionally believed that the frequent practice of these principles as a beginning calligrapher could ensure beauty in one's writing.

Eight principle strokes extracted from 永, "eternity" (five basic strokes: D, T, W, P, N and one compound stroke HZG). Enlarge this image to see the red arrows, showing the way of writing of each.

Eight basic strokes
－ the Diǎn 點 / 点, is a dot, filled from the top, to the bottom, traditionally made by "couching" the brush on the page.
－ the Héng 横, is horizontal, filled from left to right, the same way the Latin letters A, B, C, D are written.
－ the Shù 豎 / 竖, is vertical-falling. The brush begins by a dot on top, then falls downward.
－ the Gōu 鈎(鉤) / 钩, ending another stroke, is a sharp change of direction either down (after a Heng) or left (after a Shù).
－ the Tí 提 / Tiāo 提, is a flick up and rightwards.
－ the Wān 彎 / 弯, follows a concave path on the left or on the right.
－ the Piě 撇, is a falling leftwards (with a slight curve).
－ the Nà 捺, is falling rightwards (with an emphasis at the end of the stroke).
(+ － the Xié 斜 is sometimes added to the 永's strokes. It's a concave Shù falling right, always ended by a Gōu).

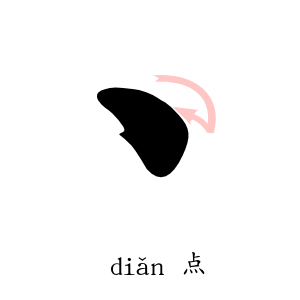

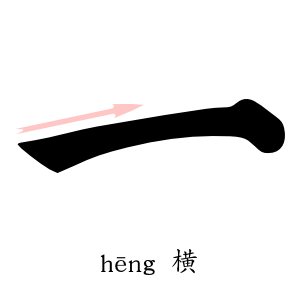

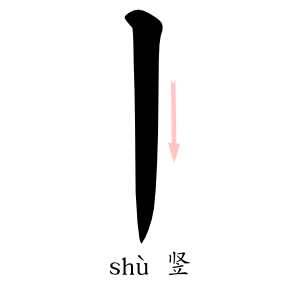

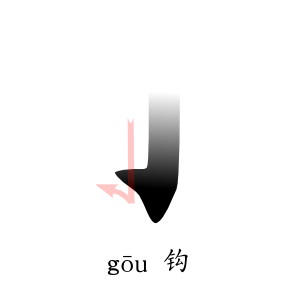

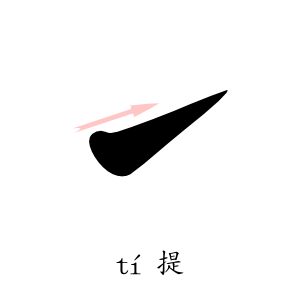

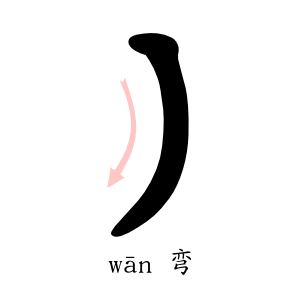

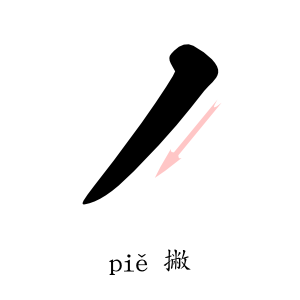

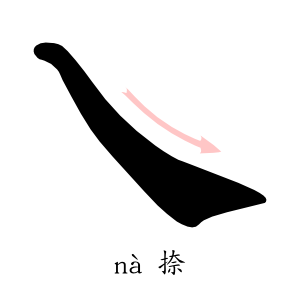

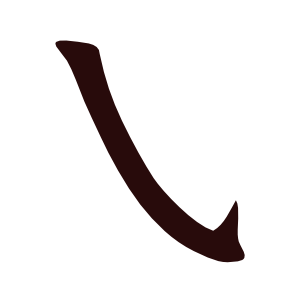
( )

== Use in computing ==
The stroke count method is based on the order of strokes to input characters on Chinese mobile phones.

As part of Chinese character encoding, there have been several proposals to encode the CJK strokes, most of the time with a total around 35~40 entries. Most notable is the current Unicode block “CJK Strokes” (U+31C0..U+31EF), with 38 types of strokes:

CJK Strokes^{[1]}^{[2]} Official Unicode Consortium code chart (PDF)
	0	1	2	3	4	5	6	7	8	9	A	B	C	D	E	F
U+31Cx	㇀	㇁	㇂	㇃	㇄	㇅	㇆	㇇	㇈	㇉	㇊	㇋	㇌	㇍	㇎	㇏
U+31Dx	㇐	㇑	㇒	㇓	㇔	㇕	㇖	㇗	㇘	㇙	㇚	㇛	㇜	㇝	㇞	㇟
U+31Ex	㇠	㇡	㇢	㇣	㇤	㇥										㇯
Notes 1.As of Unicode version 17.0 2.Grey areas indicate non-assigned code points

== See also ==
- Chinese character description languages
- Chinese whole characters
