= Eight Principles of Yong =

Demonstration of CJK character strokes

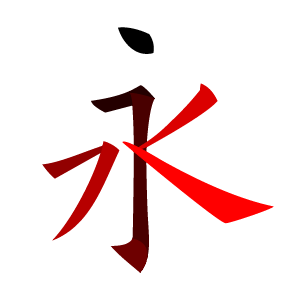
- The character 永; yǒng; 'forever'', ''permanence': its stroke order animated (left) and colored sequentially from black to red (right)

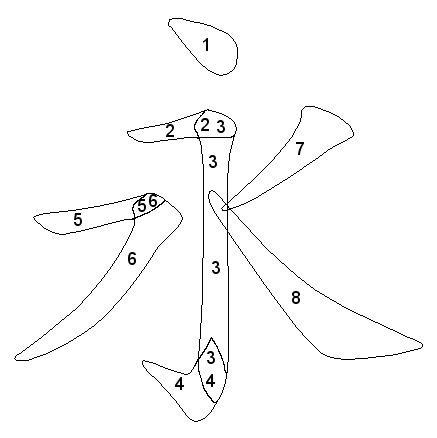
- The strokes numbered: where there are multiple numbers in an area, the strokes overlap briefly and continue from the previous number to the next.

- The strokes together and separated: sequence numbers, and stroke directions (red)

Eight Principles of Yong

Chinese name
- Chinese: 永字八法
Transcriptions
Standard Mandarin
- Hanyu Pinyin: Yǒngzì Bā Fǎ
- Wade–Giles: Yung^{3}tzu^{4} Pa^{1} Fa^{3}
Hakka
- Romanization: Yúnsṳ̀ Pat Fap
Yue: Cantonese
- Jyutping: Wing5zi6 Baat3 Faat3
Southern Min
- Tâi-lô: Íngjī Pat Huat

Vietnamese name
- Vietnamese alphabet: Vĩnh tự bát pháp
- Chữ Hán: 永字八法

Korean name
- Hangul: 영자팔법
- Hanja: 永字八法
Transcriptions
- Revised Romanization: Yeongjapalbeop

Japanese name
- Kanji: 永字八法
- Kana: えいじはっぽう
Transcriptions
- Romanization: Eiji happō

The Eight Principles of Yong are used by calligraphers to practice how to write the eight most common strokes in regular script, using the fact that they are all present in the character 永; yǒng; ''forever'', ''permanence''. It was believed that the frequent practice of these principles as such when beginning one's study could ensure beauty in the Chinese calligrapher's writing.

The Eight Principles are influenced by the Eastern Jin-era Seven Powers (七勢) by Lady Wei Shuo. Publications on the principles include:

- The Tang-era Praise to the Eight Principles of "Yong" (永字八法頌) by Liu Zongyuan
- The Tang-era Praise to the Eight Principles of "Yong" (永字八法頌) by Yan Zhenqing
- The Yuan-era Eight Ways to Explain "Yong" (永字八法解) by Li Puguang, which provides two-character metaphorical names

== Table ==
Yongzi principles (stroke components) by stroke order
Principle		Pinyin abbr.	Name				Additional description
Principle		Pinyin abbr.	Tang-era	Li	Modern Chinese	Vietnamese	Additional description
1	㇔	D	側; 侧; cè; 'side'	怪石; guàishí; 'dot'	點; 点; diǎn; 'dot'	chấm	Tiny dash, speck
2	㇐	H	勒; lè; 'bridle'	玉案; yù'àn; 'jade table'	橫; 横; héng; 'horizontal'	sổ ngang	Rightward
3	㇑	S	弩; nǔ; 'crossbow'; 努; nǔ; 'strive'	鐵柱; 铁柱; tiězhù; 'iron pillar'	豎、竪; 竖; shù; 'erect'; 鐵杵; 铁杵; tiěchǔ; 'iron staff'	sổ dọc	Downward
4	㇚	G	趯; tì; 'jump'	蟹爪; xièzhuǎ; 'crab's pincer'	鉤、鈎; 钩; gōu; 'hook'	móc	Appended to others, suddenly going down, or left only
5	㇀	T	策; cè; 'horsewhip'	虎牙; hǔyá; 'tiger's tooth'	提; tí; 'raise'; 挑; tiāo; 'lift-off'	hất	Flick up and rightwards
6	㇁	W	掠; lüè; 'skim'	犀角; xījiǎo; 'rhinoceros's horn'	彎; 弯; wān; 'curve'	cong	Tapering thinning curve, usually concave left (convex outward right) with fast speed as if skimming
7	㇒	P	啄; zhuó; 'to peck'	鳥啄; 鸟啄; niǎozhuó; 'bird's pecking'	撇; piě; 'throw away'; 短撇; duǎnpiě; 'short slant'	phẩy	Falling leftwards with light curve
8	㇏	N	磔; zhé; 'dismember'	金刀; jīndāo; 'golden knife'	捺; nà; 'press firmly'; 波; bō; 'wave'	mác	Falling rightwards, fattening at bottom, where endpoint is "sharp as a knife"

=== CJK strokes ===
In addition to these eight common strokes in 永, there are at least two dozen strokes of combinations which enter in the composition of CJK strokes and by inclusion the CJK characters themselves. Most strokes are encoded in Unicode as symbols, to be used in ideographic description sequences (IDS). The standard characters names assigned in the UCS for these CJK strokes are based on initials of the modern Chinese names (romanized with Pinyin) of component principles with which they are recognized and drawn.

== Gallery ==
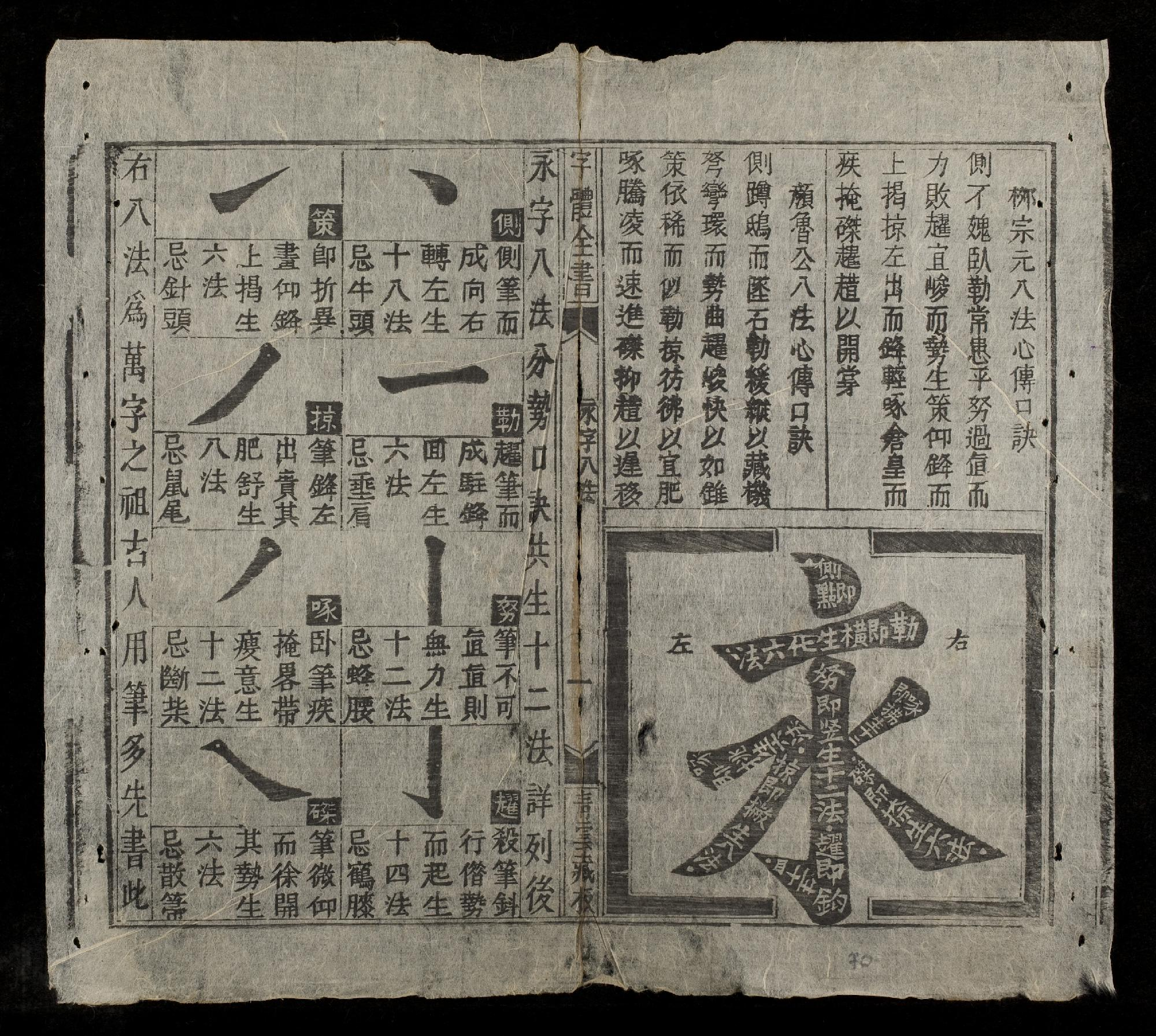
The principles, as shown in the Vietnamese book Nhật dụng thường đàm 日用常談 (1851), with their individual strokes

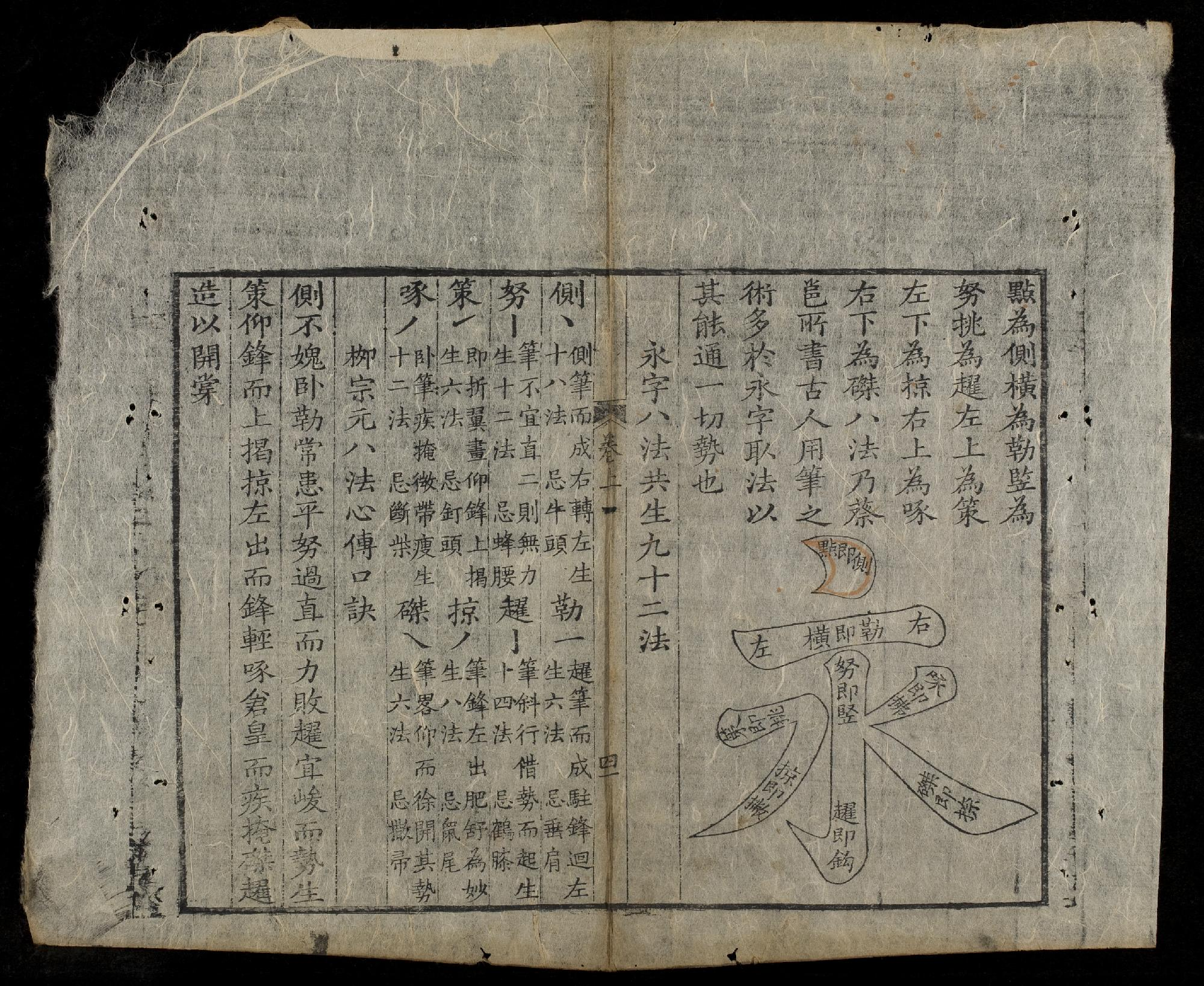
A section in Ngũ vân lâu tăng đính tứ thể thư pháp 五雲摟增訂四體書法 (1848), explaining the concept of the Eight Principles of Yong

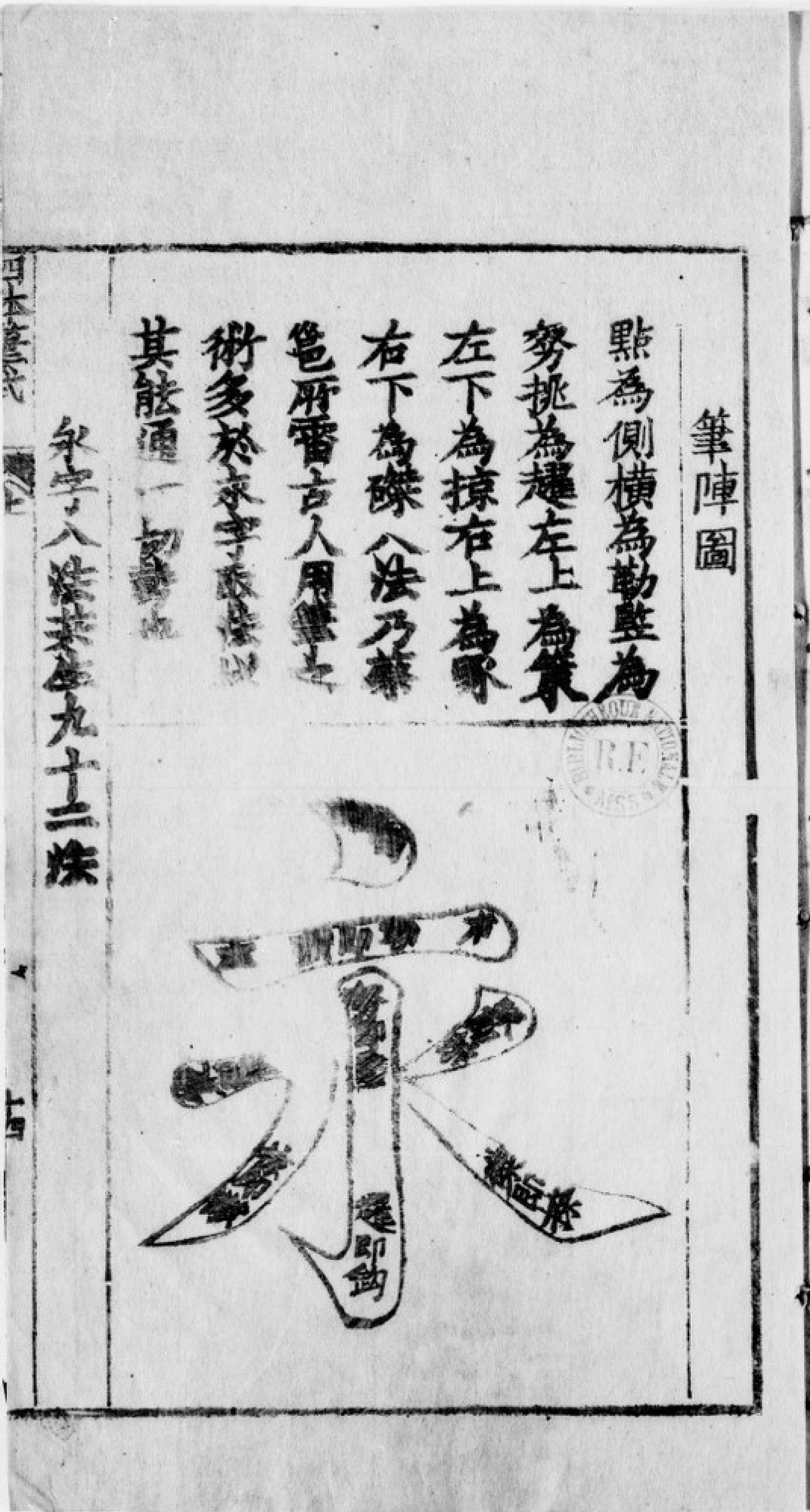
The Eight Principles of Yong depicted the calligraphy book, Tứ thể bút thức 四體筆式 (1869)

== See also ==
- CJK characters
- CJK strokes
