= CJK Strokes (Unicode block) =

- Range: U+31C0..U+31EF (48 code points)
- Plane: BMP
- Scripts: Common
- Assigned: 39 code points
- Unused: 9 reserved code points
- Source standards: HKSCS–2001

Unicode Version History
- 4.1 (2005): 16 (+16)
- 5.1 (2008): 36 (+20)
- 15.1 (2023): 37 (+1)
- 16.0 (2024): 39 (+2)

Unicode documentation
- Code chart ∣ Web page

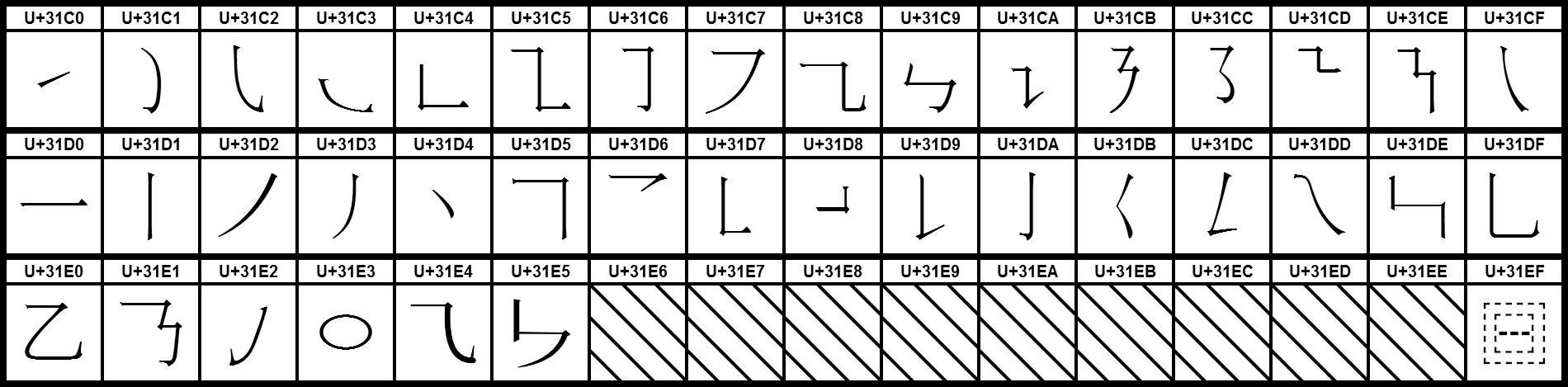
Graphical representation of the CJK Strokes Unicode block. Hatched boxes indicate non-assigned code points.

CJK Strokes is a Unicode block containing examples of each of the standard CJK stroke types.

== Block ==
CJK Strokes^{[1]}^{[2]} Official Unicode Consortium code chart (PDF)
	0	1	2	3	4	5	6	7	8	9	A	B	C	D	E	F
U+31Cx	㇀	㇁	㇂	㇃	㇄	㇅	㇆	㇇	㇈	㇉	㇊	㇋	㇌	㇍	㇎	㇏
U+31Dx	㇐	㇑	㇒	㇓	㇔	㇕	㇖	㇗	㇘	㇙	㇚	㇛	㇜	㇝	㇞	㇟
U+31Ex	㇠	㇡	㇢	㇣	㇤	㇥										㇯
Notes 1.As of Unicode version 18.0 2.Grey areas indicate non-assigned code points

== Variant forms ==
The CJK Strokes block has seventeen variation sequences defined for standardized variants, depending on the font:

Variation sequences using VS01 (U+FE00)
Base character	Base	+VS01	Description
U+31C0 CJK STROKE T	㇀	㇀︀	dotted T form
U+31C6 CJK STROKE HZG	㇆	㇆︀	curved Z form
U+31C9 CJK STROKE SZWG	㇉	㇉︀	slanted S form
U+31CF CJK STROKE N	㇏	㇏︀	curved starting N form
U+31D0 CJK STROKE H	㇐	㇐︀	rising H form
U+31D1 CJK STROKE S	㇑	㇑︀	slanted S form
U+31D2 CJK STROKE P	㇒	㇒︀	flat P form
U+31D4 CJK STROKE D	㇔	㇔︀	to bottom left form
U+31D5 CJK STROKE HZ	㇕	㇕︀	slanted Z form
U+31D7 CJK STROKE SZ	㇗	㇗︀	slanted S form
U+31DB CJK STROKE PD	㇛	㇛︀	slanted SD form
U+31DC CJK STROKE PZ	㇜	㇜︀	upwards T form
U+31DD CJK STROKE TN	㇝	㇝︀	horizontal H curved N form
U+31E5 CJK STROKE SZP	㇥	㇥︀	slanted S form

Variation sequences using VS02 (U+FE01)
Base character	Base	+VS02	Description
U+31C6 CJK STROKE HZG	㇆	㇆︁	rising H form
U+31CF CJK STROKE N	㇏	㇏︁	flat N form
U+31DD CJK STROKE TN	㇝	㇝︁	upwards T flat N form

== History ==
The following Unicode-related documents record the purpose and process of defining specific characters in the CJK Strokes block:

Version	Final code points (Note: Proposed code points and characters names may differ from final code points and names)	Count	L2 ID	WG2 ID	IRG ID	Document
4.1	U+31C0..31CF	16	L2/03-411			Goldsmith, Deborah; Muller, Eric (2003-10-31), Unencoded chars in GB 18030 & HK-SCS
4.1	U+31C0..31CF	16	L2/04-161R	N2807		Suignard, Michel; Muller, Eric; Jenkins, John (2004-06-17), HKSCS and GB 18030 PUA characters, background document
4.1	U+31C0..31CF	16	L2/04-263	N2808		Suignard, Michel (2004-06-17), HKSCS and GB 18030 PUA characters, request for additional characters and related information
4.1	U+31C0..31CF	16	L2/05-058			Whistler, Ken (2005-02-03), "C. Changes to CJK strokes block", WG2 Consent Docket, Part 1: Unicode 4.1 Issues
4.1	U+31C0..31CF	16	L2/05-026			Moore, Lisa (2005-05-16), "WG2 - Unicode 4.1 Consent Docket (B.1.16.1)", UTC #102 Minutes
4.1	U+31C0..31CF	16			N2681	Koo, Night (2024-03-18), Preliminary Proposal to Add Standardised Variation Sequences for CJK Strokes [Affects U+31C0, 31C6, 31C9, and 31CF]
4.1	U+31C0..31CF	16	L2/26-073			Koo, Night (2026-03-04), Proposal to Add Standardised Variation Sequences for CJK Strokes [Affects U+31C0, 31C6, 31C9, and 31CF]
4.1	U+31C0..31CF	16	L2/26-099			Lunde, Ken (2026-04-11), "32 [Affects U+31C0, 31C6, 31C9, and 31CF]", CJK & Unihan Working Group Recommendations for UTC #187 Meeting
4.1	U+31C0..31CF	16	L2/26-093			"Consensus 187-C36 [Affects U+31C0, 31C6, 31C9, and 31CF]", UTC #187 meeting minutes, 2026-04-29, "Accept ... 17 new standardized variation sequences"
5.1	U+31D0..31E3	20	L2/03-387		N986	Cook, Richard (2003-10-26), Chinese Character Description Language (CDL)
5.1	U+31D0..31E3	20	L2/03-404			Bishop, Thomas; Cook, Richard (2003-10-28), A Specification for CDL -- Character Description Language
5.1	U+31D0..31E3	20	L2/03-420		N987	Bishop, Thomas; Cook, Richard (2003-11-04), Character Description Language (CDL): The Set of Basic CJK Unified Stroke Types
5.1	U+31D0..31E3	20	L2/04-221	N2817	N1096	Bishop, Thomas; Cook, Richard (2004-06-07), Proposal to add a block of CJK Unified Basic Strokes to the UCS
5.1	U+31D0..31E3	20	L2/04-367	N2864	N1097	Bishop, Thomas; Cook, Richard (2004-10-25), Proposal to add a block of CJK Basic Strokes to the UCS
5.1	U+31D0..31E3	20	L2/06-212	N3063	N1180	Lu, Qin (2006-04-03), Proposed additions to the CJK Strokes block of the UCS
5.1	U+31D0..31E3	20	L2/06-108			Moore, Lisa (2006-05-25), "C.4", UTC #107 Minutes
5.1	U+31D0..31E3	20		N3103 (pdf, doc)		Umamaheswaran, V. S. (2006-08-25), "M48.12", Unconfirmed minutes of WG 2 meeting 48, Mountain View, CA, USA; 2006-04-24/27
5.1	U+31D0..31E3	20	L2/23-221			Koo, Night (2023-10-01), Proposal to modify the representative glyph of U+31D2 CJK STROKE P
5.1	U+31D0..31E3	20	L2/23-237R			Lunde, Ken (2023-11-02), "19", CJK & Unihan Group Recommendations for UTC #177 Meeting
5.1	U+31D0..31E3	20	L2/23-231			Constable, Peter (2023-12-08), "Section 19", UTC #177 Minutes, "Consensus 177-C14: Accept the proposal to change the representative glyph for U+31D2"
5.1	U+31D0..31E3	20			N2681	Koo, Night (2024-03-18), Preliminary Proposal to Add Standardised Variation Sequences for CJK Strokes [Affects U+31D0-31D2, 31D4, 31D5, 31D7, and 31DB-31DD]
5.1	U+31D0..31E3	20	L2/26-073			Koo, Night (2026-03-04), Proposal to Add Standardised Variation Sequences for CJK Strokes [Affects U+31D0-31D2, 31D4, 31D5, 31D7, and 31DB-31DD]
5.1	U+31D0..31E3	20	L2/26-099			Lunde, Ken (2026-04-11), "32 [Affects U+31D0-31D2, 31D4, 31D5, 31D7, and 31DB-31DD]", CJK & Unihan Working Group Recommendations for UTC #187 Meeting
5.1	U+31D0..31E3	20	L2/26-093			"Consensus 187-C36 [Affects U+31D0-31D2, 31D4, 31D5, 31D7, and 31DB-31DD]", UTC #187 meeting minutes, 2026-04-29, "Accept ... 17 new standardized variation sequences"
15.1	U+31EF	1	L2/21-118R		N2492	Lunde, Ken; Jenkins, John H. (2021-08-11), Preliminary proposal to add a new provisional kIDS property (Unihan)
15.1	U+31EF	1	L2/22-136			West, Andrew (2022-07-08), Feedback on Proposals to Encode New Ideographic Description Characters
15.1	U+31EF	1	L2/22-191		N2572	Lunde, Ken; Jenkins, John; West, Andrew (2022-08-24), Proposal to encode five new Ideographic Description Characters
15.1	U+31EF	1	L2/22-227			SAT Feedback to "Preliminary proposal to add a new provisional kIDS property (Unihan)" (IRGN2492) and "Proposal to encode five new Ideographic Description Characters" (IRGN2572), 2022-08-29
15.1	U+31EF	1	L2/22-228			Fan, Ming (2022-09-02), Feedback on IRGN2572 "Proposal to encode 5 new ideograph description characters"
15.1	U+31EF	1	L2/22-247			Lunde, Ken (2022-11-01), "29", CJK & Unihan Group Recommendations for UTC #173 Meeting
15.1	U+31EF	1	L2/22-241			Constable, Peter (2022-11-09), "E.1 29", Approved Minutes of UTC Meeting 173
16.0	U+31E4..31E5	2			N1212	China national body (2006-06-05), Proposed dis-unification of 2 strokes
16.0	U+31E4..31E5	2			N1217	China national body (2006-06-07), Proposition to drop IRGN1212 from China
16.0	U+31E4..31E5	2	L2/14-007			Low, Ian; Cook, Richard (2014-01-13), 12 additional characters for Unicode CJK Stroke group (email thread)
16.0	U+31E4..31E5	2	L2/23-220		N2647	Koo, Night (2023-10-01), Proposal to encode (disunify) two stroke characters in CJK Strokes block
16.0	U+31E4..31E5	2	L2/23-237R			Lunde, Ken (2023-11-02), "18", CJK & Unihan Group Recommendations for UTC #177 Meeting
16.0	U+31E4..31E5	2	L2/23-231			Constable, Peter (2023-12-08), "Section 18", UTC #177 Minutes
16.0	U+31E4..31E5	2	L2/24-044			Koo, Night (2024-02-19), Correcting the proposed name of new character U+31E4 in Unicode 16.0
16.0	U+31E4..31E5	2			N2681	Koo, Night (2024-03-18), Preliminary Proposal to Add Standardised Variation Sequences for CJK Strokes [Affects U+31E5]
16.0	U+31E4..31E5	2	L2/24-067			Lunde, Ken (2024-04-19), "32 [Affects U+31E4]", CJK & Unihan Working Group Recommendations for UTC #179 Meeting
16.0	U+31E4..31E5	2	L2/24-061			Constable, Peter (2024-04-29), "Consensus 179-C17", UTC #179 Minutes, "Accept the proposal to change the name of U+31E4, from CJK STROKE HZXG to CJK STROKE HXG"
16.0	U+31E4..31E5	2	L2/26-073			Koo, Night (2026-03-04), Proposal to Add Standardised Variation Sequences for CJK Strokes [Affects U+31E5]
16.0	U+31E4..31E5	2	L2/26-099			Lunde, Ken (2026-04-11), "32 [Affects U+31E5]", CJK & Unihan Working Group Recommendations for UTC #187 Meeting
16.0	U+31E4..31E5	2	L2/26-093			"Consensus 187-C36 [Affects U+31E5]", UTC #187 meeting minutes, 2026-04-29, "Accept ... 17 new standardized variation sequences"
