= Xinhua Dictionary =

Chinese language dictionary

13th (2026) edition of Xinhua Zidian

The Xinhua Zidian (Chinese: 新华字典; pinyin: Xīnhuá Zìdiǎn; lit. 'New Chinese Dictionary'), also as Xinhua Dictionary, is a Chinese-language dictionary published by the Commercial Press. The first edition of Xinhua Zidian was published in 1957. The most recent version is the 13th edition, which was published in June 2026.

It is the best-selling Chinese dictionary and the world's most popular reference work. In 2016, Guinness World Records officially confirmed that the dictionary, published by The Commercial Press, is the "Most popular dictionary" and the "Best-selling book (regularly updated)". It is considered a symbol of Chinese culture.

This pocket-sized dictionary of Chinese characters uses simplified Chinese characters and pinyin romanization. The most recent Xinhua Zidian edition (the 12th) contains 3,300 compounds and includes over 13,000 logograms, including traditional Chinese characters and variant Chinese characters. Bopomofo is used as a supplement alongside Pinyin. Xinhua Zidian is divided into 189 "radicals" or "section headers". More recent editions have followed a GB13000.1 national standard in using a 201-radical system.

Besides their popular concise version Xinhua Zidian, Commercial Press also publishes a large-print edition and a Xinhua Dictionary with English Translation. In addition, the Shanxi Education Press publishes a pinyin-edition Xinhua Zidian with both characters and orthographically precise transcriptions.

== History ==
Under the aegis of the Chinese Academy of Social Sciences, the People's Education Press published the original Xinhua Zidian in 1953. The linguist and lexicographer Wei Jiangong (魏建功, 1901–1980) was chief editor. In 1957, the Commercial Press published the Xinhua Zidian (1st edition), which was alphabetically collated in pinyin order. They have subsequently revised this dictionary ten times, with over 200 printing runs, and it is a longtime bestseller among students in China. In early 2004, the total number of published copies exceeded 400 million.

When San Marino, a tiny country surrounded by Italy, was building a relationship with China in the 1970s, the Sammarinese gave a three-volume encyclopedia they had published, as a present to Chinese officials. However, due to the chaos caused by the Cultural Revolution in the area of publishing, China only could give a copy of the little Xinhua Zidian in return. As a result, the Chinese government decided to publish a series of new dictionaries in 1975, including Hanyu Da Cidian and some Chinese-foreign languages dictionaries.

The dictionary was strongly affected by the political environment under Mao. In its 1971 edition, the dictionary contained 46 quotations of Chairman Mao, and slogans such as "Long live Chairman Mao!"

== Mobile app ==
The Commercial Press presented its official app on Apple Store in June 2017. It supports identifying hànzì characters by handwriting, voice, or camera. It also provides a pronunciation of the characters read by Li Ruiying, the former news presenter of Xinwen Lianbo.

== Lawsuits ==
The use of the term Xinhua Zidian has been disputed in China since the publishing of the dictionary is no longer arranged by the government. The Commercial Press insisted that the name is a specific term while other publishing houses believed that it is a generic term, as many of them published their own Chinese dictionary under the name. In 2016, The Commercial Press (Beijing) filed a lawsuit at Beijing intellectual property court, claiming Sinolingua Co., Ltd. had violated The Commercial Press's trademark for Xinhua Zidian by publishing Xinhua Zidian without permission from The Commercial Press, even though the trademark name was not registered. The original case started when 3.2 million copies of student edition of Xinhua Zidian (学生新华字典) published by a company in Hubei were recalled for poor quality.

== See also ==
- List of best-selling books
- Xiandai Hanyu Cidian
