= Enclosed typographic characters =

Enclosed typographic characters may refer to:

Unicode blocks

- Enclosed Alphanumerics
- Enclosed Alphanumeric Supplement
- Enclosed CJK Letters and Months
- Enclosed Ideographic Supplement

Characters

- Enclosed A
- Enclosed C
- Enclosed R
- Enclosed T

== See also ==
- Circle-c (disambiguation)
- Circled-a (disambiguation)
