= Radical 188 =

Chinese character radical

骨
- Radical 188 (U+2FBB)
- 骨 (U+9AA8) "bone"

Pronunciations
- Pinyin: gǔ
- Bopomofo: ㄍㄨˇ
- Wade–Giles: ku3
- Cantonese Yale: gwat1
- Jyutping: gwat1
- Japanese Kana: コツ kotsu / コチ kochi (on'yomi) ほね hone (kun'yomi)
- Sino-Korean: 골 gol
- Hán-Việt: cốt, cọt, cút, gút

Names
- Chinese name(s): 骨字旁 gǔzìpáng
- Japanese name(s): 骨偏/ほねへん honehen
- Hangul: 뼈 ppyeo

Stroke order animation

Radical 188 or radical bone (骨部) meaning "bone" is one of the 8 Kangxi radicals (214 radicals in total) composed of 10 strokes.

In the Kangxi Dictionary, there are 185 characters (out of 49,030) to be found under this radical.

骨 (9 strokes in Simplified Chinese) is also the 182nd indexing component in the Table of Indexing Chinese Character Components predominantly adopted by Simplified Chinese dictionaries published in mainland China.

== Evolution ==
Shang dynasty Oracle bone script

Shang dynasty Bronze script

Chu slip and silk script

Qin slip script

Large seal script character

Small seal script character

== Derived characters ==
Strokes	Characters
+0	骨
+2	骩
+3	骪 骫 骬 骭 骮
+4	骯 骰 骱
+5	骲 骳 骴 骵 (=體) 骶 骷
+6	骸 骹 骺 骻 骼
+7	骽 (=腿 -> 肉) 骾 (=鯁 -> 魚)
+8	骿 髀 髁
+9	髂 髃 髄 (=髓) 髅^{SC} (=髏)
+10	髆 髇 髈 (=膀 -> 肉) 髉 髊 髋^{SC} (=髖) 髌^{SC} (=髕)
+11	髍 髎 髏
+12	髐
+13	髑 髒 髓 體
+14	髕
+15	髖
+16	髗

== Variant Forms ==
This radical character is written in different countries and regions.

In the Kangxi Dictionary, the twist inside the upper component (冎) is positioned to the right (◲, ⾻), and the lower part of the character is 月 with the first stroke vertical (This component means "meat" instead of "moon". See Radical 130 肉). This form is inherited in modern Japanese, Korean, and Hong Kong Traditional Chinese.

In Taiwan standard (骨), while the upper twist is positioned to the right, the lower component meaning "meat" (Radical 130 肉) became ⺼ (two horizontal strokes become a dot and a rising stroke) to distinguish from 月 ("moon", Radical 74).

In mainland China, the xin zixing (new printing typeface) reform stipulates that the twist inside the upper component is positioned to the left (◱, 骨), while the lower part remains unchanged. This form is used in modern Simplified Chinese (Mainland China, Singapore, Malaysia) and also in Traditional Chinese publications in mainland China (This change of direction reduces stroke count from 10 to 9).

A more ancient form of this radical character is 人 inside the frame, from which the "orthodox" form found in the Kangxi Dictionary and the xin zixing form is derived. Both derived forms along with the ancient form had been used in ancient publications and writing.

Kangxi Dictionary

Stroke order in Taiwan standard

Stroke order in Hong Kong and Japanese standard

Stroke order in Simplified Chinese

Kangxi Dict Japanese Korean Trad. Chinese (HK & MO)	Trad. Chinese (Taiwan)	Simp. Chinese Trad. Chinese (xin zixing)
骨	骨	骨

== Sinogram ==
As an individual character this is one of the Kyōiku kanji or Kanji taught in elementary school in Japan. It is a sixth grade kanji.

== Literature ==
- Fazzioli, Edoardo (1987). Chinese calligraphy : from pictograph to ideogram : the history of 214 essential Chinese/Japanese characters. calligraphy by Rebecca Hon Ko. New York: Abbeville Press. ISBN 0-89659-774-1.
