= B24 =

B24 or B-24 may refer to:

- Consolidated B-24 Liberator, an American World War II heavy bomber
- Autovia B-24, a highway in Catalonia, Spain connecting Barcelona to the towns of Penedès
- Blackburn B-24, a 1937 carrier-based aircraft
- B24 Sierra, a single-engined aircraft in the Beechcraft Musketeer family
- ARIB STD B24

== See also ==
- A model of the Lancia Aurelia car
