= Enclosed Alphanumeric Supplement =

Group of Unicode symbols

- Range: U+1F100..U+1F1FF (256 code points)
- Plane: SMP
- Scripts: Common
- Assigned: 201 code points
- Unused: 55 reserved code points

Unicode Version History
- 5.2 (2009): 63 (+63)
- 6.0 (2010): 169 (+106)
- 6.1 (2012): 171 (+2)
- 7.0 (2014): 173 (+2)
- 9.0 (2016): 191 (+18)
- 11.0 (2018): 192 (+1)
- 12.0 (2019): 193 (+1)
- 13.0 (2020): 200 (+7)
- 18.0 (2026): 201 (+1)

Unicode documentation
- Code chart ∣ Web page

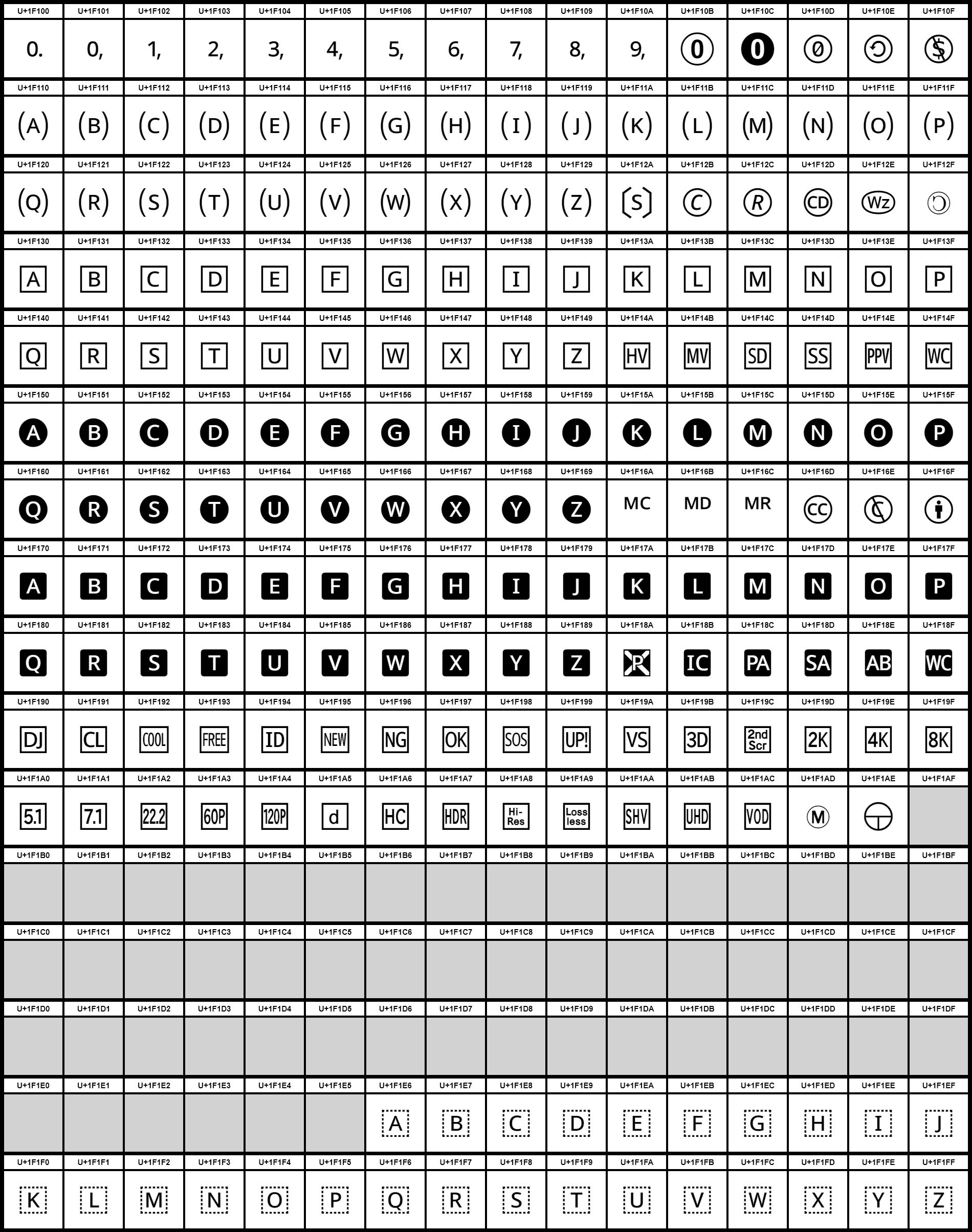
Graphical representation of the Enclosed Alphanumeric Supplement Unicode block

Enclosed Alphanumeric Supplement is a Unicode block consisting of Latin alphabet characters and Arabic numerals enclosed in circles, ovals or boxes, used for a variety of purposes. It is encoded in the range U+1F100–U+1F1FF in the Supplementary Multilingual Plane.

The block is mostly an extension of the Enclosed Alphanumerics block, containing further enclosed alphanumeric characters which are not included in that block or Enclosed CJK Letters and Months. Most of the characters are single alphanumerics in boxes or circles, or with trailing commas. Two of the symbols are identified as dingbats. A number of multiple-letter enclosed abbreviations are also included, mostly to provide compatibility with Broadcast Markup Language standards (see ARIB STD B24 character set) and Japanese telecommunications networks' emoji sets. The block also includes the regional indicator symbols to be used for emoji country flag support.

== Block ==
Enclosed Alphanumeric Supplement^{[1]}^{[2]} Official Unicode Consortium code chart (PDF)
| | 0 | 1 | 2 | 3 | 4 | 5 | 6 | 7 | 8 | 9 | A | B | C | D | E | F |
| U+1F10x | 🄀 | 🄁 | 🄂 | 🄃 | 🄄 | 🄅 | 🄆 | 🄇 | 🄈 | 🄉 | 🄊 | 🄋 | 🄌 | 🄍 | 🄎 | 🄏 |
| U+1F11x | 🄐 | 🄑 | 🄒 | 🄓 | 🄔 | 🄕 | 🄖 | 🄗 | 🄘 | 🄙 | 🄚 | 🄛 | 🄜 | 🄝 | 🄞 | 🄟 |
| U+1F12x | 🄠 | 🄡 | 🄢 | 🄣 | 🄤 | 🄥 | 🄦 | 🄧 | 🄨 | 🄩 | 🄪 | 🄫 | 🄬 | 🄭 | 🄮 | 🄯 |
| U+1F13x | 🄰 | 🄱 | 🄲 | 🄳 | 🄴 | 🄵 | 🄶 | 🄷 | 🄸 | 🄹 | 🄺 | 🄻 | 🄼 | 🄽 | 🄾 | 🄿 |
| U+1F14x | 🅀 | 🅁 | 🅂 | 🅃 | 🅄 | 🅅 | 🅆 | 🅇 | 🅈 | 🅉 | 🅊 | 🅋 | 🅌 | 🅍 | 🅎 | 🅏 |
| U+1F15x | 🅐 | 🅑 | 🅒 | 🅓 | 🅔 | 🅕 | 🅖 | 🅗 | 🅘 | 🅙 | 🅚 | 🅛 | 🅜 | 🅝 | 🅞 | 🅟 |
| U+1F16x | 🅠 | 🅡 | 🅢 | 🅣 | 🅤 | 🅥 | 🅦 | 🅧 | 🅨 | 🅩 | 🅪 | 🅫 | 🅬 | 🅭 | 🅮 | 🅯 |
| U+1F17x | 🅰 | 🅱 | 🅲 | 🅳 | 🅴 | 🅵 | 🅶 | 🅷 | 🅸 | 🅹 | 🅺 | 🅻 | 🅼 | 🅽 | 🅾 | 🅿 |
| U+1F18x | 🆀 | 🆁 | 🆂 | 🆃 | 🆄 | 🆅 | 🆆 | 🆇 | 🆈 | 🆉 | 🆊 | 🆋 | 🆌 | 🆍 | 🆎 | 🆏 |
| U+1F19x | 🆐 | 🆑 | 🆒 | 🆓 | 🆔 | 🆕 | 🆖 | 🆗 | 🆘 | 🆙 | 🆚 | 🆛 | 🆜 | 🆝 | 🆞 | 🆟 |
| U+1F1Ax | 🆠 | 🆡 | 🆢 | 🆣 | 🆤 | 🆥 | 🆦 | 🆧 | 🆨 | 🆩 | 🆪 | 🆫 | 🆬 | 🆭 | 🆮 | |
| U+1F1Bx | | | | | | | | | | | | | | | | |
| U+1F1Cx | | | | | | | | | | | | | | | | |
| U+1F1Dx | | | | | | | | | | | | | | | | |
| U+1F1Ex | | | | | | | 🇦 | 🇧 | 🇨 | 🇩 | 🇪 | 🇫 | 🇬 | 🇭 | 🇮 | 🇯 |
| U+1F1Fx | 🇰 | 🇱 | 🇲 | 🇳 | 🇴 | 🇵 | 🇶 | 🇷 | 🇸 | 🇹 | 🇺 | 🇻 | 🇼 | 🇽 | 🇾 | 🇿 |
Notes 1.As of Unicode version 18.0 2.Grey areas indicate non-assigned code points

== Emoji ==
The Enclosed Alphanumeric Supplement block contains 41 emoji: U+1F170, U+1F171, U+1F17E, U+1F17F, U+1F18E, U+1F191 – U+1F19A and U+1F1E6 – U+1F1FF.

The block has eight standardized variants defined to specify emoji-style (U+FE0F VS16) or text presentation (U+FE0E VS15) for the following four base characters: U+1F170, U+1F171, U+1F17E & U+1F17F. All of these base characters are defined as defaulting to a text presentation. Their appearance depends on the program (such as a browser) and the fonts used:

Emoji variation sequences
| U+ | 1F170 | 1F171 | 1F17E | 1F17F |
|---|---|---|---|---|
| base code point | 🅰 | 🅱 | 🅾 | 🅿 |
| base+VS15 (text) | 🅰︎ | 🅱︎ | 🅾︎ | 🅿︎ |
| base+VS16 (emoji) | 🅰️ | 🅱️ | 🅾️ | 🅿️ |

== History ==
The following Unicode-related documents record the purpose and process of defining specific characters in the Enclosed Alphanumeric Supplement block:

| Version | Final code points (Note: Proposed code points and characters names may differ from final code points and names) | Count | L2 ID | WG2 ID | Document |
|---|---|---|---|---|---|
| 5.2 | U+1F100..1F10A, 1F110..1F12D, 1F131, 1F13D, 1F13F, 1F142, 1F146, 1F14A..1F14E, 1F157, 1F15F, 1F179, 1F17B..1F17C, 1F17F, 1F18A..1F18D, 1F190 | 62 | | N3353 (pdf, doc) | Umamaheswaran, V. S. (2007-10-10), "M51.32", Unconfirmed minutes of WG 2 meeting 51 Hanzhou, China; 2007-04-24/27 |
| 5.2 | U+1F100..1F10A, 1F110..1F12D, 1F131, 1F13D, 1F13F, 1F142, 1F146, 1F14A..1F14E, 1F157, 1F15F, 1F179, 1F17B..1F17C, 1F17F, 1F18A..1F18D, 1F190 | 62 | L2/07-259 | | Suignard, Michel (2007-08-02), Japanese TV Symbols |
| 5.2 | U+1F100..1F10A, 1F110..1F12D, 1F131, 1F13D, 1F13F, 1F142, 1F146, 1F14A..1F14E, 1F157, 1F15F, 1F179, 1F17B..1F17C, 1F17F, 1F18A..1F18D, 1F190 | 62 | L2/07-391 | N3341 | Suignard, Michel (2007-09-18), Japanese TV Symbols |
| 5.2 | U+1F100..1F10A, 1F110..1F12D, 1F131, 1F13D, 1F13F, 1F142, 1F146, 1F14A..1F14E, 1F157, 1F15F, 1F179, 1F17B..1F17C, 1F17F, 1F18A..1F18D, 1F190 | 62 | L2/08-077R2 | N3397 | Suignard, Michel (2008-03-11), Japanese TV symbols |
| 5.2 | U+1F100..1F10A, 1F110..1F12D, 1F131, 1F13D, 1F13F, 1F142, 1F146, 1F14A..1F14E, 1F157, 1F15F, 1F179, 1F17B..1F17C, 1F17F, 1F18A..1F18D, 1F190 | 62 | L2/08-128 | | Iancu, Laurențiu (2008-03-22), Names and allocation of some Japanese TV symbols from N3397 |
| 5.2 | U+1F100..1F10A, 1F110..1F12D, 1F131, 1F13D, 1F13F, 1F142, 1F146, 1F14A..1F14E, 1F157, 1F15F, 1F179, 1F17B..1F17C, 1F17F, 1F18A..1F18D, 1F190 | 62 | L2/08-158 | | Pentzlin, Karl (2008-04-16), Comments on L2/08-077R2 "Japanese TV Symbols" |
| 5.2 | U+1F100..1F10A, 1F110..1F12D, 1F131, 1F13D, 1F13F, 1F142, 1F146, 1F14A..1F14E, 1F157, 1F15F, 1F179, 1F17B..1F17C, 1F17F, 1F18A..1F18D, 1F190 | 62 | L2/08-188 | N3468 | Sekiguchi, Masahiro (2008-04-22), Collected comments on Japanese TV Symbols (WG2 N3397) |
| 5.2 | U+1F100..1F10A, 1F110..1F12D, 1F131, 1F13D, 1F13F, 1F142, 1F146, 1F14A..1F14E, 1F157, 1F15F, 1F179, 1F17B..1F17C, 1F17F, 1F18A..1F18D, 1F190 | 62 | L2/08-077R3 | N3469 | Suignard, Michel (2008-04-23), Japanese TV symbols |
| 5.2 | U+1F100..1F10A, 1F110..1F12D, 1F131, 1F13D, 1F13F, 1F142, 1F146, 1F14A..1F14E, 1F157, 1F15F, 1F179, 1F17B..1F17C, 1F17F, 1F18A..1F18D, 1F190 | 62 | L2/08-215 | | Pentzlin, Karl (2008-05-07), Comments on L2/08-077R2 "Japanese TV Symbols" |
| 5.2 | U+1F100..1F10A, 1F110..1F12D, 1F131, 1F13D, 1F13F, 1F142, 1F146, 1F14A..1F14E, 1F157, 1F15F, 1F179, 1F17B..1F17C, 1F17F, 1F18A..1F18D, 1F190 | 62 | L2/08-289 | | Pentzlin, Karl (2008-08-05), Proposal to rename and reassign some Japanese TV Symbols from L2/08-077R3 |
| 5.2 | U+1F100..1F10A, 1F110..1F12D, 1F131, 1F13D, 1F13F, 1F142, 1F146, 1F14A..1F14E, 1F157, 1F15F, 1F179, 1F17B..1F17C, 1F17F, 1F18A..1F18D, 1F190 | 62 | L2/08-292 | | Stötzner, Andreas (2008-08-06), Improvement suggestions for n3469 |
| 5.2 | U+1F100..1F10A, 1F110..1F12D, 1F131, 1F13D, 1F13F, 1F142, 1F146, 1F14A..1F14E, 1F157, 1F15F, 1F179, 1F17B..1F17C, 1F17F, 1F18A..1F18D, 1F190 | 62 | L2/08-307 | | Scherer, Markus (2008-08-08), Feedback on the Japanese TV Symbols Proposal (L2/08-077R3) |
| 5.2 | U+1F100..1F10A, 1F110..1F12D, 1F131, 1F13D, 1F13F, 1F142, 1F146, 1F14A..1F14E, 1F157, 1F15F, 1F179, 1F17B..1F17C, 1F17F, 1F18A..1F18D, 1F190 | 62 | L2/08-318 | N3453 (pdf, doc) | Umamaheswaran, V. S. (2008-08-13), "M52.14", Unconfirmed minutes of WG 2 meeting 52 |
| 5.2 | U+1F100..1F10A, 1F110..1F12D, 1F131, 1F13D, 1F13F, 1F142, 1F146, 1F14A..1F14E, 1F157, 1F15F, 1F179, 1F17B..1F17C, 1F17F, 1F18A..1F18D, 1F190 | 62 | L2/08-161R2 | | Moore, Lisa (2008-11-05), "Consensus 115-C17", UTC #115 Minutes, "Approve 186 Japanese TV symbols for encoding in a future version of the standard." |
| 5.2 | U+1F100..1F10A, 1F110..1F12D, 1F131, 1F13D, 1F13F, 1F142, 1F146, 1F14A..1F14E, 1F157, 1F15F, 1F179, 1F17B..1F17C, 1F17F, 1F18A..1F18D, 1F190 | 62 | L2/09-064 | | Scherer, Markus (2009-01-29), Request to change some ARIB/AMD6 character names and a code point |
| 5.2 | U+1F100..1F10A, 1F110..1F12D, 1F131, 1F13D, 1F13F, 1F142, 1F146, 1F14A..1F14E, 1F157, 1F15F, 1F179, 1F17B..1F17C, 1F17F, 1F18A..1F18D, 1F190 | 62 | L2/09-003R | | Moore, Lisa (2009-02-12), "D.3", UTC #118 / L2 #215 Minutes |
| 5.2 | U+1F100..1F10A, 1F110..1F12D, 1F131, 1F13D, 1F13F, 1F142, 1F146, 1F14A..1F14E, 1F157, 1F15F, 1F179, 1F17B..1F17C, 1F17F, 1F18A..1F18D, 1F190 | 62 | L2/09-234 | N3603 (pdf, doc) | Umamaheswaran, V. S. (2009-07-08), "M54.03a", Unconfirmed minutes of WG 2 meeting 54 |
| 5.2 | U+1F100..1F10A, 1F110..1F12D, 1F131, 1F13D, 1F13F, 1F142, 1F146, 1F14A..1F14E, 1F157, 1F15F, 1F179, 1F17B..1F17C, 1F17F, 1F18A..1F18D, 1F190 | 62 | L2/09-104 | | Moore, Lisa (2009-05-20), "Motion 119-M3", UTC #119 / L2 #216 Minutes, "Give U+1F110..U+1F129 a casing relationship with the chars U+249C..U+24B5 in Unicode 5.2." |
| 5.2 | U+1F100..1F10A, 1F110..1F12D, 1F131, 1F13D, 1F13F, 1F142, 1F146, 1F14A..1F14E, 1F157, 1F15F, 1F179, 1F17B..1F17C, 1F17F, 1F18A..1F18D, 1F190 | 62 | L2/11-438 (Note: See also L2/10-458, L2/11-414, L2/11-415, and L2/11-429) (Note: Refer to the history section of the Miscellaneous Symbols and Pictographs block for additional emoji-related documents) | N4182 | Edberg, Peter (2011-12-22), Emoji Variation Sequences (Revision of L2/11-429) |
| 5.2 | U+1F100..1F10A, 1F110..1F12D, 1F131, 1F13D, 1F13F, 1F142, 1F146, 1F14A..1F14E, 1F157, 1F15F, 1F179, 1F17B..1F17C, 1F17F, 1F18A..1F18D, 1F190 | 62 | L2/13-058 | | Moore, Lisa (2013-06-12), "Consensus 135-C10", UTC #135 Minutes, "Make the characters in three ranges: 1F130..1F149, 1F150..1F169, and 1F170..1F189 Uppercase=YES by adding to "Other_Uppercase" for Unicode 6.3." |
| 5.2 | U+1F100..1F10A, 1F110..1F12D, 1F131, 1F13D, 1F13F, 1F142, 1F146, 1F14A..1F14E, 1F157, 1F15F, 1F179, 1F17B..1F17C, 1F17F, 1F18A..1F18D, 1F190 | 62 | L2/13-200 | | Moore, Lisa (2013-11-18), "Consensus 137-C6", UTC #137 Minutes, "Change the decorated letters: 1F130..1F149, 1F150..1F169, 1F170..1F189 to be Uppercase and Alphabetic, for Unicode 7.0." |
| 5.2 | U+1F12E | 1 | L2/09-003R | | Moore, Lisa (2009-02-12), "D.5", UTC #118 / L2 #215 Minutes |
| 5.2 | U+1F12E | 1 | L2/09-034R | N3579 | Pentzlin, Karl (2009-02-27), Proposal to encode a German trademark symbol in the UCS |
| 5.2 | U+1F12E | 1 | L2/09-234 | N3603 (pdf, doc) | Umamaheswaran, V. S. (2009-07-08), "M54.03c", Unconfirmed minutes of WG 2 meeting 54 |
| 6.0 | U+1F130, 1F132..1F13C, 1F13E, 1F140..1F141, 1F143..1F145, 1F147..1F149, 1F14F..1F156, 1F158..1F15E, 1F160..1F169, 1F172..1F178, 1F17A, 1F17D, 1F180..1F189, 1F18F | 66 | L2/09-234 | N3603 (pdf, doc) | Umamaheswaran, V. S. (2009-07-08), "M54.03b", Unconfirmed minutes of WG 2 meeting 54 |
| 6.0 | U+1F130, 1F132..1F13C, 1F13E, 1F140..1F141, 1F143..1F145, 1F147..1F149, 1F14F..1F156, 1F158..1F15E, 1F160..1F169, 1F172..1F178, 1F17A, 1F17D, 1F180..1F189, 1F18F | 66 | L2/09-295 | N3671 | Everson, Michael (2009-09-16), Proposal to encode additional enclosed Latin alphabetic characters |
| 6.0 | U+1F130, 1F132..1F13C, 1F13E, 1F140..1F141, 1F143..1F145, 1F147..1F149, 1F14F..1F156, 1F158..1F15E, 1F160..1F169, 1F172..1F178, 1F17A, 1F17D, 1F180..1F189, 1F18F | 66 | | N3703 (pdf, doc) | Umamaheswaran, V. S. (2010-04-13), "M55.6", Unconfirmed minutes of WG 2 meeting no. 55, Tokyo 2009-10-26/30 |
| 6.0 | U+1F130, 1F132..1F13C, 1F13E, 1F140..1F141, 1F143..1F145, 1F147..1F149, 1F14F..1F156, 1F158..1F15E, 1F160..1F169, 1F172..1F178, 1F17A, 1F17D, 1F180..1F189, 1F18F | 66 | L2/09-335R | | Moore, Lisa (2009-11-10), "Consensus 121-C12", UTC #121 / L2 #218 Minutes |
| 6.0 | U+1F130, 1F132..1F13C, 1F13E, 1F140..1F141, 1F143..1F145, 1F147..1F149, 1F14F..1F156, 1F158..1F15E, 1F160..1F169, 1F172..1F178, 1F17A, 1F17D, 1F180..1F189, 1F18F | 66 | L2/13-058 | | Moore, Lisa (2013-06-12), "Consensus 135-C10", UTC #135 Minutes, "Make the characters in three ranges: 1F130..1F149, 1F150..1F169, and 1F170..1F189 Uppercase=YES by adding to "Other_Uppercase" for Unicode 6.3." |
| 6.0 | U+1F130, 1F132..1F13C, 1F13E, 1F140..1F141, 1F143..1F145, 1F147..1F149, 1F14F..1F156, 1F158..1F15E, 1F160..1F169, 1F172..1F178, 1F17A, 1F17D, 1F180..1F189, 1F18F | 66 | L2/13-200 | | Moore, Lisa (2013-11-18), "Consensus 137-C6", UTC #137 Minutes, "Change the decorated letters: 1F130..1F149, 1F150..1F169, 1F170..1F189 to be Uppercase and Alphabetic, for Unicode 7.0." |
| 6.0 | U+1F170..1F171, 1F17E, 1F18E, 1F191..1F19A | 14 | L2/09-025R2 | N3582 (Note: Japanese translation of N3582 is available as N3621) | Scherer, Markus; Davis, Mark; Momoi, Kat; Tong, Darick; Kida, Yasuo; Edberg, Peter (2009-03-05), Proposal for Encoding Emoji Symbols |
| 6.0 | U+1F170..1F171, 1F17E, 1F18E, 1F191..1F19A | 14 | L2/09-026R | N3583 | Scherer, Markus; Davis, Mark; Momoi, Kat; Tong, Darick; Kida, Yasuo; Edberg, Peter (2009-02-06), Emoji Symbols Proposed for New Encoding |
| 6.0 | U+1F170..1F171, 1F17E, 1F18E, 1F191..1F19A | 14 | L2/09-027R2 | N3681 | Scherer, Markus (2009-09-17), Emoji Symbols: Background Data |
| 6.0 | U+1F170..1F171, 1F17E, 1F18E, 1F191..1F19A | 14 | L2/09-412 | N3722 | Suignard, Michel (2009-10-26), "Ireland T12, E7, Germany E2", Disposition of comments on SC2 N 4078 (PDAM text for Amendment 8 to ISO/IEC 10646:2003) |
| 6.0 | U+1F170..1F171, 1F17E, 1F18E, 1F191..1F19A | 14 | L2/10-132 | | Scherer, Markus; Davis, Mark; Momoi, Kat; Tong, Darick; Kida, Yasuo; Edberg, Peter (2010-04-27), Emoji Symbols: Background Data |
| 6.0 | U+1F170..1F171, 1F17E, 1F18E, 1F191..1F19A | 14 | L2/13-058 | | Moore, Lisa (2013-06-12), "Consensus 135-C10", UTC #135 Minutes, "Make the characters in three ranges: 1F130..1F149, 1F150..1F169, and 1F170..1F189 Uppercase=YES by adding to "Other_Uppercase" for Unicode 6.3." |
| 6.0 | U+1F170..1F171, 1F17E, 1F18E, 1F191..1F19A | 14 | L2/13-200 | | Moore, Lisa (2013-11-18), "Consensus 137-C6", UTC #137 Minutes, "Change the decorated letters: 1F130..1F149, 1F150..1F169, 1F170..1F189 to be Uppercase and Alphabetic, for Unicode 7.0." |
| 6.0 | U+1F170..1F171, 1F17E, 1F18E, 1F191..1F19A | 14 | L2/15-050R (Note: See also L2/13-207, L2/14-054, L2/14-063, L2/15-051A, L2/15-051B) | | Davis, Mark; et al. (2015-01-29), Additional variation selectors for emoji |
| 6.0 | U+1F170..1F171, 1F17E, 1F18E, 1F191..1F19A | 14 | L2/19-082R | | Davis, Mark (2019-05-02), QID Emoji Proposal |
| 6.0 | U+1F170..1F171, 1F17E, 1F18E, 1F191..1F19A | 14 | L2/19-124 | | McGowan, Rick (2019-04-28), Comments on Public Review Issues (January 11 - April 28, 2019) |
| 6.0 | U+1F170..1F171, 1F17E, 1F18E, 1F191..1F19A | 14 | L2/19-122 | | Moore, Lisa (2019-05-08), "Action Item 159-A83", UTC #159 Minutes, "Prepare a working draft for a proposed update of UTS #51, based on L2/19-082R for the next UTC meeting." |
| 6.0 | U+1F170..1F171, 1F17E, 1F18E, 1F191..1F19A | 14 | L2/19-203R2 | | Davis, Mark; Edberg, Peter (2019-07-04), "C.2 QID Emoji Tag Sequences", Working Draft for Proposed Update UTS #51, Unicode Emoji |
| 6.0 | U+1F170..1F171, 1F17E, 1F18E, 1F191..1F19A | 14 | L2/19-272 | | McGowan, Rick (2019-07-23), Comments on Public Review Issues (April 28, 2019 - July 23, 2019) |
| 6.0 | U+1F170..1F171, 1F17E, 1F18E, 1F191..1F19A | 14 | L2/19-292R4 | | Davis, Mark (2019-07-25), "9. General Feedback", ESC Recommendations for 2019Q3 UTC |
| 6.0 | U+1F1E6..1F1FF | 26 | L2/09-007 | | Lommel, Arle (2008-12-26), Comparison of Emoticons from Major Vendors |
| 6.0 | U+1F1E6..1F1FF | 26 | L2/09-025R2 | N3582 | Scherer, Markus; Davis, Mark; Momoi, Kat; Tong, Darick; Kida, Yasuo; Edberg, Peter (2009-03-05), Proposal for Encoding Emoji Symbols |
| 6.0 | U+1F1E6..1F1FF | 26 | L2/09-026R | N3583 | Scherer, Markus; Davis, Mark; Momoi, Kat; Tong, Darick; Kida, Yasuo; Edberg, Peter (2009-02-06), Emoji Symbols Proposed for New Encoding |
| 6.0 | U+1F1E6..1F1FF | 26 | L2/09-027R2 | N3681 | Scherer, Markus (2009-09-17), Emoji Symbols: Background Data |
| 6.0 | U+1F1E6..1F1FF | 26 | L2/09-114 | N3607 | Towards an encoding of symbol characters used as emoji, 2009-04-06 |
| 6.0 | U+1F1E6..1F1FF | 26 | L2/09-153 | N3636 | Constable, Peter (2009-04-22), "17", Emoji ad-hoc meeting report |
| 6.0 | U+1F1E6..1F1FF | 26 | L2/09-234 | N3603 (pdf, doc) | Umamaheswaran, V. S. (2009-07-08), "M54.12", Unconfirmed minutes of WG 2 meeting 54 |
| 6.0 | U+1F1E6..1F1FF | 26 | L2/09-318 | N3680 | Everson, Michael; et al. (2009-09-18), Proposal to encode Symbols for ISO 3166 Two-letter Codes in the UCS |
| 6.0 | U+1F1E6..1F1FF | 26 | L2/09-412 | N3722 | Suignard, Michel (2009-10-26), "Germany T23", Disposition of comments on SC2 N 4078 (PDAM text for Amendment 8 to ISO/IEC 10646:2003) |
| 6.0 | U+1F1E6..1F1FF | 26 | | N3703 (pdf, doc) | Umamaheswaran, V. S. (2010-04-13), "M55.3", Unconfirmed minutes of WG 2 meeting no. 55, Tokyo 2009-10-26/30 |
| 6.0 | U+1F1E6..1F1FF | 26 | L2/09-379 | N3727 | Everson, Michael; Whistler, Ken (2009-11-01), Proposal to Encode Regional Indicator Symbols in the UCS |
| 6.0 | U+1F1E6..1F1FF | 26 | L2/09-335R | | Moore, Lisa (2009-11-10), "Consensus 121-C11", UTC #121 / L2 #218 Minutes |
| 6.0 | U+1F1E6..1F1FF | 26 | L2/10-061R | | Scherer, Markus; et al. (2010-02-04), "1", Emoji: Review of FPDAM8 |
| 6.0 | U+1F1E6..1F1FF | 26 | L2/10-066 | N3790-ANSI | Anderson, Deborah (2010-02-05), "T.5", ANSI (U.S.) NB Comments on FPDAM 8 |
| 6.0 | U+1F1E6..1F1FF | 26 | | N3779 | Proposal on use of ZERO WIDTH JOINER (ZWJ) between two Regional Indicator Symbols, 2010-03-03 |
| 6.0 | U+1F1E6..1F1FF | 26 | L2/10-137 | N3828 | Suignard, Michel (2010-04-22), "JP.T6, USA T.5", Disposition of comments on SC2 N 4123 (FPDAM text for Amendment 8 to ISO/IEC 10646:2003) |
| 6.0 | U+1F1E6..1F1FF | 26 | L2/10-132 | | Scherer, Markus; Davis, Mark; Momoi, Kat; Tong, Darick; Kida, Yasuo; Edberg, Peter (2010-04-27), Emoji Symbols: Background Data |
| 6.0 | U+1F1E6..1F1FF | 26 | L2/11-414 | | Edberg, Peter; et al. (2011-10-30), "C.3", Emoji Variation Sequences |
| 6.0 | U+1F1E6..1F1FF | 26 | L2/12-284R3 | | Scherer, Markus; Davis, Mark; Heninger, Andy (2012-08-02), Segmentation of Regional Indicator Symbols |
| 6.0 | U+1F1E6..1F1FF | 26 | L2/15-145R | | Edberg, Peter (2015-05-07), Proposal for additional regional indicator symbols |
| 6.0 | U+1F1E6..1F1FF | 26 | L2/23-162 | | Daniel, Jennifer (2023-07-18), "ID20230523142756 [flag sequence CQ for Sark]", Emoji Subcommittee Report for UTC #176 (2023Q3) |
| 6.0 | U+1F1E6..1F1FF | 26 | L2/23-157 | | Constable, Peter (2023-07-31), "Action Item 176-A6", UTC #176 Minutes, "Add 1F1E8 1F1F6 as a new RGI_Emoji_Flag_Sequence in the emoji-sequences.txt data file [flag sequence CQ for Sark]" |
| 6.1 | U+1F16A..1F16B | 2 | L2/09-035 | | Blaise, Alexander (2009-01-25), Proposal to encode a modifier letter "C" for Canadian legal use in the UCS |
| 6.1 | U+1F16A..1F16B | 2 | L2/09-003R | | Moore, Lisa (2009-02-12), "B.15.13", UTC #118 / L2 #215 Minutes |
| 6.1 | U+1F16A..1F16B | 2 | L2/10-108 | | Moore, Lisa (2010-05-19), "C.22", UTC #123 / L2 #220 Minutes |
| 6.1 | U+1F16A..1F16B | 2 | L2/10-079R | N3860 | Pentzlin, Karl (2010-06-11), Proposal to encode two Letterlike Symbols for Canadian legal use in the UCS |
| 6.1 | U+1F16A..1F16B | 2 | | N3903 (pdf, doc) | "M57.02d", Unconfirmed minutes of WG2 meeting 57, 2011-03-31 |
| 7.0 | U+1F10B..1F10C | 2 | L2/11-052R | | Suignard, Michel (2011-02-15), Wingdings and Webdings symbols - Preliminary study |
| 7.0 | U+1F10B..1F10C | 2 | L2/11-149 | | Suignard, Michel (2011-05-09), Proposal to add Wingdings and Webdings symbols |
| 7.0 | U+1F10B..1F10C | 2 | L2/11-196 | N4022 | Suignard, Michel (2011-05-21), Revised Wingdings proposal |
| 7.0 | U+1F10B..1F10C | 2 | L2/11-247 | N4115 | Suignard, Michel (2011-06-08), Proposal to add Wingdings and Webdings Symbols |
| 7.0 | U+1F10B..1F10C | 2 | L2/11-344 | N4143 | Suignard, Michel (2011-09-28), Updated proposal to add Wingdings and Webdings Symbols |
| 7.0 | U+1F10B..1F10C | 2 | | N4103 | "10.2.1 Wingdings/Webdings additions", Unconfirmed minutes of WG 2 meeting 58, 2012-01-03 |
| 7.0 | U+1F10B..1F10C | 2 | L2/12-130 | N4239 | Suignard, Michel (2012-05-08), Disposition of comments on SC2 N 4201 (PDAM text for Amendment 1.2 to ISO/IEC 10646 3rd edition) |
| 7.0 | U+1F10B..1F10C | 2 | | N4363 | Suignard, Michel (2012-10-13), Status of encoding of Wingdings and Webdings Symbols |
| 7.0 | U+1F10B..1F10C | 2 | L2/12-368 | N4384 | Suignard, Michel (2012-11-06), Status of encoding of Wingdings and Webdings Symbols |
| 7.0 | U+1F10B..1F10C | 2 | L2/12-086 | N4223 | Requests regarding the Wingdings/Webdings characters in ISO/IEC 10646 PDAM 1.2, 2012-12-27 |
| 9.0 | U+1F19B..1F1AC | 18 | L2/15-238 | N4671 | Proposal to include additional Japanese TV symbols to ISO/IEC 10646, 2015-07-23 |
| 9.0 | U+1F19B..1F1AC | 18 | L2/15-312 | | Anderson, Deborah; Whistler, Ken; McGowan, Rick; Pournader, Roozbeh; Glass, Andrew; Iancu, Laurențiu (2015-11-01), "10. Japanese TV symbols", Recommendations to UTC #145 November 2015 on Script Proposals |
| 9.0 | U+1F19B..1F1AC | 18 | L2/15-254 | | Moore, Lisa (2015-11-16), "Consensus 145-C30", UTC #145 Minutes, "Accept U+1F23B plus the list of 18 ARIB symbols based on the consent docket L2/15-270, for encoding in Unicode 9.0." |
| 9.0 | U+1F19B..1F1AC | 18 | | N4739 | "M64.06", Unconfirmed minutes of WG 2 meeting 64, 2016-08-31 |
| 11.0 | U+1F12F | 1 | L2/16-059R | | Faulks, David (2016-02-23), Proposal to add the Copyleft Symbol to Unicode |
| 11.0 | U+1F12F | 1 | L2/16-156 | | Anderson, Deborah; Whistler, Ken; Pournader, Roozbeh; Glass, Andrew; Iancu, Laurențiu (2016-05-06), "14. Copyleft Symbol", Recommendations to UTC #147 May 2016 on Script Proposals |
| 11.0 | U+1F12F | 1 | L2/16-121 | | Moore, Lisa (2016-05-20), "E.2", UTC #147 Minutes |
| 11.0 | U+1F12F | 1 | L2/16-203 | | Moore, Lisa (2016-08-18), "B.11.5.1.1", UTC #148 Minutes |
| 11.0 | U+1F12F | 1 | L2/17-161 | N4794 | Suignard, Michel (2017-05-08), "USA TE.1. Enclosed Alphanumeric Supplement", Draft disposition of comments on PDAM1.2 to ISO/IEC 10646 5th edition |
| 12.0 | U+1F16C | 1 | L2/17-066R | N4821 | Silva, Eduardo Marín (2017-03-01), Proposal to encode the Marca Registrada sign |
| 12.0 | U+1F16C | 1 | L2/17-153 | | Anderson, Deborah (2017-05-17), "17. MR Sign", Recommendations to UTC #151 May 2017 on Script Proposals |
| 12.0 | U+1F16C | 1 | L2/17-103 | | Moore, Lisa (2017-05-18), "E.3", UTC #151 Minutes |
| 13.0 | U+1F10D..1F10F, 1F16D..1F16F | 6 | L2/16-283 | | Park, Jane (2016-10-18), A proposal to encode Creative Commons license and public domain icons in UCS |
| 13.0 | U+1F10D..1F10F, 1F16D..1F16F | 6 | L2/17-242R3 | N4934 | Proposal to add CC license symbols to the UCS, 2018-02-28 |
| 13.0 | U+1F10D..1F10F, 1F16D..1F16F | 6 | L2/18-115 | | Moore, Lisa (2018-05-09), "Consensus 155-C13", UTC #155 Minutes, "Change U+2B74 CIRCLED COUNTERCLOCKWISE ARROW to U+1F10E and change U+2B75 CIRCLED DOLLAR SIGN WITH OVERLAID BACKSLASH to U+1F10F." |
| 13.0 | U+1F10D..1F10F, 1F16D..1F16F | 6 | L2/18-180 | | Silva, Eduardo Marín (2018-05-10), Feedback on the name and disunification of Creative Commons characters |
| 13.0 | U+1F10D..1F10F, 1F16D..1F16F | 6 | L2/18-183 | | Moore, Lisa (2018-11-20), "Consensus 156-C22", UTC #156 Minutes, "Change the name of U+1F10E to CIRCLED ANTICLOCKWISE ARROW" |
| 13.0 | U+1F10D..1F10F, 1F16D..1F16F | 6 | | N5020 (pdf, doc) | Umamaheswaran, V. S. (2019-01-11), "10.3.7", Unconfirmed minutes of WG 2 meeting 67 |
| 13.0 | U+1F1AD | 1 | L2/18-339R | N5027 | Shirriff, Ken (2019-01-28), Proposal for addition of mask work symbol |
| 13.0 | U+1F1AD | 1 | L2/19-047 | | Anderson, Deborah; et al. (2019-01-13), "25", Recommendations to UTC #158 January 2019 on Script Proposals |
| 13.0 | U+1F1AD | 1 | L2/19-008 | | Moore, Lisa (2019-02-08), "E.5", UTC #158 Minutes |
| 18.0 | U+1F1AE | 1 | L2/24-151R | | Kojitani, Gen (2024-09-23), Proposal for two geometric shapes for Japanese traditional calendars |
| 18.0 | U+1F1AE | 1 | L2/24-165 | | Lunde, Ken (2024-07-11), "16", CJK & Unihan Working Group Recommendations for UTC #180 Meeting |
| 18.0 | U+1F1AE | 1 | L2/24-228 | | Kučera, Jan; et al. (2024-11-01), "3.4 Japanese traditional calendar symbols", Recommendations to UTC #181 (November 2024) on Script Proposals |
| 18.0 | U+1F1AE | 1 | L2/24-221 | | Constable, Peter (2024-11-12), "Consensus 181-C40", UTC #181 Minutes, "Provisionally assign ... U+1F1AE TOMOBIKI SYMBOL ..." |
| 18.0 | U+1F1AE | 1 | L2/25-091R | | Kučera, Jan; et al. (2025-04-22), "5.7 TOMOBIKI location", Recommendations to UTC #183 (April 2025) on Script Proposals |
| 18.0 | U+1F1AE | 1 | L2/25-226 | | "Consensus 185-C40", UTC #185 Minutes, 2025-10-29, "UTC accepts for encoding in Unicode 18.0 ..." |

== See also ==
- Enclosed Alphanumerics (Unicode block)
