= Copyright notice =

Notice to inform consumers of claimed copyright ownership

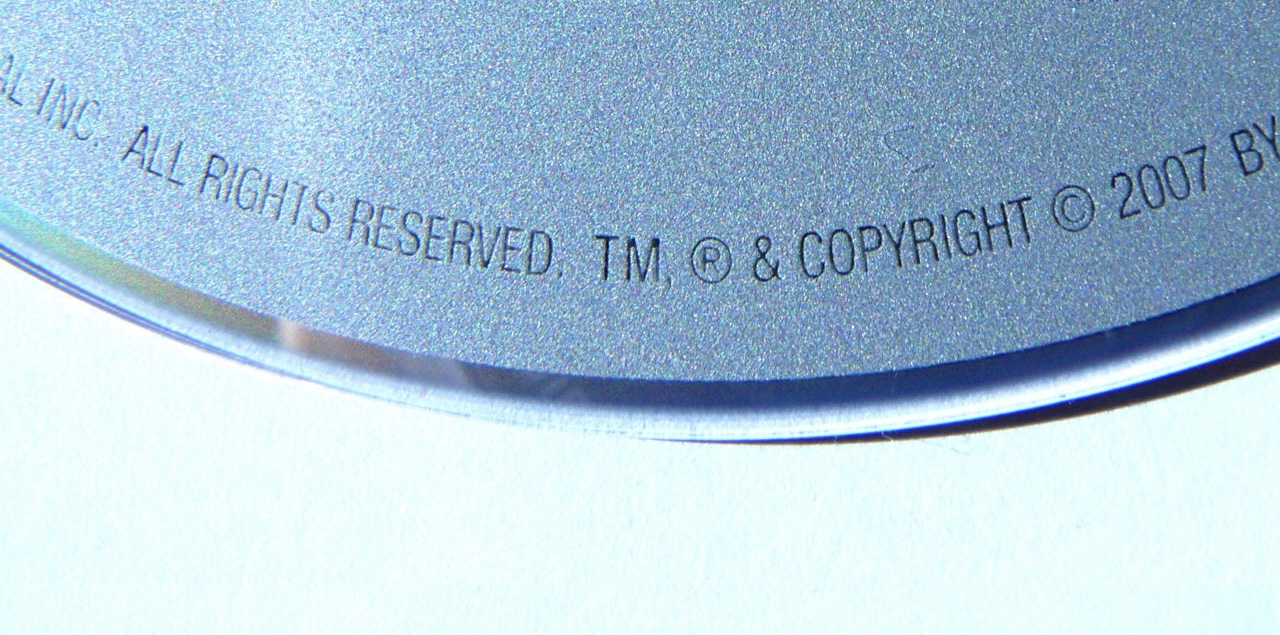
DVD: All rights reserved

In United States copyright law, a copyright notice is a notice of statutorily prescribed form for users of a published work.

Copyright is a form of protection provided by U.S. law to authors of "original works of authorship". When a work is published under the authority of the copyright owner, a notice of copyright may be placed on all publicly distributed copies or phonorecords. The use of the notice is the responsibility of the copyright owner and does not require permission from, or registration with, the Copyright Office.

Use of the notice informs the public that a work is protected by copyright, identifies the copyright owner, and shows the year of first publication. Furthermore, in the event that a work is infringed, if the work carries a proper notice, the court will not give any weight to a defendant's use of an innocent infringement defense—that is, to a claim that the defendant did not realize that the work was protected. An innocent infringement defense can result in a reduction in damages that the copyright owner would otherwise receive.

U.S. law no longer requires this, although placing it on a work does confer certain benefits to the copyright holder. Prior law did, however, require a notice, and the use of a notice is still relevant to the copyright status of older works.

For works first published on or after March 1, 1989, use of the copyright notice is optional. Before March 1, 1989, the use of the notice was mandatory on all published works. Omitting the notice on any work first published from January 1, 1978, to February 28, 1989, could have resulted in the loss of copyright protection if corrective steps were not taken within a certain amount of time. Works published before January 1, 1978, are governed by the 1909 Copyright Act. Under that law, if a work was published under the copyright owner's authority without a proper notice of copyright, all copyright protection for that work was permanently lost in the United States.

== Form of notice ==
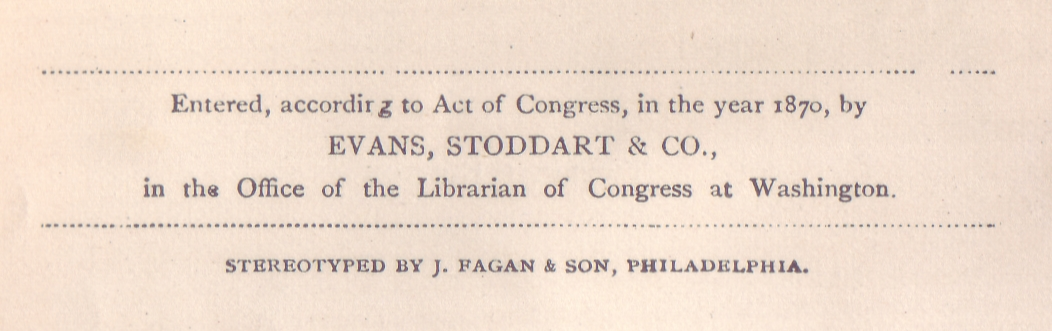
A copyright notice from a 19th-century book published in the United States

Section 401 of the Copyright Act specifies the form and location of the copyright notice. The form used for "visually perceptible" copies—that is, copies that can be seen or read, either directly (such as books) or with the aid of a machine (such as films)—differs from the form used for phonorecords of sound recordings (such as compact discs or cassettes).

=== Form of notice for visually perceptible copies ===
The notice for visually perceptible copies should contain all three elements described below. They should appear together or in close proximity on the copies.

1. The symbol © (letter C in a circle); the word "Copyright"; or the abbreviation "Copr."
2. The year of first publication. If the work is a derivative work or a compilation incorporating previously published material, the year date of first publication of the derivative work or compilation is sufficient. Examples of derivative works are translations or dramatizations; an example of a compilation is an anthology. The year may be omitted when a pictorial, graphic, or sculptural work, with accompanying textual matter, if any, is reproduced in or on greeting cards, postcards, stationery, jewelry, dolls, toys, or useful articles.
3. The name of the copyright owner, an abbreviation by which the name can be recognized, or a generally known alternative designation of owner.

Example: © 2012 Jane Doe

The "C in a circle" notice is used only on "visually perceptible" copies. Certain kinds of works, such as musical, dramatic, and literary works, may be fixed not in "copies" but by means of sound in an audio recording. Since audio recordings such as audiotapes and phonograph discs are "phonorecords" and not "copies," the "C in a circle" notice is not used to indicate protection of the underlying musical, dramatic, or literary work that is recorded.

=== Form of notice for phonorecords of sound recordings ===
The copyright notice for phonorecords embodying a sound recording is different from that for other works. Sound recordings are defined as "works that result from the fixation of a series of musical, spoken or other sounds, but not including the sounds accompanying a motion picture or other audio visual work." Copyright in a sound recording protects the particular series of sounds fixed in the recording against unauthorized reproduction, revision, and distribution. This copyright is distinct from the copyright of the musical, literary, or dramatic work that may be recorded on the phonorecord.

Phonorecords can be phonograph records (such as LPs and 45s), audiotapes, cassettes, or discs. The notice should contain the following three elements appearing together on the phonorecord.

1. The symbol ℗ (the letter P in a circle).
2. The year of first publication of the sound recording.
3. The name of the copyright owner of the sound recording, an abbreviation by which the name can be recognized, or a generally known alternative designation of the owner. If the producer of the sound recording is named on the phonorecord label or container and if no other name appears in conjunction with the notice, the producer's name will be considered a part of the notice.

Example: ℗ 2012 X.Y.Z. Records, Inc.

== Location of notice ==
The Copyright Office has issued regulations concerning the position of the notice and methods of affixation. Generally, the copyright notice should be placed on copies or phono records in such a way that it gives reasonable notice of the claim of copyright. The notice should be permanently legible to an ordinary user of the work under normal conditions of use and should not be concealed from view upon reasonable examination.

== Reasons to include an optional copyright notice ==
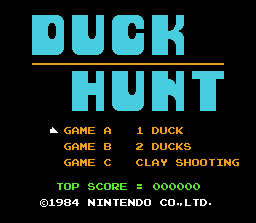
Most commercial video games, such as Duck Hunt, released in 1985 in America, postdate the legal requirement of a copyright notice for protection, but still typically include one for informational purposes and additional legal protections.

A copyright notice may still be used as a deterrent against infringement, or as a notice that the owner intends on holding their claim to copyright. It is also a copyright violation, if not also a federal crime, to remove or modify copyright notice with intent to "induce, enable, facilitate, or conceal an infringement". Also worth noting is that copyright notice has never been required on "unpublished" works, the copyright of which may last for well over 100 years. A copyright notice also gives a clear statement of ownership and date of publication, in the event of a work for hire or collaborative effort; explicitly stating the copyright claimant can reduce disputes over ownership, while explicitly stating the year of publication can (particularly in the cases of works claimed by corporations) make it clear when said copyright expires, thereby reducing the chances of the work being orphaned and left in a legal limbo.

Inclusion of a proper copyright notice on the originals is also evidence that the copyright owners may use to defeat a defense of "innocent infringement", to avoid "statutory damages", other than in certain cases claiming a "fair use" defense.

== Foreign works published in the US without copyright notice ==
Certain foreign works published in the US without copyright notice prior to 1989, which made them public domain, have had their copyrights "restored" under the Uruguay Round Agreements Act, provided the rights had not already expired in their country of original publication prior to 1996. This creates the anomaly that foreign works from 1929 to 1989 may be afforded more US copyright protection than domestic US works published in that same period, even though they were both published without any copyright notice.

== Technical requirements ==
International copyright symbol

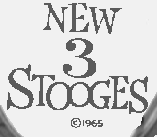
An incomplete copyright notice. Because multiple parties were involved in the production of The New 3 Stooges, failure to specify the claimant thrust the series into the public domain.

Certain information are needed on notices.

Under the 1870 law, in effect until 1909, the copyright owner had to write "Entered according to act of Congress, in the year _________________, by A. B., in the office of the Librarian of Congress, at Washington." Starting in 1874, the copyright owner could also write "Copyright, 18_________________, by A. B."

Under the 1909 law, in effect until 1978, the notice for printed literary, musical, or dramatics works had to contain the name of the author, the year, and "Copyright" or "Copr." Other works did not need to include the year and could use the © symbol. In books or other printed works, the notice were required to have appeared on the title page or the page immediately following the title page.

Under the 1978 US law, a copyright notice needed a copyright symbol year, and claimant. According to US copyright law the copyright notice must be affixed and positioned to give "reasonable notice of the claim of copyright".

There are slightly different technical requirements for copyright notice on phonographic recordings, specifically using a sound recording copyright symbol ("℗") instead of the "©" symbol.

On March 1, 1989, use of copyright notices in the United States became optional.

== Overstatement of rights ==
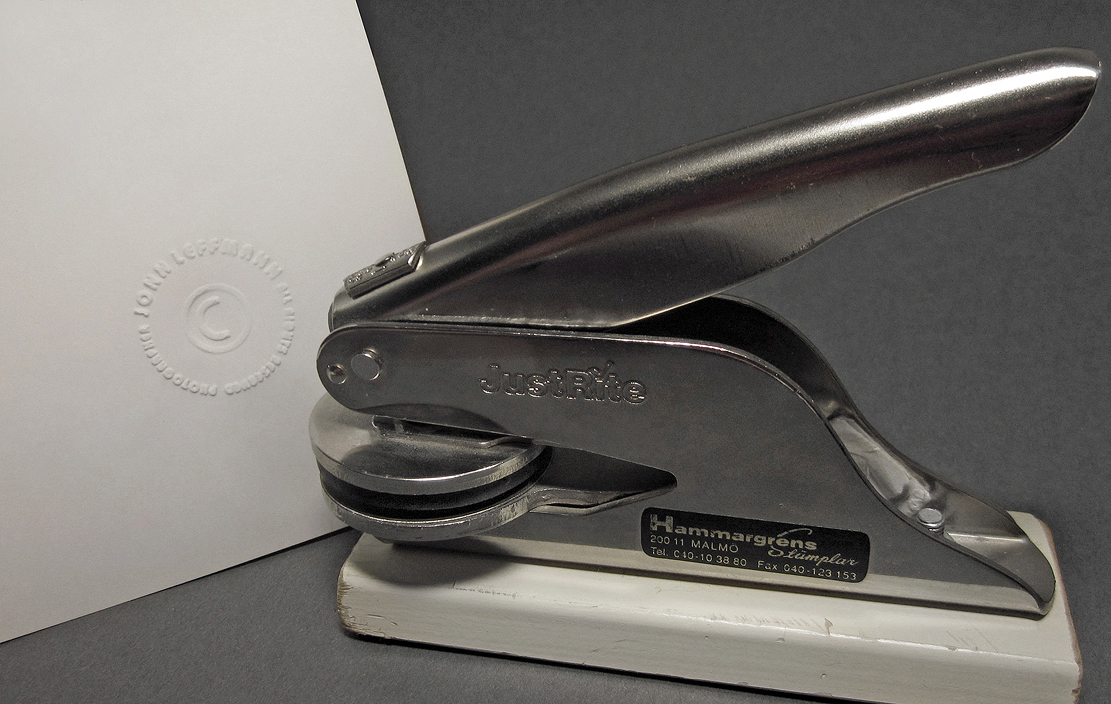
A photographer's embossed copyright notice

Legal scholar Wendy Seltzer has pointed out how many organizations overstate their rights in their copyright notices. For her law class in 2007, Seltzer copied the televised copyright notice of the NFL, during Super Bowl XLI, using her rights under fair use. She then posted this snippet to YouTube. The NFL sent an official DMCA request to YouTube that the recording be removed. Seltzer, who had expected this, challenged the takedown, and the snippet was restored. Seltzer has also posted the overreaching claims of Major League Baseball.

== See also ==
- Anti-copyright notice
- Copyfraud
- Copyleft
- Copyright formalities
- Enclosed C
