= Copyright symbol =

©o

Copyright sign
- In Unicode: U+00A9 © COPYRIGHT SIGN (&copy;, &COPY;)

Different from
- Different from: U+24B8 Ⓒ CIRCLED LATIN CAPITAL LETTER C

Related
- See also: U+2117 ℗ SOUND RECORDING COPYRIGHT (&copysr;); U+1F12F 🄯 COPYLEFT SYMBOL

The copyright symbol, or copyright sign, © (a circled capital letter C for copyright), is the symbol used in copyright notices for works other than sound recordings. The use of the symbol is described by the Universal Copyright Convention. The symbol is widely recognized but, under the Berne Convention, is no longer required in most nations to assert a new copyright.

== US law ==
In the United States, the Berne Convention Implementation Act of 1988, effective March 1, 1989, removed the requirement for the copyright symbol from U.S. copyright law, but its presence or absence is legally significant on works published before that date, and it continues to affect remedies available to a copyright holder whose work is infringed.

=== History ===
Prior symbols indicating a work's copyright status are seen in Scottish almanacs of the 1670s; books included a printed copy of the local coat-of-arms to indicate their authenticity.

A copyright notice was first required in the U.S. by the Copyright Act of 1802. It was lengthy: "Entered according to act of Congress, in the year , by A. B., in the office of the Librarian of Congress, at Washington." In general, this notice had to appear on the copyrighted work itself, but in the case of a "work of the fine arts", such as a painting, it could instead be inscribed "on the face of the substance on which [the work of art] shall be mounted". The Copyright Act was amended in 1874 to allow a much shortened notice: "Copyright, 18 , by A. B."

The copyright symbol © was introduced in the United States in section 18 of the Copyright Act of 1909, and initially applied only to pictorial, graphic and sculptural works. The Copyright Act of 1909 was meant to be a complete rewrite and overhaul of existing copyright law. As originally proposed in the draft of the bill, copyright protection required putting the word "copyright" or a sanctioned abbreviation on the work of art itself. This included paintings, the argument being that the frame was detachable. In conference sessions among copyright stakeholders on the proposed bill, conducted in 1905 and 1906, representatives of artist organizations objected to this requirement, wishing to put no more on the work itself than the artist's name. As a compromise, the possibility was created to add a relatively unintrusive mark, the capital letter C within a circle, to appear on the work itself next to the artist's name, indicating the existence of a more elaborate copyright notice elsewhere that was still to be allowed to be placed on the mounting. Indeed, the version of the bill that was submitted to Congress in 1906, compiled by the Copyright Commission under the direction of the Librarian of Congress, Herbert Putnam, contained a provision that a special copyright symbol, the letter C enclosed within a circle, could be used instead of the word "copyright" or the abbreviation "copr.", but only for a limited category of copyrightable works, including works of art but not ordinary books or periodicals.

The formulation of the 1909 Act was left unchanged when it was incorporated in 1946 as title 17 of the United States Code.

A 1954 amendment to the law extended the use of the symbol to any published copyrighted work: the symbol was allowed as an alternative to "Copyright" or "Copr." in all copyright notices.

=== US copyright notice ===
In the United States, the copyright notice consists of:

- "©" or the word "Copyright" or abbreviation "Copr.";
- the year of first publication of the copyrighted work; and
- identification of the owner of the copyright, either by name, abbreviation, or other designation by which they are generally known.

For example, for a work by "John Doe" first published in 2011: © 2011 John Doe

The notice was once required in order to receive copyright protection in the United States, but in countries respecting the Berne Convention this is no longer the case. The United States joined the Berne Convention effective March 1, 1989.

== Berne Convention ==
In countries party to the Berne Convention for the Protection of Literary and Artistic Works, including the United States, a copyright notice is not required to be displayed in order for copyright to be established; rather, the creation of the work automatically establishes copyright. The United States was one of the later accedents to Berne, implementing its adherence to the treaty with the Berne Convention Implementation Act of 1988, which became effective March 1, 1989, making the notice optional. However, the copyright notice remains material in one instance: a copyright infringer cannot claim innocent infringement as a partial defense to mitigate its damages where the infringer had access to a copy of the work that bore a copyright notice.

The majority of nations now belong to Berne, and thus do not require copyright notices to obtain copyright.

== Digital representation ==
The character is mapped in Unicode as U+00A9 © COPYRIGHT SIGN. Unicode also has U+24B8 Ⓒ CIRCLED LATIN CAPITAL LETTER C and U+24D2 ⓒ CIRCLED LATIN SMALL LETTER C, which have an appearance similar to the character.

=== Typing the character ===
Because the © symbol is not available on typical typewriters or in ASCII, it has long been common to approximate this symbol with the characters (c) (c in parentheses), a practice that has been accepted by the U.S. Copyright Office under both the 1909 and 1976 U.S. Copyright Acts. Word processing software with an autocorrection facility can recognise this three-character sequence and convert it automatically to a single copyright symbol.

== Related symbols ==
- The sound recording copyright symbol is the symbol ℗ (the capital letter P enclosed by a circle), and is used to designate copyright in a sound recording.
- The copyleft symbol 🄯 is a backwards capital letter C in a circle (copyright symbol © mirrored). It has no legal meaning.

== See also ==
- Copyleft – Preservation of legal rights in the reuse of a work ⟨🄯⟩
- Enclosed C – ⟨Ⓒ or ⓒ⟩
- Orthodox Union Kosher symbol (the letter "U" inside of the letter "O", which is circular)
- Registered trademark symbol – Typographical symbol (®)
- Service mark symbol – Typographical symbol (℠)
- Trademark symbol – Typographical symbol (™) ⟨™⟩
- Unicode input – Input characters using their Unicode code points
