= Radical 130 =

Chinese character radical

肉
- Radical 130 (U+2F81)
- 肉 (U+8089) "meat"

Pronunciations
- Pinyin: ròu
- Bopomofo: ㄖㄡˋ
- Gwoyeu Romatzyh: row
- Wade–Giles: jou^{4}
- Cantonese Yale: yuhk
- Jyutping: juk6
- Japanese Kana: ジク jiku / ニク niku (on'yomi) しし shishi (kun'yomi)
- Sino-Korean: 육 yuk

Names
- Chinese name(s): (Left, xin zixing) 月字旁 (⺼) 肉字旁 (⺼) 提肉旁 (Bottom) 肉字底 ròuzìpáng
- Japanese name(s): 肉/にく niku 肉月/にくづき nikuzuki
- Hangul: 고기 gogi

Stroke order animation

Radical 130 or radical meat (肉部) meaning "meat" is one of the 29 Kangxi radicals (214 radicals in total) composed of 6 strokes. When used as a left component, the radical character transforms into 月 in Simplified Chinese and Japanese or ⺼ in modern Traditional Chinese used in Hong Kong and Taiwan.

In the Kangxi Dictionary, there are 674 characters (out of 49,030) to be found under this radical.

肉 is also the 132nd indexing component in the Table of Indexing Chinese Character Components predominantly adopted by Simplified Chinese dictionaries published in mainland China.

== Evolution ==
Shang dynasty Oracle bone script

Western Zhou Bronze script

Chu slip and silk script

Qin slip script

Large seal script character

Small seal script character

Clerical script

== Derived characters ==
Strokes	Characters
+0	肉 ⺼↔月
+1	肊 (=臆)
+2	肋 肌 肍 肎 (=肯) 肏
+3	肐 (=胳) 肑 肒 肓 肔 肕 肖 肗 肘 肙 肚 肛 肜 肝 肞 肟 肠^{SC} (=腸)
+4	股 肢 肣 肤^{SC} (=膚) 肥 肦 (=頒 -> 頁) 肧 (=胚) 肨 肩 肪 肫 肬 (=疣 -> 疒) 肭 肮^{SC} (=骯 -> 骨) 肯 肰 肱 育 肳 肴^{SC} (=餚 -> 食) 肵 肶 肷 肸 肹 肺 肻 (=肯) 肼 肽 肾^{SC} (=腎) 肿^{SC} (=腫) 胀^{SC} (=脹) 胁^{SC} (=脅)
+5	朑 胂 胃 胄 胅 胆^{SC} (=膽) 胇 胈 胉 胊 胋 背 胍 胎 胏 胐 胑 (=肢) 胒 胓 胔 胕 胖 胗 胘 胙 胚 胛 胜^{SC} (=勝 -> 力) 胝 胞 胟 胠 胡 胢 胣 胤 胥 胦 胧^{SC} (=朧 -> 月) 胨^{SC} (=腖) 胩 胪^{SC} (=臚) 胫^{SC} (=脛) 胬 脉^{SC} (=脈)
+6	胭 胮 胯 胰 胱 胲 胳 胴 胵 胶^{SC} (=膠) 胷 (=胸) 胸 胹 胺 胻 胼 能 胾 胿 脀 脁 脂 脃 (=脆) 脄 脅 脆 脇 脈 脊 脋 脌 (=𢆡 -> 乙) 脍^{SC} (=膾) 脎 脏^{SC} (=髒 -> 骨) 脐^{SC} (=臍) 脑^{SC} (=腦) 脒 脓^{SC} (=膿) 脔^{SC} (=臠)
+7	脕 脖 脗 (=吻 -> 口) 脘 脙 脚^{SC/JP} (=腳) 脛 脜 脝 脞 脟 脠 脡 脢 脣 脤 脥 脦 脧 脨 脩 脪 脫 脬 脭 脮 脯 脰 脱^{SC/JP} (=脫) 脲 脳^{JP} (=腦) 脴 脵 脶^{SC} (=腡) 脷 脸^{SC} (=臉)
+8	脹 脺 脻 脼 脽 脾 脿 (=膘 / 俵 -> 人 / 婊 -> 女) 腀 腁 (=胼) 腂 腃 腄 腅 腆 腇 腈 腉 腊 (also SC form of 臘) 腋 腌 腍 腎 腏 (=餟 -> 食) 腐 腑 腒 腓 腔 腕 腖 腗 (=脾) 腘^{SC} (=膕) 腙 腚
+9	幐 朡 腛 腜 腝 腞 腟 (=膣) 腠 腡 腢 腣 腤 腥 腦 腧 腨 腩 腪 腫 腬 腭^{SC} (=齶 -> 齒) 腮 腯 腰 腱 腲 腳 腴 腵 腶 腷 腸 腹 腺 腻^{SC} (=膩) 腼 腽^{SC/HK} (=膃) 腾^{SC} (=騰 -> 馬)
+10	腿 膀 膁 膂 膃 膄 膅 膆 膇 膈 膉 膊 膋 膌 膍 膎 膏 膐 (=膂) 膑^{SC} (=臏)
+11	膒 膓 (=腸) 膔 膕 膖 膗 膘 膙 膚 膛 膜 膝 膞 膟 膠 膡 膢 膣
+12	朥 膥 膦 膧 膨 膩 膪 膫 膬 膭 膮 膯 膰 膱 膲 膳 膴 膵 膶
+13	膷 膸 膹 膺 膻 膼 膽 膾 膿 臀 臁 臂 臃 臄 臅 臆 臇 臈 臉 臊 臋 (=臀) 臌
+14	臍 臎 臏 臐 臑 臒 臓^{JP} (=臟)
+15	臔 臕 (=膘) 臗 臘
+16	臖 臙^{JP} (=胭) 臚 臛 臜^{SC} (=臢)
+17	臝 (=裸 -> 衣)
+18	臞 臟
+19	臠 臡 臢

== Variant forms ==
⺼ in modern Traditional Chinese

This radical character has different forms in different languages when used as a left component. Traditionally, the writing form of the radical character as a left component is hardly distinguishable with Radical 74 (月 "moon"). In the Kangxi Dictionary, 月 which means the "moon" has its two horizontal strokes' right ends detached from the frame, while those in 月 which means "meat" are connected to the frame. In modern Japanese and Simplified Chinese, this difference no longer exists.

In modern Traditional Chinese used in Hong Kong and Taiwan, the two horizontal strokes in 月 meaning "meat" are altered to a dot and an upward horizontal stroke, a change that also applies to printing typefaces despite it historically only being used as a handwriting variant.

== Sinogram ==
The radical is also used as an independent Chinese character. It is one of the Kyōiku kanji or Kanji taught in elementary school in Japan. It is a second grade kanji

== Literature ==
- Fazzioli, Edoardo (1987). Chinese calligraphy : from pictograph to ideogram : the history of 214 essential Chinese/Japanese characters. calligraphy by Rebecca Hon Ko. New York: Abbeville Press. ISBN 0-89659-774-1.
