= ARIB STD B24 character set =

Character encoding and character set extensions used in Japanese broadcasting

ARIB STB-B24 encoding
- Standard: ARIB STB-B24 Volume 1
- Classification: ISO 2022 profile/extension
- Transforms / Encodes: ARIB STB-B24 Kanji, Kana and mosaic sets, JIS X 0201

ARIB STB-B24 Kanji set
- Weather symbols: a few of the extended symbols included.
- Languages: Japanese, English, Russian; Partial support: Greek, Chinese
- Standard: ARIB STB-B24 Volume 1
- Classification: ISO-2022-structured CJK DBCS
- Extends: JIS X 0208
- Encoding formats: ARIB STB-B24 encoding (ISO 2022 based); Shift JIS (ARIB variant)

Volume 1 of the Association of Radio Industries and Businesses (ARIB) STD-B24 standard for Broadcast Markup Language specifies, amongst other details, a character encoding for use in Japanese-language broadcasting. It was introduced on 1999-10-26. The latest revision is version 6.3 as of 2016-07-06.

It includes a number of ARIB extended characters (ARIB外字, ARIB gaiji) not found in the base standards (JIS X 0208 and JIS X 0201). It was the source standard for many symbol characters which were added to Unicode, including portions of the Miscellaneous Symbols, Enclosed Alphanumeric Supplement and Enclosed Ideographic Supplement blocks. Its contributions partially overlap the Unicode emoji, but were added a year earlier, in Unicode 5.2.

Fascicle 1 of the ARIB STD-B62 standard, published in 2014, defines Unicode mappings for a selection of the B24 extended characters (excluding, for example, those duplicated by JIS X 0213), as well as a few extended Kanji. It also includes a mapping of utilised characters outside the Basic Multilingual Plane to the BMP's private use area.

== Sets and codes ==
The ARIB STD B24 standard defines multiple character sets and a method of switching between them. These include a Kanji set (an extension of JIS X 0208), an Alphanumeric set, a Hiragana set, Katakana sets of two distinct layouts and four mosaic sets. The sets are selected using ISO 2022 mechanisms for 94-sets, using the following codes (proportional sets use the same layout as the corresponding non-proportional ones):

Set	Type	Code (column/line)	Code (hexadecimal)	Code (ASCII character)	Comments
Kanji	2-byte	4/2	42	B	The escape code B used for the ARIB Kanji set is used for the 1983 version of JIS C 6226 (JIS X 0208, of which the ARIB Kanji set is an extension) in ISO-2022-JP.
Alphanumeric	1-byte	4/10	4A	J	JIS_C6220-ro (ISO646-JP, JIS X 0201 Roman set). Similar to ASCII, with two assignments differing. Escape code J matches usage in ISO-2022-JP.
Proportional alphanumeric	1-byte	3/6	36	6	JIS_C6220-ro (ISO646-JP, JIS X 0201 Roman set). Similar to ASCII, with two assignments differing. Escape code J matches usage in ISO-2022-JP.
Hiragana	1-byte	3/0	30	0	Hiragana themselves follow the same layout as row 4 of JIS X 0208, but without a lead byte. Also adds several additional assignments for punctuation.
Proportional Hiragana	1-byte	3/7	37	7	Hiragana themselves follow the same layout as row 4 of JIS X 0208, but without a lead byte. Also adds several additional assignments for punctuation.
Katakana	1-byte	3/1	31	1	Katakana themselves follow the same layout as row 5 of JIS X 0208, but without a lead byte. Also adds several additional assignments for punctuation.
Proportional Katakana	1-byte	3/8	38	8	Katakana themselves follow the same layout as row 5 of JIS X 0208, but without a lead byte. Also adds several additional assignments for punctuation.
JIS X 0201 Katakana	1-byte	4/9	49	I	JIS_C6220-jp (JIS X 0201 Kana set). Escape code matches usage in ISO-2022-JP-3.
Mosaic A	1-byte	3/2	32	2	Pseudographics (ISO-IR-71)
Mosaic B	1-byte	3/3	33	3	Pseudographics (ISO-IR-137)
Mosaic C	1-byte	3/4	34	4	Non-spacing pseudographics (ISO-IR-71 subset with separated mosaic blocks)
Mosaic D	1-byte	3/5	35	5	Non-spacing pseudographics

== Code charts ==
=== Kanji (double-byte) set ===
This is a double-byte character set extending JIS X 0208.

==== Lead byte ====
The encoding bytes correspond to the row or cell number plus 0x20, or 32 in decimal (see below). Hence, the code set starting with 0x21 has a row number of 1, and its cell 1 has a continuation byte of 0x21 (or 33), and so forth. Most of the code corresponds to JIS X 0208.

ARIB STD-B24 Kanji (double-byte) set (lead bytes)
	0	1	2	3	4	5	6	7	8	9	A	B	C	D	E	F
2x	SP	1-_	2-_	3-_	4-_	5-_	6-_	7-_	8-_	9-_	10-_	11-_	12-_	13-_	14-_	15-_
3x	16-_	17-_	18-_	19-_	20-_	21-_	22-_	23-_	24-_	25-_	26-_	27-_	28-_	29-_	30-_	31-_
4x	32-_	33-_	34-_	35-_	36-_	37-_	38-_	39-_	40-_	41-_	42-_	43-_	44-_	45-_	46-_	47-_
5x	48-_	49-_	50-_	51-_	52-_	53-_	54-_	55-_	56-_	57-_	58-_	59-_	60-_	61-_	62-_	63-_
6x	64-_	65-_	66-_	67-_	68-_	69-_	70-_	71-_	72-_	73-_	74-_	75-_	76-_	77-_	78-_	79-_
7x	80-_	81-_	82-_	83-_	84-_	85-_	86-_	87-_	88-_	89-_	90-_	91-_	92-_	93-_	94-_	DEL
Unused lead byte Lead byte Differences from JIS X 0208

==== Character set 0x75–0x76 (row numbers 85–86, additional kanji) ====
This part is the source standard for a small number of CJK Unified Ideographs in Unicode, where it is designated with the JARIB- source prefix in the Unihan database.

ARIB STD-B24 Kanji (double-byte) set (prefixed with 0x75)
	0	1	2	3	4	5	6	7	8	9	A	B	C	D	E	F
2x		㐂 3402	𠅘 20158	份 4EFD	仿 4EFF	侚 4F9A	俉 4FC9	傜 509C	儞 511E	冼 51BC	㔟 351F	匇 5307	卡 5361	卬 536C	詹 8A79	𠮷 20BB7
3x	呍 544D	咖 5496	咜 549C	咩 54A9	唎 550E	啊 554A	噲 5672	囤 56E4	圳 5733	圴 5734	塚 FA10	墀 5880	姤 59E4	娣 5A23	婕 5A55	寬 5BEC
4x	﨑 FA11	㟢 37E2	庬 5EAC	弴 5F34	彅 5F45	德 5FB7	怗 6017	恵 FA6B	愰 6130	昤 6624	曈 66C8	曙 66D9	曺 66FA	曻 66FB	桒 6852	鿄 9FC4
5x	椑 6911	椻 693B	橅 6A45	檑 6A91	櫛 6ADB	𣏌 233CC	𣏾 233FE	𣗄 235C4	毱 6BF1	泠 6CE0	洮 6D2E	海 FA45	涿 6DBF	淊 6DCA	淸 6DF8	渚 FA46
6x	潞 6F5E	濹 6FF9	灤 7064	𤋮 FA6C	𤋮 242EE	煇 7147	燁 71C1	爀 7200	玟 739F	玨 73A8	珉 73C9	珖 73D6	琛 741B	琡 7421	琢 FA4A	琦 7426
7x	琪 742A	琬 742C	琹 7439	瑋 744B	㻚 3EDA	畵 7575	疁 7581	睲 7772	䂓 4093	磈 78C8	磠 78E0	祇 7947	禮 79AE	鿆 9FC6	䄃 4103	

ARIB STD-B24 Kanji (double-byte) set (prefixed with 0x76)
	0	1	2	3	4	5	6	7	8	9	A	B	C	D	E	F
2x		鿅 9FC5	秚 79DA	稞 7A1E	筿 7B7F	簱 7C31	䉤 4264	綋 7D8B	羡 7FA1	脘 8118	脺 813A	舘 FA6D	芮 82AE	葛 845B	蓜 84DC	蓬 84EC
3x	蕙 8559	藎 85CE	蝕 8755	蟬 87EC	蠋 880B	裵 88F5	角 89D2	諶 8AF6	跎 8DCE	辻 8FBB	迶 8FF6	郝 90DD	鄧 9127	鄭 912D	醲 91B2	鈳 9233
4x	銈 9288	錡 9321	鍈 9348	閒 9592	雞 96DE	餃 9903	饀 9940	髙 9AD9	鯖 9BD6	鷗 9DD7	麴 9EB4	麵 9EB5				
5x																
6x																
7x																

==== Character set 0x7A (row number 90, traffic symbols) ====
Characters 90-45 through 90-63 and 90-66 through 90-84 (shown below shaded) are listed in the B24 standard only in table 7-10 (the list of extension characters), and are also the only characters in rows 90 through 91 which are not transport-related symbols; this is noted in the B24 standard in an endnote to table 7-10. The remainder of the extensions are listed in both table 7-4 (the double-byte code chart) and table 7-10.

ARIB STD-B24 Kanji (double-byte) set (prefixed with 0x7A)
	0	1	2	3	4	5	6	7	8	9	A	B	C	D	E	F
2x		⛌ 26CC	⛍ 26CD	❗︎ 2757	⛏ 26CF	⛐ 26D0	⛑ 26D1		⛒ 26D2	⛕ 26D5	⛓ 26D3	⛔︎ 26D4				
3x	🅿 1F17F	🆊 1F18A			⛖ 26D6	⛗ 26D7	⛘ 26D8	⛙ 26D9	⛚ 26DA	⛛ 26DB	⛜ 26DC	⛝ 26DD	⛞ 26DE	⛟ 26DF	⛠ 26E0	⛡ 26E1
4x	⭕︎ 2B55	㉈ 3248	㉉ 3249	㉊ 324A	㉋ 324B	㉌ 324C	㉍ 324D	㉎ 324E	㉏ 324F					⒑ 2491	⒒ 2492	⒓ 2493
5x	🅊 1F14A	🅌 1F14C	🄿 1F13F	🅆 1F146	🅋 1F14B	🈐 1F210	🈑 1F211	🈒 1F212	🈓 1F213	🅂 1F142	🈔 1F214	🈕 1F215	🈖 1F216	🅍 1F14D	🄱 1F131	🄽 1F13D
6x	⬛︎ 2B1B	⬤ 2B24	🈗 1F217	🈘 1F218	🈙 1F219	🈚︎ 1F21A	🈛 1F21B	⚿ 26BF	🈜 1F21C	🈝 1F21D	🈞 1F21E	🈟 1F21F	🈠 1F220	🈡 1F221	🈢 1F222	🈣 1F223
7x	🈤 1F224	🈥 1F225	🅎 1F14E	㊙ 3299	🈀 1F200											
Additions from table 7-10 not in table 7-4.

==== Character set 0x7B (row number 91, map symbols) ====
Characters from ARIB STD-B24 which were not retained in ARIB STD-B62 are shown shaded.

ARIB STD-B24 Kanji (double-byte) set (prefixed with 0x7B)
	0	1	2	3	4	5	6	7	8	9	A	B	C	D	E	F
2x		⛣ 26E3	⭖ 2B56	⭗ 2B57	⭘ 2B58	⭙ 2B59	☓ 2613	㊋ 328B	〒 3012	⛨ 26E8	㉆ 3246	㉅ 3245	⛩ 26E9	࿖ (Note: Glossed as "temple" (i.e. Buddhist temple) in B24 table 7-10 (the list of extension characters).) 0FD6	⛪︎ 26EA	⛫ 26EB
3x	⛬ 26EC	♨ 2668	⛭ 26ED	⛮ 26EE	⛯ 26EF	⚓︎ 2693	✈ 2708	⛰ 26F0	⛱ 26F1	⛲︎ 26F2	⛳︎ 26F3	⛴ 26F4	⛵︎ 26F5	🅗 1F157	Ⓓ 24B9	Ⓢ 24C8
4x	⛶ 26F6	🅟 1F15F	🆋 1F18B	🆍 1F18D	🆌 1F18C	🅹 1F179	⛷ 26F7	⛸ 26F8	⛹ 26F9	⛺︎ 26FA	🅻 1F17B	☎ 260E	⛻ 26FB	⛼ 26FC	⛽︎ 26FD	⛾ 26FE
5x	🅼 1F17C	⛿ 26FF														
6x																
7x																
Not in ARIB STD-B62

==== Character set 0x7C (row number 92, units, enclosed forms, list markers, arrows) ====
Characters from ARIB STD-B24 which were not retained in ARIB STD-B62 are shown shaded.

ARIB STD-B24 Kanji (double-byte) set (prefixed with 0x7C)
	0	1	2	3	4	5	6	7	8	9	A	B	C	D	E	F
2x		➡ 27A1	⬅ 2B05	⬆ 2B06	⬇ 2B07	⬯ 2B2F	⬮ 2B2E	年 5E74	月 6708	日 65E5	円 5186	㎡ 33A1	㎥ 33A5	㎝ 339D	㎠ 33A0	㎤ 33A4
3x	🄀 1F100	⒈ 2488	⒉ 2489	⒊ 248A	⒋ 248B	⒌ 248C	⒍ 248D	⒎ 248E	⒏ 248F	⒐ 2490	氏 (Note: Small form (70% size per code chart / table 7-10) of a kanji character. Shown here simulated. Private Use Area code points shown are those used by the Nishiki-teki font.)	副	元	故	前	新
4x	🄁 1F101	🄂 1F102	🄃 1F103	🄄 1F104	🄅 1F105	🄆 1F106	🄇 1F107	🄈 1F108	🄉 1F109	🄊 1F10A	㈳ 3233	㈶ 3236	㈲ 3232	㈱ 3231	㈹ 3239	㉄ 3244
5x	▶ 25B6	◀ 25C0	〖 3016	〗 3017	⟐ 27D0	² 00B2	³ 00B3	🄭 1F12D	(vn) (Note: Musical abbreviation (or half thereof) not present in Unicode, simulated here with multiple characters. Private Use Area code points shown are those used by the Nishiki-teki font.)	(ob)	(cb)	(ce	mb)	(hp)	(br)	(p)
6x	(s)	(ms)	(t)	(bs)	(b)	(tb)	(tp)	(ds)	(ag)	(eg)	(vo)	(fl)	(ke	y)	(sa	x)
7x	(sy	n)	(or	g)	(pe	r)	🄬 1F12C	🄫 1F12B	㉇ 3247	🆐 1F190	🈦 1F226	℻ 213B				
Not in ARIB STD-B62

==== Character set 0x7D (row number 93, game and weather symbols, fractions, units, enclosed forms) ====
Characters from ARIB STD-B24 which were not retained in ARIB STD-B62 are shown shaded.

ARIB STD-B24 Kanji (double-byte) set (prefixed with 0x7D)
	0	1	2	3	4	5	6	7	8	9	A	B	C	D	E	F
2x		㈪ 322A	㈫ 322B	㈬ 322C	㈭ 322D	㈮ 322E	㈯ 322F	㈰ 3230	㈷ 3237	㍾ 337E	㍽ 337D	㍼ 337C	㍻ 337B	№ 2116	℡ 2121	〶 3036
3x	⚾︎ 26BE	🉀 1F240	🉁 1F241	🉂 1F242	🉃 1F243	🉄 1F244	🉅 1F245	🉆 1F246	🉇 1F247	🉈 1F248	🄪 1F12A	🈧 1F227	🈨 1F228	🈩 1F229	🈔 1F214	🈪 1F22A
4x	🈫 1F22B	🈬 1F22C	🈭 1F22D	🈮 1F22E	🈯︎ 1F22F	🈰 1F230	🈱 1F231	ℓ 2113	㎏ 338F	㎐ 3390	㏊ 33CA	㎞ 339E	㎢ 33A2	㍱ 3371		
5x	½ 00BD	↉ 2189	⅓ 2153	⅔ 2154	¼ 00BC	¾ 00BE	⅕ 2155	⅖ 2156	⅗ 2157	⅘ 2158	⅙ 2159	⅚ 215A	⅐ 2150	⅛ 215B	⅑ 2151	⅒ 2152
6x	☀ 2600	☁ 2601	☂ 2602	⛄︎ 26C4	☖ 2616	☗ 2617	⛉ 26C9	⛊ 26CA	♦ 2666	♥ 2665	♣ 2663	♠ 2660	⛋ 26CB	⨀ 2A00	‼ 203C	⁉ 2049
7x	⛅︎ 26C5	☔︎ 2614	⛆ 26C6	☃ 2603	⛇ 26C7	⚡︎ 26A1	⛈ 26C8		⚞ 269E	⚟ 269F	♬ 266C	☎ 260E				
Not in ARIB STD-B62

==== Character set 0x7E (row number 94, list markers) ====
Characters from ARIB STD-B24 which were not retained in ARIB STD-B62 are shown shaded.

ARIB STD-B24 Kanji (double-byte) set (prefixed with 0x7E)
	0	1	2	3	4	5	6	7	8	9	A	B	C	D	E	F
2x		Ⅰ 2160	Ⅱ 2161	Ⅲ 2162	Ⅳ 2163	Ⅴ 2164	Ⅵ 2165	Ⅶ 2166	Ⅷ 2167	Ⅸ 2168	Ⅹ 2169	Ⅺ 216A	Ⅻ 216B	⑰ 2470	⑱ 2471	⑲ 2472
3x	⑳ 2473	⑴ 2474	⑵ 2475	⑶ 2476	⑷ 2477	⑸ 2478	⑹ 2479	⑺ 247A	⑻ 247B	⑼ 247C	⑽ 247D	⑾ 247E	⑿ 247F	㉑ 3251	㉒ 3252	㉓ 3253
4x	㉔ 3254	🄐 1F110	🄑 1F111	🄒 1F112	🄓 1F113	🄔 1F114	🄕 1F115	🄖 1F116	🄗 1F117	🄘 1F118	🄙 1F119	🄚 1F11A	🄛 1F11B	🄜 1F11C	🄝 1F11D	🄞 1F11E
5x	🄟 1F11F	🄠 1F120	🄡 1F121	🄢 1F122	🄣 1F123	🄤 1F124	🄥 1F125	🄦 1F126	🄧 1F127	🄨 1F128	🄩 1F129	㉕ 3255	㉖ 3256	㉗ 3257	㉘ 3258	㉙ 3259
6x	㉚ 325A	① 2460	② 2461	③ 2462	④ 2463	⑤ 2464	⑥ 2465	⑦ 2466	⑧ 2467	⑨ 2468	⑩ 2469	⑪ 246A	⑫ 246B	⑬ 246C	⑭ 246D	⑮ 246E
7x	⑯ 246F	❶ 2776	❷ 2777	❸ 2778	❹ 2779	❺ 277A	❻ 277B	❼ 277C	❽ 277D	❾ 277E	❿ 277F	⓫ 24EB	⓬ 24EC	㉛ 325B		
Not in ARIB STD-B62

=== Single-byte sets ===
==== Alphanumeric set ====
ARIB STD-B24 Alphanumeric set
	0	1	2	3	4	5	6	7	8	9	A	B	C	D	E	F
2x		! 0021	" 0022	# 0023	$ 0024	% 0025	& 0026	' 0027	( 0028	) 0029	* 002A	+ 002B	, 002C	- 002D	. 002E	/ 002F
3x	0 0030	1 0031	2 0032	3 0033	4 0034	5 0035	6 0036	7 0037	8 0038	9 0039	: 003A	; 003B	< 003C	= 003D	> 003E	? 003F
4x	@ 0040	A 0041	B 0042	C 0043	D 0044	E 0045	F 0046	G 0047	H 0048	I 0049	J 004A	K 004B	L 004C	M 004D	N 004E	O 004F
5x	P 0050	Q 0051	R 0052	S 0053	T 0054	U 0055	V 0056	W 0057	X 0058	Y 0059	Z 005A	[ 005B	¥ 00A5	] 005D	005E	_ 005F
6x	` 0060	a 0061	b 0062	c 0063	d 0064	e 0065	f 0066	g 0067	h 0068	i 0069	j 006A	k 006B	l 006C	m 006D	n 006E	o 006F
7x	p 0070	q 0071	r 0072	s 0073	t 0074	u 0075	v 0076	w 0077	x 0078	y 0079	z 007A	{ 007B	| 007C	} 007D	‾ 203E	
Differences from US-ASCII

==== Hiragana set ====
ARIB STD-B24 Hiragana set
	0	1	2	3	4	5	6	7	8	9	A	B	C	D	E	F
2x		ぁ 3041	あ 3042	ぃ 3043	い 3044	ぅ 3045	う 3046	ぇ 3047	え 3048	ぉ 3049	お 304A	か 304B	が 304C	き 304D	ぎ 304E	く 304F
3x	ぐ 3050	け 3051	げ 3052	こ 3053	ご 3054	さ 3055	ざ 3056	し 3057	じ 3058	す 3059	ず 305A	せ 305B	ぜ 305C	そ 305D	ぞ 305E	た 305F
4x	だ 3060	ち 3061	ぢ 3062	っ 3063	つ 3064	づ 3065	て 3066	で 3067	と 3068	ど 3069	な 306A	に 306B	ぬ 306C	ね 306D	の 306E	は 306F
5x	ば 3070	ぱ 3071	ひ 3072	び 3073	ぴ 3074	ふ 3075	ぶ 3076	ぷ 3077	へ 3078	べ 3079	ぺ 307A	ほ 307B	ぼ 307C	ぽ 307D	ま 307E	み 307F
6x	む 3080	め 3081	も 3082	ゃ 3083	や 3084	ゅ 3085	ゆ 3086	ょ 3087	よ 3088	ら 3089	り 308A	る 308B	れ 308C	ろ 308D	ゎ 308E	わ 308F
7x	ゐ 3090	ゑ 3091	を 3092	ん 3093				ゝ 309D	ゞ 309E	ー 30FC	。 3002	「 300C	」 300D	、 3001	・ 30FB	
Character allocations not following row 4 of JIS X 0208

==== Katakana set ====
ARIB STD-B24 Katakana set
	0	1	2	3	4	5	6	7	8	9	A	B	C	D	E	F
2x		ァ 30A1	ア 30A2	ィ 30A3	イ 30A4	ゥ 30A5	ウ 30A6	ェ 30A7	エ 30A8	ォ 30A9	オ 30AA	カ 30AB	ガ 30AC	キ 30AD	ギ 30AE	ク 30AF
3x	グ 30B0	ケ 30B1	ゲ 30B2	コ 30B3	ゴ 30B4	サ 30B5	ザ 30B6	シ 30B7	ジ 30B8	ス 30B9	ズ 30BA	セ 30BB	ゼ 30BC	ソ 30BD	ゾ 30BE	タ 30BF
4x	ダ 30C0	チ 30C1	ヂ 30C2	ッ 30C3	ツ 30C4	ヅ 30C5	テ 30C6	デ 30C7	ト 30C8	ド 30C9	ナ 30CA	ニ 30CB	ヌ 30CC	ネ 30CD	ノ 30CE	ハ 30CF
5x	バ 30D0	パ 30D1	ヒ 30D2	ビ 30D3	ピ 30D4	フ 30D5	ブ 30D6	プ 30D7	ヘ 30D8	ベ 30D9	ペ 30DA	ホ 30DB	ボ 30DC	ポ 30DD	マ 30DE	ミ 30DF
6x	ム 30E0	メ 30E1	モ 30E2	ャ 30E3	ヤ 30E4	ュ 30E5	ユ 30E6	ョ 30E7	ヨ 30E8	ラ 30E9	リ 30EA	ル 30EB	レ 30EC	ロ 30ED	ヮ 30EE	ワ 30EF
7x	ヰ 30F0	ヱ 30F1	ヲ 30F2	ン 30F3	ヴ 30F4	ヵ 30F5	ヶ 30F6	ヽ 30FD	ヾ 30FE	ー 30FC	。 3002	「 300C	」 300D	、 3001	・ 30FB	
Character allocations not following row 5 of JIS X 0208

==== JIS X 0201 Katakana set ====
ARIB STD-B24 JIS X 0201 Katakana set
	0	1	2	3	4	5	6	7	8	9	A	B	C	D	E	F
2x		｡ FF61	｢ FF62	｣ FF63	､ FF64	･ FF65	ｦ FF66	ｧ FF67	ｨ FF68	ｩ FF69	ｪ FF6A	ｫ FF6B	ｬ FF6C	ｭ FF6D	ｮ FF6E	ｯ FF6F
3x	ｰ FF70	ｱ FF71	ｲ FF72	ｳ FF73	ｴ FF74	ｵ FF75	ｶ FF76	ｷ FF77	ｸ FF78	ｹ FF79	ｺ FF7A	ｻ FF7B	ｼ FF7C	ｽ FF7D	ｾ FF7E	ｿ FF7F
4x	ﾀ FF80	ﾁ FF81	ﾂ FF82	ﾃ FF83	ﾄ FF84	ﾅ FF85	ﾆ FF86	ﾇ FF87	ﾈ FF88	ﾉ FF89	ﾊ FF8A	ﾋ FF8B	ﾌ FF8C	ﾍ FF8D	ﾎ FF8E	ﾏ FF8F
5x	ﾐ FF90	ﾑ FF91	ﾒ FF92	ﾓ FF93	ﾔ FF94	ﾕ FF95	ﾖ FF96	ﾗ FF97	ﾘ FF98	ﾙ FF99	ﾚ FF9A	ﾛ FF9B	ﾜ FF9C	ﾝ FF9D	ﾞ FF9E	ﾟ FF9F
6x																
7x																

==== Mosaic sets ====
ARIB STD-B24 Mosaic Set A (ISO-IR-71)
	0	1	2	3	4	5	6	7	8	9	A	B	C	D	E	F
2x		🬀 1FB00	🬁 1FB01	🬂 1FB02	🬃 1FB03	🬄 1FB04	🬅 1FB05	🬆 1FB06	🬇 1FB07	🬈 1FB08	🬉 1FB09	🬊 1FB0A	🬋 1FB0B	🬌 1FB0C	🬍 1FB0D	🬎 1FB0E
3x	🬏 1FB0F	🬐 1FB10	🬑 1FB11	🬒 1FB12	🬓 1FB13	▌ 258C	🬔 1FB14	🬕 1FB15	🬖 1FB16	🬗 1FB17	🬘 1FB18	🬙 1FB19	🬚 1FB1A	🬛 1FB1B	🬜 1FB1C	🬝 1FB1D
4x	🬼 1FB3C	🬽 1FB3D	🬾 1FB3E	🬿 1FB3F	🭀 1FB40	◣ 25E3	🭁 1FB41	🭂 1FB42	🭃 1FB43	🭄 1FB44	🭅 1FB45	🭆 1FB46	🭨 1FB68	🭩 1FB69	🭰 1FB70	🮕 1FB95
5x	🭇 1FB47	🭈 1FB48	🭉 1FB49	🭊 1FB4A	🭋 1FB4B	◢ 25E2	🭌 1FB4C	🭍 1FB4D	🭎 1FB4E	🭏 1FB4F	🭐 1FB50	🭑 1FB51	🭪 1FB6A	🭫 1FB6B	🭵 1FB75	█ 2588
6x	🬞 1FB1E	🬟 1FB1F	🬠 1FB20	🬡 1FB21	🬢 1FB22	🬣 1FB23	🬤 1FB24	🬥 1FB25	🬦 1FB26	🬧 1FB27	▐ 2590	🬨 1FB28	🬩 1FB29	🬪 1FB2A	🬫 1FB2B	🬬 1FB2C
7x	🬭 1FB2D	🬮 1FB2E	🬯 1FB2F	🬰 1FB30	🬱 1FB31	🬲 1FB32	🬳 1FB33	🬴 1FB34	🬵 1FB35	🬶 1FB36	🬷 1FB37	🬸 1FB38	🬹 1FB39	🬺 1FB3A	🬻 1FB3B	

ARIB STD-B24 Mosaic Set B (ISO-IR-137)
	0	1	2	3	4	5	6	7	8	9	A	B	C	D	E	F
2x		▖ 2596	▪ 25AA	𜹇 1CE47	▟ 259F	�	�	▶ 25B6	�	🠷 1F837	�	�	🮛 1FB9B	🯣 1FBE3	🯫 1FBEB	�
3x	▄ 2584	▗ 2597	▬ 25AC	𜹐 1CE50	▙ 2599	�	�	◀ 25C0	�	🠵 1F835	�	�	🮚 1FB9A	🯡 1FBE1	🯩 1FBE9	�
4x																
5x																
6x	🭒 1FB52	🭓 1FB53	🭔 1FB54	🭕 1FB55	🭖 1FB56	◥ 25E5	🭗 1FB57	🭘 1FB58	🭙 1FB59	🭚 1FB5A	🭛 1FB5B	🭜 1FB5C	🭬 1FB6C	🭭 1FB6D		
7x	🭝 1FB5D	🭞 1FB5E	🭟 1FB5F	🭠 1FB60	🭡 1FB61	◤ 25E4	🭢 1FB62	🭣 1FB63	🭤 1FB64	🭥 1FB65	🭦 1FB66	🭧 1FB67	🭮 1FB6E	🭯 1FB6F		
� Not in Unicode

ARIB STD-B24 Mosaic Set C
	0	1	2	3	4	5	6	7	8	9	A	B	C	D	E	F
2x		𜹑 1CE51	𜹒 1CE52	𜹓 1CE53	𜹔 1CE54	𜹕 1CE55	𜹖 1CE56	𜹗 1CE57	𜹘 1CE58	𜹙 1CE59	𜹚 1CE5A	𜹛 1CE5B	𜹜 1CE5C	𜹝 1CE5D	𜹞 1CE5E	𜹟 1CE5F
3x	𜹠 1CE60	𜹡 1CE61	𜹢 1CE62	𜹣 1CE63	𜹤 1CE64	𜹥 1CE65	𜹦 1CE66	𜹧 1CE67	𜹨 1CE68	𜹩 1CE69	𜹪 1CE6A	𜹫 1CE6B	𜹬 1CE6C	𜹭 1CE6D	𜹮 1CE6E	𜹯 1CE6F
4x																
5x																𜺏 1CE8F
6x	𜹰 1CE70	𜹱 1CE71	𜹲 1CE72	𜹳 1CE73	𜹴 1CE74	𜹵 1CE75	𜹶 1CE76	𜹷 1CE77	𜹸 1CE78	𜹹 1CE79	𜹺 1CE7A	𜹻 1CE7B	𜹼 1CE7C	𜹽 1CE7D	𜹾 1CE7E	𜹿 1CE7F
7x	𜺀 1CE80	𜺁 1CE81	𜺂 1CE82	𜺃 1CE83	𜺄 1CE84	𜺅 1CE85	𜺆 1CE86	𜺇 1CE87	𜺈 1CE88	𜺉 1CE89	𜺊 1CE8A	𜺋 1CE8B	𜺌 1CE8C	𜺍 1CE8D	𜺎 1CE8E	

Most of ARIB STD-B24 Mosaic Set D does not exist in Unicode.

== Shift_JIS variant ==
In addition to the modified ISO 2022 encoding, the B24 standard also specifies a Shift JIS encoding following JIS X 0208:1997, but with the addition of the extended characters in the kanji set.

First byte
	0	1	2	3	4	5	6	7	8	9	A	B	C	D	E	F
0	␀	␁	␂	␃	␄	␅	␆	␇	␈	␉	␊	␋	␌	␍	␎	␏
1	␐	␑	␒	␓	␔	␕	␖	␗	␘	␙	␚	␛	␜	␝	␞	␟
2	␠	!	"	#	$	%	&	'	(	)	*	+	,	-	.	/
3	0	1	2	3	4	5	6	7	8	9	:	;	<	=	>	?
4	@	A	B	C	D	E	F	G	H	I	J	K	L	M	N	O
5	P	Q	R	S	T	U	V	W	X	Y	Z	[	¥	]	^	_
6	`	a	b	c	d	e	f	g	h	i	j	k	l	m	n	o
7	p	q	r	s	t	u	v	w	x	y	z	{	|	}	‾	␡
8
9
A		｡	｢	｣	､	･	ｦ	ｧ	ｨ	ｩ	ｪ	ｫ	ｬ	ｭ	ｮ	ｯ
B	ｰ	ｱ	ｲ	ｳ	ｴ	ｵ	ｶ	ｷ	ｸ	ｹ	ｺ	ｻ	ｼ	ｽ	ｾ	ｿ
C	ﾀ	ﾁ	ﾂ	ﾃ	ﾄ	ﾅ	ﾆ	ﾇ	ﾈ	ﾉ	ﾊ	ﾋ	ﾌ	ﾍ	ﾎ	ﾏ
D	ﾐ	ﾑ	ﾒ	ﾓ	ﾔ	ﾕ	ﾖ	ﾗ	ﾘ	ﾙ	ﾚ	ﾛ	ﾜ	ﾝ	ﾞ	ﾟ
E
F

Second byte
	0	1	2	3	4	5	6	7	8	9	A	B	C	D	E	F
0
1
2
3
4
5
6
7
8
9
A
B
C
D
E
F

Non printable ASCII character
Unaltered ASCII character
Modified ASCII character
Single-byte half-width katakana
First byte of a double-byte character, used by JIS X 0208
First byte of an ARIB extended character
Not used as first byte, unallocated space in JIS X 0208
Not used as first byte
Second byte of a double-byte character whose first half of the JIS sequence was odd
Second byte of a double-byte character whose first half of the JIS sequence was even
Unused as second byte of a double-byte character
