= Enclosed Ideographic Supplement =

- Range: U+1F200..U+1F2FF (256 code points)
- Plane: SMP
- Scripts: Hiragana (1 char.); Common (63 char.)
- Assigned: 64 code points
- Unused: 192 reserved code points
- Source standards: ARIB STD-B24

Unicode version history
- 5.2 (2009): 44 (+44)
- 6.0 (2010): 57 (+13)
- 9.0 (2016): 58 (+1)
- 10.0 (2017): 64 (+6)

Unicode documentation
- Code chart ∣ Web page

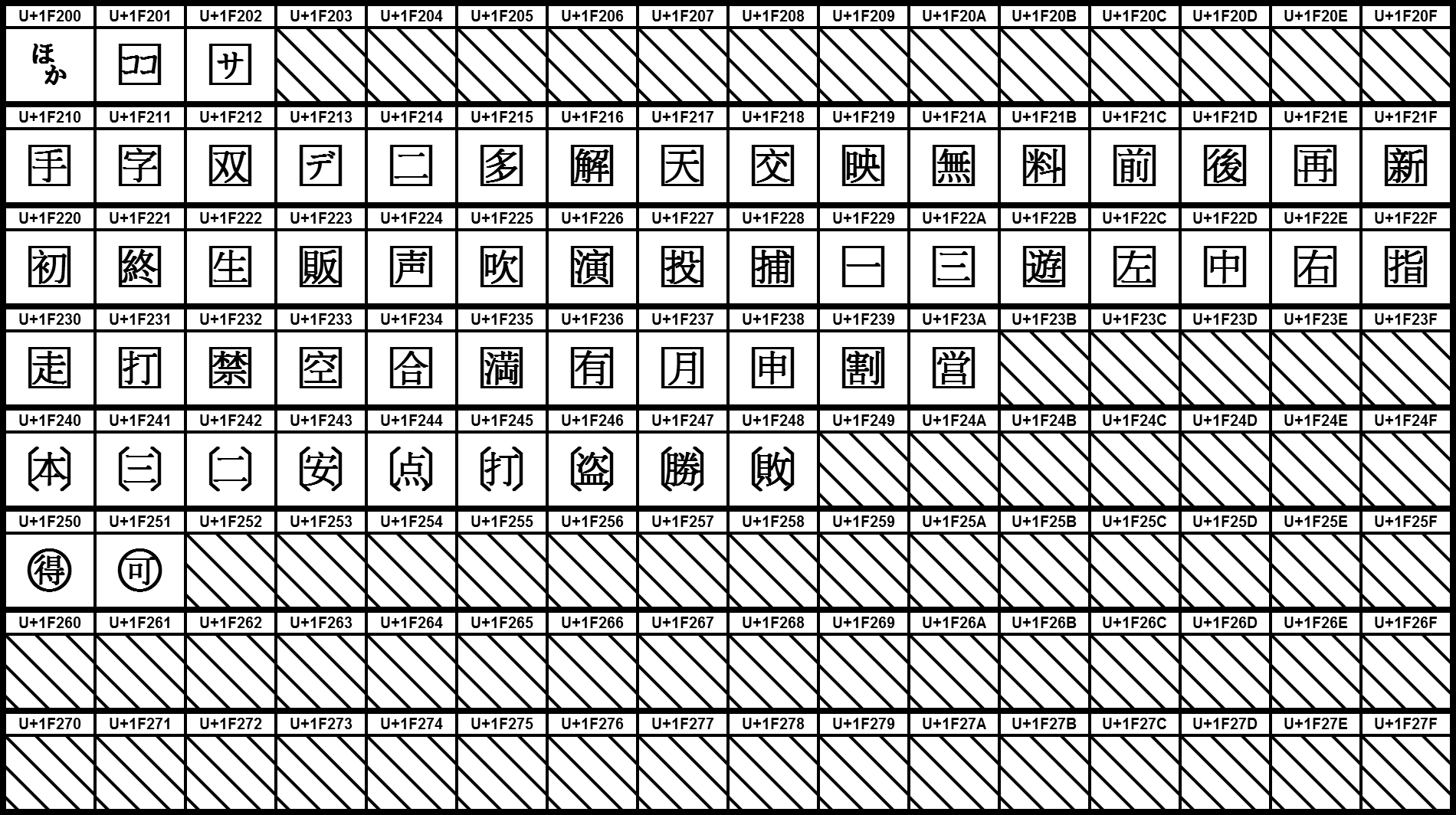
Graphical representation of the Enclosed Ideographic Supplement Unicode block

Enclosed Ideographic Supplement is a Unicode block containing forms of characters and words from Chinese, Japanese and Korean enclosed within or stylised as squares, brackets, or circles. It contains three such characters containing one or more kana, and many containing CJK ideographs. Many of its characters were added for compatibility with the Japanese ARIB STD-B24 standard. Six symbols from Chinese folk religion were added in Unicode version 10.

== Block ==
Enclosed Ideographic Supplement^{[1]}^{[2]} Official Unicode Consortium code chart (PDF)
| | 0 | 1 | 2 | 3 | 4 | 5 | 6 | 7 | 8 | 9 | A | B | C | D | E | F |
| U+1F20x | 🈀 | 🈁 | 🈂 | | | | | | | | | | | | | |
| U+1F21x | 🈐 | 🈑 | 🈒 | 🈓 | 🈔 | 🈕 | 🈖 | 🈗 | 🈘 | 🈙 | 🈚 | 🈛 | 🈜 | 🈝 | 🈞 | 🈟 |
| U+1F22x | 🈠 | 🈡 | 🈢 | 🈣 | 🈤 | 🈥 | 🈦 | 🈧 | 🈨 | 🈩 | 🈪 | 🈫 | 🈬 | 🈭 | 🈮 | 🈯 |
| U+1F23x | 🈰 | 🈱 | 🈲 | 🈳 | 🈴 | 🈵 | 🈶 | 🈷 | 🈸 | 🈹 | 🈺 | 🈻 | | | | |
| U+1F24x | 🉀 | 🉁 | 🉂 | 🉃 | 🉄 | 🉅 | 🉆 | 🉇 | 🉈 | | | | | | | |
| U+1F25x | 🉐 | 🉑 | | | | | | | | | | | | | | |
| U+1F26x | 🉠 | 🉡 | 🉢 | 🉣 | 🉤 | 🉥 | | | | | | | | | | |
| U+1F27x | | | | | | | | | | | | | | | | |
| U+1F28x | | | | | | | | | | | | | | | | |
| U+1F29x | | | | | | | | | | | | | | | | |
| U+1F2Ax | | | | | | | | | | | | | | | | |
| U+1F2Bx | | | | | | | | | | | | | | | | |
| U+1F2Cx | | | | | | | | | | | | | | | | |
| U+1F2Dx | | | | | | | | | | | | | | | | |
| U+1F2Ex | | | | | | | | | | | | | | | | |
| U+1F2Fx | | | | | | | | | | | | | | | | |
Notes: 1. As of Unicode version 17.0; 2. Grey areas indicate non-assigned code points

== Emoji ==
The Enclosed Ideographic Supplement block contains fifteen emoji: U+1F201–U+1F202, U+1F21A, U+1F22F, U+1F232–U+1F23A and U+1F250–U+1F251.

The block has eight standardized variants defined to specify emoji-style (U+FE0F VS16) or text presentation (U+FE0E VS15) for the following four base characters: U+1F202, U+1F21A, U+1F22F and U+1F237.

Emoji variation sequences
| U+ | 1F202 | 1F21A | 1F22F | 1F237 |
| default presentation | text | emoji | emoji | text |
| base code point | 🈂 | 🈚 | 🈯 | 🈷 |
| base+VS15 (text) | 🈂︎ | 🈚︎ | 🈯︎ | 🈷︎ |
| base+VS16 (emoji) | 🈂️ | 🈚️ | 🈯️ | 🈷️ |

== History ==
The following Unicode-related documents record the purpose and process of defining specific characters in the Enclosed Ideographic Supplement block:

| Version | Final code points (Note: Proposed code points and characters names may differ from final code points and names) | Count | L2 ID | WG2 ID | Document |
|---|---|---|---|---|---|
| 5.2 | U+1F200, 1F210..1F231, 1F240..1F248 | 44 | | N3353 (pdf, doc) | Umamaheswaran, V. S. (2007-10-10), "M51.32", Unconfirmed minutes of WG 2 meeting 51 Hanzhou, China; 2007-04-24/27 |
| 5.2 | U+1F200, 1F210..1F231, 1F240..1F248 | 44 | L2/07-259 | | Suignard, Michel (2007-08-02), Japanese TV Symbols |
| 5.2 | U+1F200, 1F210..1F231, 1F240..1F248 | 44 | L2/07-391 | N3341 | Suignard, Michel (2007-09-18), Japanese TV Symbols |
| 5.2 | U+1F200, 1F210..1F231, 1F240..1F248 | 44 | L2/08-077R2 | N3397 | Suignard, Michel (2008-03-11), Japanese TV symbols |
| 5.2 | U+1F200, 1F210..1F231, 1F240..1F248 | 44 | L2/08-128 | | Iancu, Laurențiu (2008-03-22), Names and allocation of some Japanese TV symbols from N3397 |
| 5.2 | U+1F200, 1F210..1F231, 1F240..1F248 | 44 | L2/08-158 | | Pentzlin, Karl (2008-04-16), Comments on L2/08-077R2 "Japanese TV Symbols" |
| 5.2 | U+1F200, 1F210..1F231, 1F240..1F248 | 44 | L2/08-188 | N3468 | Sekiguchi, Masahiro (2008-04-22), Collected comments on Japanese TV Symbols (WG2 N3397) |
| 5.2 | U+1F200, 1F210..1F231, 1F240..1F248 | 44 | L2/08-077R3 | N3469 | Suignard, Michel (2008-04-23), Japanese TV symbols |
| 5.2 | U+1F200, 1F210..1F231, 1F240..1F248 | 44 | L2/08-215 | | Pentzlin, Karl (2008-05-07), Comments on L2/08-077R2 "Japanese TV Symbols" |
| 5.2 | U+1F200, 1F210..1F231, 1F240..1F248 | 44 | L2/08-289 | | Pentzlin, Karl (2008-08-05), Proposal to rename and reassign some Japanese TV Symbols from L2/08-077R3 |
| 5.2 | U+1F200, 1F210..1F231, 1F240..1F248 | 44 | L2/08-292 | | Stötzner, Andreas (2008-08-06), Improvement suggestions for n3469 |
| 5.2 | U+1F200, 1F210..1F231, 1F240..1F248 | 44 | L2/08-307 | | Scherer, Markus (2008-08-08), Feedback on the Japanese TV Symbols Proposal (L2/08-077R3) |
| 5.2 | U+1F200, 1F210..1F231, 1F240..1F248 | 44 | L2/08-318 | N3453 (pdf, doc) | Umamaheswaran, V. S. (2008-08-13), "M52.14", Unconfirmed minutes of WG 2 meeting 52 |
| 5.2 | U+1F200, 1F210..1F231, 1F240..1F248 | 44 | L2/08-161R2 | | Moore, Lisa (2008-11-05), "Consensus 115-C17", UTC #115 Minutes, "Approve 186 Japanese TV symbols for encoding in a future version of the standard." |
| 5.2 | U+1F200, 1F210..1F231, 1F240..1F248 | 44 | L2/09-234 | N3603 (pdf, doc) | Umamaheswaran, V. S. (2009-07-08), "M54.03b", Unconfirmed minutes of WG 2 meeting 54 |
| 5.2 | U+1F200, 1F210..1F231, 1F240..1F248 | 44 | L2/09-104 | | Moore, Lisa (2009-05-20), "Consensus 119-C21", UTC #119 / L2 #216 Minutes |
| 5.2 | U+1F200, 1F210..1F231, 1F240..1F248 | 44 | L2/11-438 (Note: See also L2/10-458, L2/11-414, L2/11-415, and L2/11-429) (Note: Refer to the history section of the Miscellaneous Symbols and Pictographs block for additional emoji-related documents) | N4182 | Edberg, Peter (2011-12-22), Emoji Variation Sequences (Revision of L2/11-429) |
| 6.0 | U+1F201..1F202, 1F232..1F23A, 1F250..1F251 | 13 | L2/09-025R2 | N3582 (Note: Japanese translation of N3582 is available as N3621) | Scherer, Markus; Davis, Mark; Momoi, Kat; Tong, Darick; Kida, Yasuo; Edberg, Peter (2009-03-05), Proposal for Encoding Emoji Symbols |
| 6.0 | U+1F201..1F202, 1F232..1F23A, 1F250..1F251 | 13 | L2/09-026R | N3583 | Scherer, Markus; Davis, Mark; Momoi, Kat; Tong, Darick; Kida, Yasuo; Edberg, Peter (2009-02-06), Emoji Symbols Proposed for New Encoding |
| 6.0 | U+1F201..1F202, 1F232..1F23A, 1F250..1F251 | 13 | L2/09-027R2 | N3681 | Scherer, Markus (2009-09-17), Emoji Symbols: Background Data |
| 6.0 | U+1F201..1F202, 1F232..1F23A, 1F250..1F251 | 13 | L2/10-132 | | Scherer, Markus; Davis, Mark; Momoi, Kat; Tong, Darick; Kida, Yasuo; Edberg, Peter (2010-04-27), Emoji Symbols: Background Data |
| 6.0 | U+1F201..1F202, 1F232..1F23A, 1F250..1F251 | 13 | L2/15-050R (Note: See also L2/13-207, L2/14-054, L2/14-063, L2/15-051A, L2/15-051B) | | Davis, Mark; et al. (2015-01-29), Additional variation selectors for emoji |
| 9.0 | U+1F23B | 1 | L2/15-238 | N4671 | Proposal to include additional Japanese TV symbols to ISO/IEC 10646, 2015-07-23 |
| 9.0 | U+1F23B | 1 | L2/15-312 | | Anderson, Deborah; Whistler, Ken; McGowan, Rick; Pournader, Roozbeh; Glass, Andrew; Iancu, Laurențiu (2015-11-01), "10. Japanese TV symbols", Recommendations to UTC #145 November 2015 on Script Proposals |
| 9.0 | U+1F23B | 1 | L2/15-254 | | Moore, Lisa (2015-11-16), "Consensus 145-C30", UTC #145 Minutes, "Accept U+1F23B plus the list of 18 ARIB symbols based on the consent docket L2/15-270, for encoding in Unicode 9.0." |
| 9.0 | U+1F23B | 1 | | N4739 | "M64.06", Unconfirmed minutes of WG 2 meeting 64, 2016-08-31 |
| 10.0 | U+1F260..1F265 | 6 | L2/14-278 | | Afshar, Shervin; Pournader, Roozbeh (2014-11-01), Six New Symbols from Chinese Folk Religion |
| 10.0 | U+1F260..1F265 | 6 | L2/14-250 | | Moore, Lisa (2014-11-10), "Consensus 141-C28", UTC #141 Minutes, "Accept the 6 symbol characters U+1F260..U+1F265 for encoding in a future version of the standard, with properties as given in L2/14-278R." |
| 10.0 | U+1F260..1F265 | 6 | L2/23-281 | | Koo, Night (2023-11-28), Update Suzhou numerals in CJK Symbols font (GitHub issue) |
| 10.0 | U+1F260..1F265 | 6 | L2/24-012 | | Lunde, Ken (2024-01-11), "19", CJK & Unihan Group Recommendations for UTC #178 Meeting |
| 10.0 | U+1F260..1F265 | 6 | L2/24-006 | | Constable, Peter (2024-01-31), "Section 19", UTC #178 Minutes |

== See also ==
- CJK Unified Ideographs
- Hiragana (Unicode block)
- Katakana (Unicode block)
