= Te (kana) =

te

| Hiragana | Katakana |
- Transliteration: te
- Translit. with dakuten: de
- Hiragana origin: 天
- Katakana origin: 天
- Man'yōgana: 堤 天 帝 底 手 代 直
- Voiced man'yōgana: 代 田 泥 庭 伝 殿 而 涅 提 弟
- Spelling kana: テレビのテ (Terebi no "te")
- Unicode: U+3066, U+30C6
- Braille: ⠟

Te (hiragana: て, katakana: テ) is one of the Japanese kana, each of which represents one mora. Both represent [te].

| Form | Rōmaji | Hiragana | Katakana |
|---|---|---|---|
| Normal t- (た行 ta-gyō) | te | て | テ |
| Normal t- (た行 ta-gyō) | tei tee tē | てい てえ, てぇ てー | テイ テエ, テェ テー |
| Addition dakuten d- (だ行 da-gyō) | de | で | デ |
| Addition dakuten d- (だ行 da-gyō) | dei dee dē | でい でえ, でぇ でー | デイ デエ, デェ デー |

Other additional forms

Form A (ty-)
| Romaji | Hiragana | Katakana |
|---|---|---|
| tya | てゃ | テャ |
| ti, tyi | てぃ | ティ |
| tyu | てゅ | テュ |
| tye | てぃぇ | ティェ |
| tyo | てょ | テョ |

Form B (dy-)
| Romaji | Hiragana | Katakana |
|---|---|---|
| dya | でゃ | デャ |
| di, dyi | でぃ | ディ |
| dyu | でゅ | デュ |
| dye | でぃぇ | ディェ |
| dyo | でょ | デョ |

== Stroke order ==
Stroke order in writing て

Stroke order in writing テ

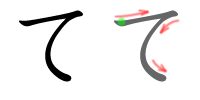
Stroke order in writing て

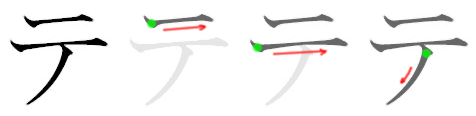
Stroke order in writing テ

== Other communicative representations ==
| Japanese radiotelephony alphabet | Wabun code |
| テレビのテ; Terebi no "Te" | ▄ ▄▄▄ ▄ ▄▄▄ ▄▄▄ |

Japanese Navy Signal Flag

Japanese semaphore
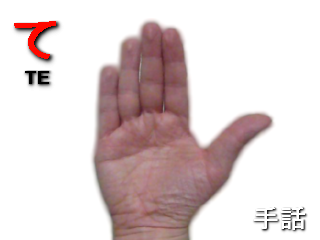
Japanese manual syllabary (fingerspelling)
Braille dots-12345
Japanese Braille

=== Braille forms ===
て / テ in Japanese Braille
| て / テ te | で / デ de | てい / テー tē/tei | でい / デー dē/dei |
| ⠟ (braille pattern dots-12345) | ⠐ (braille pattern dots-5) ⠟ (braille pattern dots-12345) | ⠟ (braille pattern dots-12345) ⠒ (braille pattern dots-25) | ⠐ (braille pattern dots-5) ⠟ (braille pattern dots-12345) ⠒ (braille pattern dots-25) |

=== Computer encodings ===
Character information
| Preview | て | | テ | | ﾃ | | で | | デ | |
|---|---|---|---|---|---|---|---|---|---|---|
| Unicode name | HIRAGANA LETTER TE | | KATAKANA LETTER TE | | HALFWIDTH KATAKANA LETTER TE | | HIRAGANA LETTER DE | | KATAKANA LETTER DE | |
| Encodings | decimal | hex | dec | hex | dec | hex | dec | hex | dec | hex |
| Unicode | 12390 | U+3066 | 12486 | U+30C6 | 65411 | U+FF83 | 12391 | U+3067 | 12487 | U+30C7 |
| UTF-8 | 227 129 166 | E3 81 A6 | 227 131 134 | E3 83 86 | 239 190 131 | EF BE 83 | 227 129 167 | E3 81 A7 | 227 131 135 | E3 83 87 |
| Numeric character reference | &#12390; | &#x3066; | &#12486; | &#x30C6; | &#65411; | &#xFF83; | &#12391; | &#x3067; | &#12487; | &#x30C7; |
| Shift JIS | 130 196 | 82 C4 | 131 101 | 83 65 | 195 | C3 | 130 197 | 82 C5 | 131 102 | 83 66 |
| EUC-JP | 164 198 | A4 C6 | 165 198 | A5 C6 | 142 195 | 8E C3 | 164 199 | A4 C7 | 165 199 | A5 C7 |
| GB 18030 | 164 198 | A4 C6 | 165 198 | A5 C6 | 132 49 153 49 | 84 31 99 31 | 164 199 | A4 C7 | 165 199 | A5 C7 |
| EUC-KR / UHC | 170 198 | AA C6 | 171 198 | AB C6 | | | 170 199 | AA C7 | 171 199 | AB C7 |
| Big5 (non-ETEN kana) | 198 202 | C6 CA | 199 94 | C7 5E | | | 198 203 | C6 CB | 199 95 | C7 5F |
| Big5 (ETEN / HKSCS) | 199 77 | C7 4D | 199 194 | C7 C2 | | | 199 78 | C7 4E | 199 195 | C7 C3 |

Character information
| Preview | ㋢ | | 🈓 | |
|---|---|---|---|---|
| Unicode name | CIRCLED KATAKANA TE | | SQUARED KATAKANA DE | |
| Encodings | decimal | hex | dec | hex |
| Unicode | 13026 | U+32E2 | 127507 | U+1F213 |
| UTF-8 | 227 139 162 | E3 8B A2 | 240 159 136 147 | F0 9F 88 93 |
| UTF-16 | 13026 | 32E2 | 55356 56851 | D83C DE13 |
| Numeric character reference | &#13026; | &#x32E2; | &#127507; | &#x1F213; |
| Shift JIS (ARIB) | | | 237 214 | ED D6 |
| GB 18030 | 129 57 211 52 | 81 39 D3 34 | 148 57 152 49 | 94 39 98 31 |

== See also ==
- Te form of Japanese verb
