= Enclosed CJK Letters and Months =

Group of Unicode symbols

- Range: U+3200..U+32FF (256 code points)
- Plane: BMP
- Scripts: Hangul (62 char.); Katakana (47 char.); Common (146 char.)
- Assigned: 255 code points
- Unused: 1 reserved code points
- Source standards: ARIB STD-B24

Unicode Version History
- 1.0.0 (1991): 191 (+191)
- 1.0.1 (1992): 190 (-1)
- 1.1 (1993): 202 (+12)
- 3.2 (2002): 232 (+30)
- 4.0 (2003): 241 (+9)
- 4.1 (2005): 242 (+1)
- 5.2 (2009): 254 (+12)
- 12.1 (2019): 255 (+1)

Unicode documentation
- Code chart ∣ Web page
- Note: In Unicode 1.0.1, during the process of unifying with ISO 10646, one character from the Enclosed CJK Letters and Months block was relocated to the CJK Symbols and Punctuation block, and the encircled katakana letters were re-arranged.

Enclosed CJK Letters and Months is a Unicode block containing circled and parenthesized Katakana, Hangul, and CJK ideographs. Also included in the block are miscellaneous glyphs that would more likely fit in CJK Compatibility or Enclosed Alphanumerics: a few unit abbreviations, circled numbers from 21 to 50, and circled multiples of 10 from 10 to 80 enclosed in black squares (representing speed limit signs).

Its block name in Unicode 1.0 was Enclosed CJK Letters and Ideographs. As part of the process of unification with ISO 10646 for version 1.1, Unicode version 1.0.1 relocated the Japanese Industrial Standard Symbol from the code point U+32FF at the end of the block to U+3004, and re-arranged the encircled katakana letters (U+32D0–U+32FE) from iroha order to gojūon order.

The Reiwa symbol (㋿) was added to Enclosed CJK Letters and Months in Unicode 12.1, continuing from the existing era symbols in the (fully allocated by that point) CJK Compatibility block (Meiji ㍾, Taishō ㍽, Shōwa ㍼, Heisei ㍻).

== Block ==
Enclosed CJK Letters and Months^{[1]}^{[2]} Official Unicode Consortium code chart (PDF)
	0	1	2	3	4	5	6	7	8	9	A	B	C	D	E	F
U+320x	㈀	㈁	㈂	㈃	㈄	㈅	㈆	㈇	㈈	㈉	㈊	㈋	㈌	㈍	㈎	㈏
U+321x	㈐	㈑	㈒	㈓	㈔	㈕	㈖	㈗	㈘	㈙	㈚	㈛	㈜	㈝	㈞	
U+322x	㈠	㈡	㈢	㈣	㈤	㈥	㈦	㈧	㈨	㈩	㈪	㈫	㈬	㈭	㈮	㈯
U+323x	㈰	㈱	㈲	㈳	㈴	㈵	㈶	㈷	㈸	㈹	㈺	㈻	㈼	㈽	㈾	㈿
U+324x	㉀	㉁	㉂	㉃	㉄	㉅	㉆	㉇	㉈	㉉	㉊	㉋	㉌	㉍	㉎	㉏
U+325x	㉐	㉑	㉒	㉓	㉔	㉕	㉖	㉗	㉘	㉙	㉚	㉛	㉜	㉝	㉞	㉟
U+326x	㉠	㉡	㉢	㉣	㉤	㉥	㉦	㉧	㉨	㉩	㉪	㉫	㉬	㉭	㉮	㉯
U+327x	㉰	㉱	㉲	㉳	㉴	㉵	㉶	㉷	㉸	㉹	㉺	㉻	㉼	㉽	㉾	㉿
U+328x	㊀	㊁	㊂	㊃	㊄	㊅	㊆	㊇	㊈	㊉	㊊	㊋	㊌	㊍	㊎	㊏
U+329x	㊐	㊑	㊒	㊓	㊔	㊕	㊖	㊗	㊘	㊙	㊚	㊛	㊜	㊝	㊞	㊟
U+32Ax	㊠	㊡	㊢	㊣	㊤	㊥	㊦	㊧	㊨	㊩	㊪	㊫	㊬	㊭	㊮	㊯
U+32Bx	㊰	㊱	㊲	㊳	㊴	㊵	㊶	㊷	㊸	㊹	㊺	㊻	㊼	㊽	㊾	㊿
U+32Cx	㋀	㋁	㋂	㋃	㋄	㋅	㋆	㋇	㋈	㋉	㋊	㋋	㋌	㋍	㋎	㋏
U+32Dx	㋐	㋑	㋒	㋓	㋔	㋕	㋖	㋗	㋘	㋙	㋚	㋛	㋜	㋝	㋞	㋟
U+32Ex	㋠	㋡	㋢	㋣	㋤	㋥	㋦	㋧	㋨	㋩	㋪	㋫	㋬	㋭	㋮	㋯
U+32Fx	㋰	㋱	㋲	㋳	㋴	㋵	㋶	㋷	㋸	㋹	㋺	㋻	㋼	㋽	㋾	㋿
Notes 1.As of Unicode version 17.0 2.Grey area indicates non-assigned code point

=== Meanings ===
U+3200 through U+321E are parenthesized Hangul letters and syllables, while U+3260 through U+327E are circled Hangul letters and symbols. The first 18 characters of each group are the same. U+3220 through U+3230 are the parenthesized characters for the numbers one through ten, the moon, the five elements, and the sun; the latter seven correspond to the East Asian names for days of the week. The same characters are repeated in U+3280 through U+3290, which uses circled characters instead. The graphemes ㋀ through ㋋ correspond to the months of January through December. U+32D0 through U+32FE are circled Katakana.

== Emoji ==
The Enclosed CJK Letters and Months block contains two emoji: U+3297 and U+3299.

The block has four standardized variants defined to specify emoji-style (U+FE0F VS16) or text presentation (U+FE0E VS15) for the two emoji, both of which default to a text presentation.

Emoji variation sequences
U+	3297	3299
base code point	㊗	㊙
base+VS15 (text)	㊗︎	㊙︎
base+VS16 (emoji)	㊗️	㊙️

== History ==
- U+32FF JAPANESE INDUSTRIAL STANDARD SYMBOL (〄) was moved to U+3004 in Unicode version 1.0.1, to make Unicode a subset of ISO 10646. U+32FF was defined as SQUARE ERA NAME REIWA (㋿) with the release of Unicode 12.1.

The following Unicode-related documents record the purpose and process of defining specific characters in the Enclosed CJK Letters and Months block:

Version	Final code points (Note: Proposed code points and characters names may differ from final code points and names)	Count	L2 ID	WG2 ID	Document
1.0.0	U+3200..321C, 3220..3243, 3260..327B, 327F..32B0, 32D0..32FE	190			(to be determined)
1.0.0	U+3200..321C, 3220..3243, 3260..327B, 327F..32B0, 32D0..32FE	190	L2/11-438 (Note: See also L2/10-458, L2/11-414, L2/11-415, and L2/11-429) (Note: Refer to the history section of the Miscellaneous Symbols and Pictographs block for additional emoji-related documents)	N4182	Edberg, Peter (22 December 2011), Emoji Variation Sequences (Revision of L2/11-429)
1.1	U+32C0..32CB	12			(to be determined)
3.2	U+3251..325F, 32B1..32BF	30	L2/99-238		Consolidated document containing 6 Japanese proposals, 15 July 1999
3.2	U+3251..325F, 32B1..32BF	30		N2093	Addition of medical symbols and enclosed numbers, 13 September 1999
3.2	U+3251..325F, 32B1..32BF	30	L2/00-010	N2103	Umamaheswaran, V. S. (5 January 2000), "8.8", Minutes of WG 2 meeting 37, Copenhagen, Denmark: 1999-09-13—16
3.2	U+3251..325F, 32B1..32BF	30	L2/00-296	N2256	Sato, T. K. (4 September 2000), Circled Numbers in JIS X 0213
4.0	U+321D..321E, 3250, 327C..327D, 32CC..32CF	9	L2/99-353	N2056	"3", Amendment of the part concerning the Korean characters in ISO/IEC 10646-1:1998 amendment 5, 29 July 1999
4.0	U+321D..321E, 3250, 327C..327D, 32CC..32CF	9	L2/99-380		Proposal for a New Work item (NP) to amend the Korean part in ISO/IEC 10646-1:1993, 7 December 1999
4.0	U+321D..321E, 3250, 327C..327D, 32CC..32CF	9	L2/99-380.3		Annex B, Special characters compatible with KPS 9566-97 (To be extended), 7 December 1999
4.0	U+321D..321E, 3250, 327C..327D, 32CC..32CF	9	L2/00-084	N2182	"3", Amendment of the part concerning the Korean characters in ISO/IEC 10646-1:1998 amendment 5 (Cover page and outline of proposal L2/99-380), 7 December 1999
4.0	U+321D..321E, 3250, 327C..327D, 32CC..32CF	9	L2/99-382		Whistler, Ken (9 December 1999), "2.3", Comments to accompany a U.S. NO vote on JTC1 N5999, SC2 N3393, New Work item proposal (NP) for an amendment of the Korean part of ISO/IEC 10646-1:1993
4.0	U+321D..321E, 3250, 327C..327D, 32CC..32CF	9	L2/00-066	N2170 (pdf, doc)	"3", The technical justification of the proposal to amend the Korean character part of ISO/IEC 10646-1 (proposed addition of 79 symbolic characters), 10 February 2000
4.0	U+321D..321E, 3250, 327C..327D, 32CC..32CF	9	L2/00-073	N2167	Karlsson, Kent (2 March 2000), Comments on DPRK New Work Item proposal on Korean characters
4.0	U+321D..321E, 3250, 327C..327D, 32CC..32CF	9	L2/00-285	N2244	Proposal for the Addition of 82 Symbols to ISO/IEC 10646-1:2000, 10 August 2000
4.0	U+321D..321E, 3250, 327C..327D, 32CC..32CF	9	L2/00-291		Everson, Michael (30 August 2000), Comments to Korean proposals (L2/00-284 - 289)
4.0	U+321D..321E, 3250, 327C..327D, 32CC..32CF	9		N2282	Report of the meeting of the Korean script ad hoc group, 21 September 2000
4.0	U+321D..321E, 3250, 327C..327D, 32CC..32CF	9	L2/01-349	N2374R	Proposal to add of 70 symbols to ISO/IEC 10646-1:2000, 3 September 2001
4.0	U+321D..321E, 3250, 327C..327D, 32CC..32CF	9	L2/01-387	N2390	Kim, Kyongsok (13 October 2001), ROK's Comments about DPRK's proposal, WG2 N 2374, to add 70 symbols to ISO/IEC 10646-1:2000
4.0	U+321D..321E, 3250, 327C..327D, 32CC..32CF	9	L2/01-388	N2392	Kim, Kyongsok (16 October 2001), A Report of Korean Script ad hoc group meeting on Oct. 15, 2001
4.0	U+321D..321E, 3250, 327C..327D, 32CC..32CF	9	L2/01-420		Whistler, Ken (30 October 2001), "f. Miscellaneous symbol additions from DPRK standard", WG2 (Singapore) Resolution Consent Docket for UTC
4.0	U+321D..321E, 3250, 327C..327D, 32CC..32CF	9	L2/01-458	N2407	Umamaheswaran, V. S. (16 November 2001), Request to Korean ad hoc group to generate mapping tables between ROK and DPRK national standards
4.0	U+321D..321E, 3250, 327C..327D, 32CC..32CF	9	L2/02-372	N2453 (pdf, doc)	Umamaheswaran, V. S. (30 October 2002), "M42.14 item j", Unconfirmed minutes of WG 2 meeting 42
4.1	U+327E	1	L2/04-267	N2815	Ahn, Dae Hyuk (18 June 2004), Proposal to add Postal Code Mark to BMP of UCS
4.1	U+327E	1		N2753 (pdf, doc)	"9.9", Unconfirmed minutes of WG 2 meeting 45; IBM Software Lab, Markham, Ontario, Canada; 2004-06-21/24, 26 December 2004
5.2	U+3244..324F	12		N3353 (pdf, doc)	Umamaheswaran, V. S. (10 October 2007), "M51.32", Unconfirmed minutes of WG 2 meeting 51 Hanzhou, China; 2007-04-24/27
5.2	U+3244..324F	12	L2/07-259		Suignard, Michel (2 August 2007), Japanese TV Symbols
5.2	U+3244..324F	12	L2/07-391	N3341	Suignard, Michel (18 September 2007), Japanese TV Symbols
5.2	U+3244..324F	12	L2/08-077R2	N3397	Suignard, Michel (11 March 2008), Japanese TV symbols
5.2	U+3244..324F	12	L2/08-128		Iancu, Laurențiu (22 March 2008), Names and allocation of some Japanese TV symbols from N3397
5.2	U+3244..324F	12	L2/08-158		Pentzlin, Karl (16 April 2008), Comments on L2/08-077R2 "Japanese TV Symbols"
5.2	U+3244..324F	12	L2/08-188	N3468	Sekiguchi, Masahiro (22 April 2008), Collected comments on Japanese TV Symbols (WG2 N3397)
5.2	U+3244..324F	12	L2/08-077R3	N3469	Suignard, Michel (23 April 2008), Japanese TV symbols
5.2	U+3244..324F	12	L2/08-215		Pentzlin, Karl (7 May 2008), Comments on L2/08-077R2 "Japanese TV Symbols"
5.2	U+3244..324F	12	L2/08-289		Pentzlin, Karl (5 August 2008), Proposal to rename and reassign some Japanese TV Symbols from L2/08-077R3
5.2	U+3244..324F	12	L2/08-292		Stötzner, Andreas (6 August 2008), Improvement suggestions for n3469
5.2	U+3244..324F	12	L2/08-307		Scherer, Markus (8 August 2008), Feedback on the Japanese TV Symbols Proposal (L2/08-077R3)
5.2	U+3244..324F	12	L2/08-318	N3453 (pdf, doc)	Umamaheswaran, V. S. (13 August 2008), "M52.14", Unconfirmed minutes of WG 2 meeting 52
5.2	U+3244..324F	12	L2/08-161R2		Moore, Lisa (5 November 2008), "Consensus 115-C17", UTC #115 Minutes, "Approve 186 Japanese TV symbols for encoding in a future version of the standard."
12.1	U+32FF	1		N4953 (pdf, doc)	"9.3.27", Unconfirmed minutes of WG 2 meeting 66, 23 March 2018
12.1	U+32FF	1	L2/17-429		Orita, Tetsuji (19 December 2017), Request to reserve the code point for square Japanese new era name (SC2 N4577)
12.1	U+32FF	1	L2/18-039		Anderson, Deborah; Whistler, Ken; Pournader, Roozbeh; Moore, Lisa; Liang, Hai; Cook, Richard (19 January 2018), "22. CJK", Recommendations to UTC #154 January 2018 on Script Proposals
12.1	U+32FF	1	L2/18-007		Moore, Lisa (19 March 2018), "C.8", UTC #154 Minutes
12.1	U+32FF	1	L2/18-115		Moore, Lisa (9 May 2018), "C.8", UTC #155 Minutes
12.1	U+32FF	1		N4949	Update on SC2 N4577 "Request to reserve the code point for square Japanese new era name", 23 May 2018
12.1	U+32FF	1	L2/18-220		Whistler, Ken (16 July 2018), Unicode 12.1 Planning Considerations
12.1	U+32FF	1	L2/18-183		Moore, Lisa (20 November 2018), "B.13.3.1 Unicode 12.1 planning considerations", UTC #156 Minutes
12.1	U+32FF	1		N5020 (pdf, doc)	Umamaheswaran, V. S. (11 January 2019), "10.3.9 Code point for Square Japanese New Era Name", Unconfirmed minutes of WG 2 meeting 67
12.1	U+32FF	1	L2/19-008		Moore, Lisa (8 February 2019), "B.13.4 Unicode V12.1", UTC #158 Minutes
12.1	U+32FF	1	L2/19-094		Orita, Tetsuji (1 April 2019), Announcement of Japanese new era name

== See also ==
- Hangul Jamo (Unicode block)
- Japanese rebus monogram
- Katakana (Unicode block)
