= Enclosed Alphanumerics =

Unicode block of typographical symbols

- Range: U+2460..U+24FF (160 code points)
- Plane: BMP
- Scripts: Common
- Assigned: 160 code points
- Unused: 0 reserved code points

Unicode Version History
- 1.0.0 (1991): 139 (+139)
- 3.2 (2002): 159 (+20)
- 4.0 (2003): 160 (+1)

Unicode documentation
- Code chart ∣ Web page

Enclosed Alphanumerics is a Unicode block of typographical symbols of an alphanumeric within a circle, a bracket or other not-closed enclosure, or ending in a full stop.

The block is fully allocated. Within the Basic Multilingual Plane, a few additional enclosed numerals are in the Dingbats and the Enclosed CJK Letters and Months blocks. There is also a block with more of these characters in the Supplementary Multilingual Plane named Enclosed Alphanumeric Supplement (U+1F100–U+1F1FF), as of Unicode 6.0.

The character U+20DD ◌⃝ COMBINING ENCLOSING CIRCLE from Combining Diacritical Marks for Symbols is available for composing other, arbitrary encircled symbols.

== Purpose ==
Many of these characters were originally intended for use as bullets for lists. The parenthesized forms are historically based on typewriter approximations of the circled versions. Although these roles have been supplanted by styles and other markup in "rich text" contexts, the characters are included in the Unicode standard "for interoperability with the legacy East Asian character sets and for the occasional text context where such symbols otherwise occur." The Unicode Standard considers these characters to be distinct from characters which are similar in form but specialized in purpose, such as the circled C, P or R characters which are defined as copyright and trademark symbols or the circled a used for an at sign.

A circled s (Ⓢ) was used in documents circa 1900 printed by German missionaries, especially the Basel Mission, in the Malayalam language to denote a ditto mark.

== Block ==
Enclosed Alphanumerics^{[1]} Official Unicode Consortium code chart (PDF)
	0	1	2	3	4	5	6	7	8	9	A	B	C	D	E	F
U+246x	①	②	③	④	⑤	⑥	⑦	⑧	⑨	⑩	⑪	⑫	⑬	⑭	⑮	⑯
U+247x	⑰	⑱	⑲	⑳	⑴	⑵	⑶	⑷	⑸	⑹	⑺	⑻	⑼	⑽	⑾	⑿
U+248x	⒀	⒁	⒂	⒃	⒄	⒅	⒆	⒇	⒈	⒉	⒊	⒋	⒌	⒍	⒎	⒏
U+249x	⒐	⒑	⒒	⒓	⒔	⒕	⒖	⒗	⒘	⒙	⒚	⒛	⒜	⒝	⒞	⒟
U+24Ax	⒠	⒡	⒢	⒣	⒤	⒥	⒦	⒧	⒨	⒩	⒪	⒫	⒬	⒭	⒮	⒯
U+24Bx	⒰	⒱	⒲	⒳	⒴	⒵	Ⓐ	Ⓑ	Ⓒ	Ⓓ	Ⓔ	Ⓕ	Ⓖ	Ⓗ	Ⓘ	Ⓙ
U+24Cx	Ⓚ	Ⓛ	Ⓜ	Ⓝ	Ⓞ	Ⓟ	Ⓠ	Ⓡ	Ⓢ	Ⓣ	Ⓤ	Ⓥ	Ⓦ	Ⓧ	Ⓨ	Ⓩ
U+24Dx	ⓐ	ⓑ	ⓒ	ⓓ	ⓔ	ⓕ	ⓖ	ⓗ	ⓘ	ⓙ	ⓚ	ⓛ	ⓜ	ⓝ	ⓞ	ⓟ
U+24Ex	ⓠ	ⓡ	ⓢ	ⓣ	ⓤ	ⓥ	ⓦ	ⓧ	ⓨ	ⓩ	⓪	⓫	⓬	⓭	⓮	⓯
U+24Fx	⓰	⓱	⓲	⓳	⓴	⓵	⓶	⓷	⓸	⓹	⓺	⓻	⓼	⓽	⓾	⓿
Notes 1.As of Unicode version 18.0

== Emoji ==
The Enclosed Alphanumerics block contains one emoji: U+24C2, the enclosed M (Ⓜ️), which is used as a symbol for mask works. Ⓜ️ can also represent rapid transit (metro) rail.

It defaults to a text presentation and has two standardized variants defined to specify text presentation (U+FE0E VS15) or emoji-style (U+FE0F VS16).

Emoji variation sequences
U+	24C2
base code point	Ⓜ
base+VS15 (text)	Ⓜ︎
base+VS16 (emoji)	Ⓜ️

== History ==
The following Unicode-related documents record the purpose and process of defining specific characters in the Enclosed Alphanumerics block:

Version	Final code points (Note: Proposed code points and characters names may differ from final code points and names)	Count	L2 ID	WG2 ID	Document
1.0.0	U+2460..24EA	139			(to be determined)
1.0.0	U+2460..24EA	139	L2/11-438 (Note: See also L2/10-458, L2/11-414, L2/11-415, and L2/11-429) (Note: Refer to the history section of the Miscellaneous Symbols and Pictographs block for additional emoji-related documents)	N4182	Edberg, Peter (2011-12-22), Emoji Variation Sequences (Revision of L2/11-429)
3.2	U+24EB..24FE	20	L2/99-238		Consolidated document containing 6 Japanese proposals, 1999-07-15
3.2	U+24EB..24FE	20		N2093	Addition of medical symbols and enclosed numbers, 1999-09-13
3.2	U+24EB..24FE	20	L2/00-010	N2103	Umamaheswaran, V. S. (2000-01-05), "8.8", Minutes of WG 2 meeting 37, Copenhagen, Denmark: 1999-09-13—16
3.2	U+24EB..24FE	20	L2/00-296	N2256	Sato, T. K. (2000-09-04), Circled Numbers in JIS X 0213
4.0	U+24FF	1	L2/01-480		Muller, Eric (2001-12-14), Proposal to add NEGATIVE CIRCLED DIGIT ZERO
4.0	U+24FF	1	L2/02-193		Muller, Eric (2001-12-14), Proposal to add Negative Circled Digit Zero
4.0	U+24FF	1	L2/02-070		Moore, Lisa (2002-08-26), "NEGATIVE CIRCLED DIGIT ZERO", Minutes for UTC #90, "Consensus: Accept the character NEGATIVE CIRCLED DIGIT ZERO at U+24FF."

== See also ==
- Special characters:
  - Enclosed C
  - Enclosed A
  - Copyright symbol
  - Registered trademark symbol
  - Sound recording copyright symbol
  - At sign (partially enclosed A)
- Character sets:
  - Japanese rebus monogram
  - Enclosed Alphanumeric Supplement
  - Enclosed CJK Letters and Months (extends enclosed Arabic decimal numbers to ㊿)
