= Broadcast Markup Language =

Standard for data broadcasting

Broadcast Markup Language, or BML, is an XML-based standard developed by Japan's Association of Radio Industries and Businesses as a data broadcasting specification for digital television broadcasting. It is a data-transmission service allowing text to be displayed on a 1seg TV screen.

The text contains news, sports, weather forecasts, emergency warnings such as Earthquake Early Warning, etc. free of charge. It was finalized in 1999, becoming ARIB STD-B24 Data Coding and Transmission Specification for Digital Broadcasting.

The STD-B24 specification is derived from an early draft of XHTML 1.0 strict, which it extends and alters. Some subset of CSS 1 and 2 is supported, as well as ECMAScript.

Example BML header:

<?xml version="1.0" encoding="EUC-JP" ?>
<!DOCTYPE bml PUBLIC "+//ARIB STD-B24:1999//DTD BML Document//JA" "bml_1_0.dtd">
<?bml bml-version="1.0" ?>

Since version 1.0 in 1999, BML standard has gone through several revisions, and as of 2007, it is on version 5.0. However, due to a large installed user base of receivers which only support the original 1.0 specification, broadcasters are not able to introduce new features defined in later revisions.

== See also ==
- ARIB STD B24 character set
- Integrated Services Digital Broadcasting
- 1seg
- Ginga (SBTVD Middleware)
