= Enclosed C =

Typographical symbol

Ⓒ ⓒo

Enclosed C
- In Unicode: U+24B8 Ⓒ CIRCLED LATIN CAPITAL LETTER C U+24D2 ⓒ CIRCLED LATIN SMALL LETTER C

Different from
- Different from: U+00A9 © COPYRIGHT SIGN

Enclosed C or circled Latin C (Ⓒ or ⓒ) is a typographical symbol. As one of many enclosed alphanumerics, the symbol is a "C" within a circle.

== Encodings ==
The symbols are encoded by Unicode in the block Enclosed Alphanumerics as CIRCLED LATIN CAPITAL LETTER C and CIRCLED LATIN SMALL LETTER C.

== Uses ==
Some Chiyoda Kogaku (a.k.a. Chiyoko) cameras of the 1947 to 1949 era featured a blue ⓒ symbol as part of the lens designation like in "ⓒ Super Rokkor", e.g. on the Minolta 35 or the Minolta Memo. It was used to indicate a (single) coated optics rather than any copyright. Similar engravings can be found also on lenses of other manufacturers, e.g. some Olympus Zuiko lenses carry a red-colored "Zuiko C." designation indicating coated optics.

This symbol was widely used by the Cruver manufacturing company on their plastic recognition models that were produced during World War II.

== See also ==
- Copyright symbol (©)
- Copyleft symbol (🄯)
