= Radical 74 =

Chinese character radical

月
- Radical 74 (U+2F49)
- 月 (U+6708) "moon, month"

Pronunciations
- Pinyin: yuè
- Bopomofo: ㄩㄝˋ
- Gwoyeu Romatzyh: yueh
- Wade–Giles: yüeh^{4}
- Cantonese Yale: yuht
- Jyutping: jyut6
- Pe̍h-ōe-jī: goa̍t
- Japanese Kana: ゲツ getsu / ガツ gatsu (on'yomi) つき tsuki (kun'yomi)
- Sino-Korean: 월 wol

Names
- Chinese name(s): (Left/right) 月字旁 yuèzìpáng (Bottom) 月字底 yuèzìdǐ
- Japanese name(s): 月/つき tsuki 月偏/つきへん tsukihen
- Hangul: 달 dal

Stroke order animation

Radical 74 or radical moon (月部) meaning "moon" or "month" is one of the 34 Kangxi radicals (214 radicals in total) composed of 4 strokes.

In the Kangxi Dictionary. there are 69 characters (out of 49,030) to be found under this radical.

月 is also the 88th indexing component in the Table of Indexing Chinese Character Components predominantly adopted by Simplified Chinese dictionaries published in mainland China. Character with the alternative form of Kangxi Radical 130 (⺼ "meat") is merged to this radical in Simplified Chinese, and no associated indexing component is left after the merger.

== Evolution ==
Compare 夕; unrelated to ⺼, 青 and 龍. 月 sometimes represents 舟 (as in 前 and 朕) or 肉 (such as 有 and 肘).

Shang dynasty oracle bone script

Western Zhou bronze script

Chu slip and silk script

Large seal script character

Small seal script character

== Derived characters ==
Strokes	Characters
+0	月
+2	有
+4	朊 朋 朌 服 肭
+5	朎 朏 朐 朑 胙
+6	朒 朓 朔 朕 朗 朗
+7	朖 朘 朙 (=明 -> 日) 朚 望
+8	朜 朝 朞 (=期) 期 朠^{SC/JP variant}
+9	朠^{TC variant} 朡
+10	朢 (=望)
+11	膤
+12	朣 朤 朥
+13	朦^{SC/JP variant}
+14	朦^{TC variant}
+16	朧

== Sinogram ==
The radical is also used as an independent Chinese character. It is one of the Kyōiku kanji or Kanji taught in elementary school in Japan. It is a first grade kanji.

== Literature ==
- Fazzioli, Edoardo (1987). Chinese calligraphy : from pictograph to ideogram : the history of 214 essential Chinese/Japanese characters. calligraphy by Rebecca Hon Ko. New York: Abbeville Press. ISBN 0-89659-774-1.
- Lunde, Ken (Jan 5, 2009). "Appendix J: Japanese Character Sets" (PDF). CJKV Information Processing: Chinese, Japanese, Korean & Vietnamese Computing (Second ed.). Sebastopol, Calif.: O'Reilly Media. ISBN 978-0-596-51447-1.
