= Kangxi Radicals (Unicode block) =

- Range: U+2F00..U+2FDF (224 code points)
- Plane: BMP
- Scripts: Han
- Symbol sets: CJK Radical
- Assigned: 214 code points
- Unused: 10 reserved code points
- Source standards: CNS 11643-1992

Unicode Version History
- 3.0 (1999): 214 (+214)

Unicode documentation
- Code chart ∣ Web page

Graphical representation of the Kangxi Radicals Unicode block

Kangxi Radicals is a Unicode block. In version 3.0 (1999), this separate Kangxi Radicals block was introduced which encodes the 214 radicals in sequence, at U+2F00–2FD5. These are specific code points intended to represent the radical qua radical, as opposed to the character consisting of the unaugmented radical; thus, U+2F00 represents radical 1 while U+4E00 represents the character yī meaning "one". In addition, the CJK Radicals Supplement block (2E80–2EFF) was introduced, encoding alternative (often positional) forms taken by Kangxi radicals as they appear within specific characters. For example, ⺁ "CJK RADICAL CLIFF" (U+2E81) is a variant of ⼚ radical 27 (U+2F1A), itself identical in shape to the character consisting of unaugmented radical 27, 厂 "cliff" (U+5382).

The Unicode standard encoded 20,992 characters in version 1.0.1 (1992) in the CJK Unified Ideographs block (U+4E00–9FFF). This standard followed the Kangxi order of radicals (radical 1 at U+4E00, radical 214 at U+9FA0) but did not encode all characters found in the Kangxi dictionary. Individual characters were listed based on their Kangxi radical and number of additional strokes, e.g. U+5382 厂, the unaugmented radical 27 meaning "cliff" is listed under "27.0", while U+5383 to U+5386 are listed under "27.2" as they all consist of radical 27 plus two additional strokes. More characters were added in later versions, adding "CJK Unified Ideographs Extensions" A, B, C, D, E and F as of Unicode 12.1 (2019) with further additions planned for Unicode 13.0. Within each "Extension", characters are also ordered by Kangxi radical and additional strokes. The Unicode Consortium maintains the "Unihan Database", with a Radical-Stroke-Index. The Unicode Common Locale Data Repository provides no official collation (sort order) rule for Unicode CJK characters (short of sorting characters by code point); such collation rules as there are language-specific (such as JIS X 0208 for Japanese kanji) and do not include any of the CJK Unified Ideographs Extension characters.

== Chart ==
Kangxi Radicals^{[1]}^{[2]} Official Unicode Consortium code chart (PDF)
	0	1	2	3	4	5	6	7	8	9	A	B	C	D	E	F
U+2F0x	⼀	⼁	⼂	⼃	⼄	⼅	⼆	⼇	⼈	⼉	⼊	⼋	⼌	⼍	⼎	⼏
U+2F1x	⼐	⼑	⼒	⼓	⼔	⼕	⼖	⼗	⼘	⼙	⼚	⼛	⼜	⼝	⼞	⼟
U+2F2x	⼠	⼡	⼢	⼣	⼤	⼥	⼦	⼧	⼨	⼩	⼪	⼫	⼬	⼭	⼮	⼯
U+2F3x	⼰	⼱	⼲	⼳	⼴	⼵	⼶	⼷	⼸	⼹	⼺	⼻	⼼	⼽	⼾	⼿
U+2F4x	⽀	⽁	⽂	⽃	⽄	⽅	⽆	⽇	⽈	⽉	⽊	⽋	⽌	⽍	⽎	⽏
U+2F5x	⽐	⽑	⽒	⽓	⽔	⽕	⽖	⽗	⽘	⽙	⽚	⽛	⽜	⽝	⽞	⽟
U+2F6x	⽠	⽡	⽢	⽣	⽤	⽥	⽦	⽧	⽨	⽩	⽪	⽫	⽬	⽭	⽮	⽯
U+2F7x	⽰	⽱	⽲	⽳	⽴	⽵	⽶	⽷	⽸	⽹	⽺	⽻	⽼	⽽	⽾	⽿
U+2F8x	⾀	⾁	⾂	⾃	⾄	⾅	⾆	⾇	⾈	⾉	⾊	⾋	⾌	⾍	⾎	⾏
U+2F9x	⾐	⾑	⾒	⾓	⾔	⾕	⾖	⾗	⾘	⾙	⾚	⾛	⾜	⾝	⾞	⾟
U+2FAx	⾠	⾡	⾢	⾣	⾤	⾥	⾦	⾧	⾨	⾩	⾪	⾫	⾬	⾭	⾮	⾯
U+2FBx	⾰	⾱	⾲	⾳	⾴	⾵	⾶	⾷	⾸	⾹	⾺	⾻	⾼	⾽	⾾	⾿
U+2FCx	⿀	⿁	⿂	⿃	⿄	⿅	⿆	⿇	⿈	⿉	⿊	⿋	⿌	⿍	⿎	⿏
U+2FDx	⿐	⿑	⿒	⿓	⿔	⿕										
Notes 1.As of Unicode version 17.0 2.Grey areas indicate non-assigned code points

== History ==
The following Unicode-related documents record the purpose and process of defining specific characters in the Kangxi Radicals block:

Version	Final code points (Note: Proposed code points and characters names may differ from final code points and names)	Count	L2 ID	WG2 ID	IRG ID	Document
3.0	U+2F00..2FD5	214	L2/97-017	N1182	N202	Proposal to add 210 KangXi Radicals and 3 HANGZHOU Numbers in BMP for compatibility, 1995-03-23
3.0	U+2F00..2FD5	214		N1203		Umamaheswaran, V. S.; Ksar, Mike (1995-05-03), "6.1.11", Unconfirmed minutes of SC2/WG2 Meeting 27, Geneva
3.0	U+2F00..2FD5	214		N1303 (html, doc)		Umamaheswaran, V. S.; Ksar, Mike (1996-01-26), Minutes of Meeting 29, Tokyo
3.0	U+2F00..2FD5	214	L2/97-030	N1503 (pdf, doc)		Umamaheswaran, V. S.; Ksar, Mike (1997-04-01), "8.10", Unconfirmed Minutes of WG 2 Meeting #32, Singapore; 1997-01-20--24
3.0	U+2F00..2FD5	214			N449	Jenkins, John; Wang, Xiaoming (1997-04-14), Naming of Kangxi Radicals
3.0	U+2F00..2FD5	214	L2/97-154	N1609	N479	Zhang, Zhoucai (1997-06-27), Kangxi Radicals
3.0	U+2F00..2FD5	214	L2/97-284	N1629	N486	Zhang, Zhoucai (1997-07-07), Kangxi Radicals and Hangzhou Numerals
3.0	U+2F00..2FD5	214	L2/98-112	N1629R		Zhang, Zhoucai (1998-03-19), Kangxi Radicals, Hangzhou Numerals
3.0	U+2F00..2FD5	214	L2/98-332	N1923		Combined PDAM registration and consideration ballot on WD for ISO/IEC 10646-1/Amd. 15, AMENDMENT 15: Kang Xi radicals and CJK radicals supplement, 1998-10-28
3.0	U+2F00..2FD5	214	L2/99-010	N1903 (pdf, html, doc)		Umamaheswaran, V. S. (1998-12-30), "10.4", Minutes of WG 2 meeting 35, London, U.K.; 1998-09-21--25
3.0	U+2F00..2FD5	214			N616	Jenkins, John (1999-01-04), KangXi Radical Names
3.0	U+2F00..2FD5	214	L2/99-073.1	N1969		Irish Comments on SC 2 N 3213, 1999-01-19
3.0	U+2F00..2FD5	214	L2/99-073	N1968 (html, doc)		Summary of Voting on SC 2 N 3213, PDAM ballot on WD for 10646-1/Amd. 15: Kang Xi radicals and CJK radicals supplement, 1999-02-08
3.0	U+2F00..2FD5	214	L2/99-119			Text for FPDAM ballot of ISO/IEC 10646, Amd. 15 - Kang Xi radicals and CJK radicals supplement, 1999-04-07
3.0	U+2F00..2FD5	214	L2/99-232	N2003		Umamaheswaran, V. S. (1999-08-03), Minutes of WG 2 meeting 36, Fukuoka, Japan, 1999-03-09--15
3.0	U+2F00..2FD5	214	L2/99-252	N2065		Summary of Voting on SC 2 N 3311, ISO 10646-1/FPDAM 15 - Kang Xi radicals and CJK radicals supplement, 1999-08-19
3.0	U+2F00..2FD5	214	L2/99-300	N2122		Paterson, Bruce (1999-09-21), Revised Text for FDAM ballot of ISO/IEC 10646-1/FDAM 15, AMENDMENT 15: Kang Xi radicals and CJK radicals supplement
3.0	U+2F00..2FD5	214	L2/00-010	N2103		Umamaheswaran, V. S. (2000-01-05), Minutes of WG 2 meeting 37, Copenhagen, Denmark: 1999-09-13—16
3.0	U+2F00..2FD5	214	L2/00-044			Summary of FDAM voting: ISO 10646 Amendment 15: Kang Xi radicals and CJK radicals supplement, 2000-01-31
3.0	U+2F00..2FD5	214	L2/02-436	N2534	N955	IRG Radical Classification, 2002-11-21
3.0	U+2F00..2FD5	214	L2/03-362	N2659	N981	Cook, Richard (2003-10-15), Defect Report on Kangxi Radical Forms
3.0	U+2F00..2FD5	214	L2/04-423	N2882		Cook, Richard (2004-11-18), Defect Report on Kangxi Radical Forms, revisited
3.0	U+2F00..2FD5	214	L2/19-175			Jenkins, John H. (2019-04-25), Glyph for U+2F2A KANGXI RADICAL LAME
3.0	U+2F00..2FD5	214		N5079	N2371	Jenkins, John H. (2019-05-03), Glyph for U+2F2A KANGXI RADICAL LAME
3.0	U+2F00..2FD5	214	L2/19-122			Moore, Lisa (2019-05-08), "B.4.3 Glyph for U+2F2A KANGXI RADICAL LAME", UTC #159 Minutes
3.0	U+2F00..2FD5	214	L2/19-237	N5068		Editorial Report on Miscellaneous Issues (meeting IRG#52) [Affects U+2F2A], 2019-05-17
3.0	U+2F00..2FD5	214		N5122		"M68.12", Unconfirmed minutes of WG 2 meeting 68, 2019-12-31
3.0	U+2F00..2FD5	214	L2/19-212R	N5069R		Lunde, Ken (2019-06-20), Proposal to change the font for the CJK Radicals Supplement & Kangxi Radicals blocks
3.0	U+2F00..2FD5	214	L2/19-270			Moore, Lisa (2019-10-07), "B.4.4 Proposal to change the font for the CJK Radicals Supplement and Kangxi Radicals blocks", UTC #160 Minutes
