= Radical 44 =

Chinese character radical

尸
- Radical 44 (U+2F2B)
- 尸 (U+5C38) "corpse"

Pronunciations
- Pinyin: shī
- Bopomofo: ㄕ
- Gwoyeu Romatzyh: shy
- Wade–Giles: shih^{1}
- Cantonese Yale: sī
- Jyutping: si1
- Pe̍h-ōe-jī: si
- Japanese Kana: シ shi (on'yomi) しかばね shikabane (kun'yomi)
- Sino-Korean: 시 si

Names
- Chinese name(s): 尸字頭/尸字头 shīzìtóu
- Japanese name(s): 尸/しかばね shikabane 尸冠/しかばねかんむり shikabanekanmuri 尸/かばね kabane 尸垂/かばねだれ kabanedare
- Hangul: 주검 jugeom

Stroke order animation

Radical 44 or radical corpse (尸部) meaning "corpse" is one of the 31 Kangxi radicals (214 radicals total) composed of three strokes.

In the Kangxi Dictionary, there are 148 characters (out of 49,030) to be found under this radical.

尸 is also the 51st indexing component in the Table of Indexing Chinese Character Components predominantly adopted by Simplified Chinese dictionaries published in mainland China.

== Evolution ==
Compare 人 and 匕.

Shang dynasty Oracle bone script

Shang dynasty bronze script

Western Zhou bronze script

Qin slip script

Large seal script

Small seal script

=== 尺 (length unit) ===
Warring States bronze script

Qin slip script

Large seal script

Small seal script

=== 尹 ===
Hand (又) holding a stick, similar to 父, 支, 攴, 殳, and 皮.

Oracle bone script

Shang dynasty bronze script

Western Zhou bronze script

Small seal script

== Derived characters ==
Strokes	Characters
+0	尸 (also SC form of 屍)
+1	尹 尺
+2	尻 尼
+3	尽^{SC/JP} (=盡 -> 皿)
+4	尾 尿 局 屁 层^{SC} (=層) 屃^{SC} (=屓=屭)
+5	屄 居 屆 屇 屈 屉^{SC} (=屜) 届^{SC/JP} (=屆)
+6	屋 屌 屍 屎 屏
+7	屐 屑^{SC/TC/JP 83JIS}/屑^{JP JIS 2004/KO} 屒 屓 (=屭) 屔 展 屖 屗 屘
+8	屙 屚 (=漏 -> 水) 屛^{Kangxi} (=屏) 屜 屝 屠^{SC/TC/JP 83JIS variant}
+9	屠^{JP JIS 2004/KO variant} 属^{SC/JP} (=屬) 屟 屡 (SC/JP, 屢)
+11	屢 屣 層^{JP}
+12	層^{TC}/層^{KO} 履 屦^{SC} (=屨) 屧
+14	屨
+15	屩 屪
+16	屫
+18	屬
+21	屭

== Literature ==
- Fazzioli, Edoardo (1987). Chinese calligraphy : from pictograph to ideogram : the history of 214 essential Chinese/Japanese characters. calligraphy by Rebecca Hon Ko. New York: Abbeville Press. ISBN 0-89659-774-1.
- Lunde, Ken (Jan 5, 2009). "Appendix J: Japanese Character Sets" (PDF). CJKV Information Processing: Chinese, Japanese, Korean & Vietnamese Computing (Second ed.). Sebastopol, Calif.: O'Reilly Media. ISBN 978-0-596-51447-1.
