= Radical 25 =

Chinese character radical

卜
- Radical 25 (U+2F18)
- 卜 (U+535C) "divination"

Pronunciations
- Pinyin: bǔ
- Bopomofo: ㄅㄨˇ
- Wade–Giles: pu3
- Cantonese Yale: būk
- Jyutping: buk1
- Pe̍h-ōe-jī: poh (col.) pok (lit.)
- Japanese Kana: ボク boku (on'yomi) うらな-う urana-u (kun'yomi)
- Sino-Korean: 복 bok
- Hán-Việt: bốc

Names
- Japanese name(s): 卜のト/ぼくのと bokunoto 占い/うらない uranai ト/と to
- Hangul: 점 cheom

Stroke order animation

Radical 25 or radical divination (卜部) is one of the 23 Kangxi radicals (214 radicals total) composed of two strokes.

In the Kangxi Dictionary, there are 45 characters (out of 49,030) to be found under this radical.

卜 is also the 9th indexing component in the Table of Indexing Chinese Character Components predominantly adopted by Simplified Chinese dictionaries published in mainland China. ⺊ is the only associated indexing component affiliated to the principal indexing component 卜.

In addition, 卜 is also the simplified form of 蔔 meaning "radish" or "carrot".

== Evolution ==
Component of 攴; unrelated to katakata ト (to) which is from 止.

Shang dynasty oracle bone script

Western Zhou bronze script

Chu slip and silk script

Qin slip script

Large seal script character

Small seal script character

== Derived characters ==
Strokes	Characters
+0	卜 ⺊
+2	卝 卞
+3	卟 占 卡 卢^{SC} (=盧 -> 皿)
+5	卣 卤^{SC} (=鹵 -> 鹵)
+6	卥 卦
+7	卧^{SC/HK} (=臥 -> 臣)
+9	卨

== Literature ==
- Fazzioli, Edoardo (1987). Chinese calligraphy : from pictograph to ideogram : the history of 214 essential Chinese/Japanese characters. calligraphy by Rebecca Hon Ko. New York: Abbeville Press. ISBN 0-89659-774-1.
- Lunde, Ken (Jan 5, 2009). "Appendix J: Japanese Character Sets" (PDF). CJKV Information Processing: Chinese, Japanese, Korean & Vietnamese Computing (Second ed.). Sebastopol, Calif.: O'Reilly Media. ISBN 978-0-596-51447-1.
