= Radical 42 =

Chinese character radical

小
- Radical 42 (U+2F29)
- 小 (U+5C0F) "small, insignificant"

Pronunciations
- Pinyin: xiǎo
- Bopomofo: ㄒㄧㄠˇ
- Gwoyeu Romatzyh: sheau
- Wade–Giles: hsiao^{3}
- Cantonese Yale: síu
- Jyutping: siu2
- Pe̍h-ōe-jī: siáu
- Japanese Kana: ショウ shō (on'yomi) ちい-さい chii-sai (kun'yomi)
- Sino-Korean: 소 so

Names
- Chinese name(s): (Top) 小字頭/小字头 xiǎozìtóu
- Japanese name(s): 小/しょう shō (Top) 小頭/しょうがしら shōgashira (Top) 尚頭/なおがしら naogashira
- Hangul: 작을 jageul

Stroke order animation

Radical 42 or radical small (小部) meaning "small" or "insignificant" is one of the 31 Kangxi radicals (214 radicals total) composed of three strokes.

In the Kangxi Dictionary, there are 41 characters (out of 49,030) to be found under this radical.

小 is also the 36th indexing component in the Table of Indexing Chinese Character Components predominantly adopted by Simplified Chinese dictionaries published in mainland China. Its inversed form ⺌ is the associated indexing component affiliated to the principal indexing component 小.

== Evolution ==
=== 小 ===
Oracle bone script

Bronze script

Qin slip script

Large seal script

Small seal script

=== 少 ===
Unrelated to lower part of 步 which is 止.

Oracle bone script

=== 尔 (you; trad:爾) ===
Oracle bone script

Bronze script

Chu slip and silk script

Small seal script

== Derived characters ==
Strokes	Characters
+0	小
+1	尐 少
+2	尒 (=爾 -> 爻) 尓 (=爾) 尔^{SC} (=爾) 尕
+3	尖 尗 尘^{SC} (=塵 -> 土) 当^{SC/JP} (=當 -> 田)
+5	尙^{Kangxi/KO} (=尚) 尚
+6	尛 尜 尝^{SC} (=嘗/嚐 -> 口)
+9	尞
+10	尟 尠
+11	尡

== Sinogram ==
The radical is also used as an independent Chinese character. It is one of the kyōiku kanji or kanji taught in elementary school in Japan. It is a first grade kanji.

== Literature ==
- Fazzioli, Edoardo (1987). Chinese calligraphy : from pictograph to ideogram : the history of 214 essential Chinese/Japanese characters. calligraphy by Rebecca Hon Ko. New York: Abbeville Press. ISBN 0-89659-774-1.
- Lunde, Ken (Jan 5, 2009). "Appendix J: Japanese Character Sets" (PDF). CJKV Information Processing: Chinese, Japanese, Korean & Vietnamese Computing (Second ed.). Sebastopol, Calif.: O'Reilly Media. ISBN 978-0-596-51447-1.
