= Radical 56 =

Chinese character radical

弋
- Radical 56 (U+2F37)
- 弋 (U+5F0B) "shoot, arrow"

Pronunciations
- Pinyin: yì
- Bopomofo: ㄧˋ
- Wade–Giles: i4
- Cantonese Yale: yihk
- Jyutping: jik6
- Pe̍h-ōe-jī: e̍k
- Japanese Kana: ヨク yoku (on'yomi) いぐるみ igurumi (kun'yomi)
- Sino-Korean: 익 ik

Names
- Japanese name(s): 式構/しきがまえ shikigamae
- Hangul: 주살 jusal

Stroke order animation

Radical 56 or radical shoot (弋部) meaning "shoot" or "arrow" is one of the 31 Kangxi radicals (214 radicals in total) composed of three strokes.

In the Kangxi Dictionary, there are 15 characters (out of 49,030) to be found under this radical.

弋 is also the 35th indexing component in the Table of Indexing Chinese Character Components predominantly adopted by Simplified Chinese dictionaries published in mainland China.

== Evolution ==
Compare 才 and 戈.

Oracle bone script character

Bronze script character

Chu slip and silk script

Large seal script character

Small seal script character

== Derived characters ==
Strokes	Characters
+0	弋
+1	弌 (=一 -> 一, one)
+2	弍 (=二 -> 二 / 貳 -> Radical , two)
+3	弎 (=三 -> 一, three) 式 (type, ceremony, formula, etc.) 弐 (=貳 -> 貝)
+9	弑^{SC/variant} (=弒)
+10	弒 (to murder one's sovereign or parents)

== Literature ==
- Fazzioli, Edoardo (1987). Chinese calligraphy : from pictograph to ideogram : the history of 214 essential Chinese/Japanese characters. calligraphy by Rebecca Hon Ko. New York: Abbeville Press. ISBN 0-89659-774-1.
- Lunde, Ken (Jan 5, 2009). "Appendix J: Japanese Character Sets" (PDF). CJKV Information Processing: Chinese, Japanese, Korean & Vietnamese Computing (Second ed.). Sebastopol, Calif.: O'Reilly Media. ISBN 978-0-596-51447-1.
