= Radical 81 =

Chinese character radical

比
- Radical 81 (U+2F50)
- 比 (U+6BD4) "compare, compete"

Pronunciations
- Pinyin: bǐ
- Bopomofo: ㄅㄧˇ
- Wade–Giles: pi3
- Cantonese Yale: béi
- Jyutping: bei2
- Pe̍h-ōe-jī: pí
- Japanese Kana: ヒ hi (on'yomi) くら-べる kura-beru (kun'yomi)
- Sino-Korean: 비 bi

Names
- Chinese name(s): (Top) 比字頭/比字头 bǐzìtóu (Bottom) 比字底 bǐzìdǐ
- Japanese name(s): 並びヒ/ならびひ narabihi 比べる/くらべる kuraberu
- Hangul: 견줄 gyeonjul

Stroke order animation

Radical 81 or radical compare (比部) meaning "compare" or "compete" is one of the 34 Kangxi radicals (214 radicals in total) composed of 4 strokes.

In the Kangxi Dictionary, there are 21 characters (out of 49,030) to be found under this radical.

比 is also the 71st indexing component in the Table of Indexing Chinese Character Components predominantly adopted by Simplified Chinese dictionaries published in mainland China.

== Evolution ==
匕+匕; compare 化 and 北; mirror of 从; unrelated to 此 (止+匕).

Oracle bone script

Bronze script

Chu slip and silk script

Shuowen ancient script

Large seal script

Small seal script

== Derived characters ==
比 is the source of ひ and ヒ, both kana for hi.

| Strokes | Characters |
|---|---|
| +0 | 比 |
| +2 | 毕^{SC} (=畢 -> 田) |
| +5 | 毖 毗 毘 |
| +6 | 毙^{SC} (=斃 -> 攴) |
| +13 | 毚 |

== Literature ==
- Fazzioli, Edoardo (1987). Chinese calligraphy : from pictograph to ideogram : the history of 214 essential Chinese/Japanese characters. calligraphy by Rebecca Hon Ko. New York: Abbeville Press. ISBN 0-89659-774-1.
- Lunde, Ken (Jan 5, 2009). "Appendix J: Japanese Character Sets" (PDF). CJKV Information Processing: Chinese, Japanese, Korean & Vietnamese Computing (Second ed.). Sebastopol, Calif.: O'Reilly Media. ISBN 978-0-596-51447-1.
