= Radical 79 =

Chinese character radical

殳
- Radical 79 (U+2F4E)
- 殳 (U+6BB3) "weapon, lance"

Pronunciations
- Pinyin: shū
- Bopomofo: ㄕㄨ
- Wade–Giles: shu1
- Cantonese Yale: syùh
- Jyutping: syu4
- Pe̍h-ōe-jī: sû
- Japanese Kana: シュ shu (on'yomi) ほこ hoko (kun'yomi)
- Sino-Korean: 수 su

Names
- Japanese name(s): 殳/ほこ hoko 殳旁/ほこづくり hokozukuri ル又/るまた rumata
- Hangul: 칠 chil

Stroke order animation

Radical 79 or radical weapon (殳部) meaning "weapon" or "lance" is one of the 34 Kangxi radicals (214 radicals in total) composed of 4 strokes.

In the Kangxi Dictionary, there are 93 characters (out of 49,030) to be found under this radical.

殳 is also the 92nd indexing component in the Table of Indexing Chinese Character Components predominantly adopted by Simplified Chinese dictionaries published in mainland China.

== Evolution ==
A hand (又) with a tool (⼏); compare 支, 攴 and 父.

Oracle bone script

Bronze script

Chu slip and silk script

Qin slip script

Large seal script

Small seal script

== Derived characters ==
Strokes	Characters
+0	殳
+3	没
+5	殴^{SC/JP} (=毆) 段 殶
+6	殷 殸 殹 殺
+7	殻^{JP/GB TC/variant} (=殼)
+8	殼 殽
+9	殾 殿 毀 毁^{SC} (=毀) 毂^{SC} (=轂 -> 車)
+10	毃 毄
+11	毅 毆
+12	毇 毈
+15	毉
+19	毊

== Literature ==
- Fazzioli, Edoardo (1987). Chinese calligraphy : from pictograph to ideogram : the history of 214 essential Chinese/Japanese characters. calligraphy by Rebecca Hon Ko. New York: Abbeville Press. ISBN 0-89659-774-1.
- Lunde, Ken (Jan 5, 2009). "Appendix J: Japanese Character Sets" (PDF). CJKV Information Processing: Chinese, Japanese, Korean & Vietnamese Computing (Second ed.). Sebastopol, Calif.: O'Reilly Media. ISBN 978-0-596-51447-1.
