= Radical 16 =

Chinese character radical

几
- Radical 16 (U+2F0F)
- 几 (U+51E0) "small table"

Pronunciations
- Pinyin: jī
- Bopomofo: ㄐ一
- Wade–Giles: chi1
- Cantonese Yale: gei1
- Jyutping: gei1
- Pe̍h-ōe-jī: kí
- Japanese Kana: キ ki (on'yomi) つくえ tsukue (kun'yomi)
- Sino-Korean: 궤 gwe
- Hán-Việt: kỷ

Names
- Chinese name(s): (Surrounding) 几字頭/几子头 jīzìtóu (Bottom) 几字底 jīzìdǐ
- Japanese name(s): 机/つくえ tsukue 几繞/きにょう kinyō 几構/きがまえ/つくえがまえ kigamae/tsukuegamae 風構/かぜがまえ/かざがまえ kazegamae/kazagamae
- Hangul: 안석 anseok

Stroke order animation

Radical 16 or radical table (几部), meaning small table, is one of 23 of the 214 Kangxi radicals that are composed of 2 strokes.

几 is also the 16th indexing component in the Table of Indexing Chinese Character Components predominantly adopted by Simplified Chinese dictionaries published in mainland China. 𠘨 is an associated indexing component affiliated to the principal component 几. In addition, the identical character 几 used in Simplified Chinese for 幾 jǐ used to ask "how many" for small amounts or to mean "a few, some, almost, nearly" does not have any historical connection to the "table" character.

In the Kangxi Dictionary, there are 38 characters (out of 49,030) to be found under this radical.

== Evolution ==
=== 几 ===
Chu bamboo and slip script character

Shuowen seal script character

Liushutong character

=== 凡 ===
Component of 風 (凡+虫) and 鳳 (凡+⿃).

Shang dynasty oracle bone script

Shang dynasty bronze script

Western Zhou bronze script

Chu slip and silk script

Qin slip script

Large seal script character

Small seal script character

== Derived characters ==
Strokes	Characters
+0	几
+1	凡 凢 (=凡) 凣 (=凡)
+2	凤^{SC} (=鳳 -> 鳥)
+3	凥 処^{JP} (=處 -> 虍) 凧^{JP}
+4	凨 (=風 -> 風) 凩^{JP} 凪^{JP} 凫^{SC} (=鳧 -> 鳥)
+5	凬
+6	凭 凮 凯^{SC} (=凱)
+7	巬
+9	凰
+10	凱 凲
+12	凳 凴 (=憑 -> 心)

== Literature ==
- Fazzioli, Edoardo (1987). Chinese calligraphy : from pictograph to ideogram : the history of 214 essential Chinese/Japanese characters. calligraphy by Rebecca Hon Ko. New York: Abbeville Press. ISBN 0-89659-774-1.
- Leyi Li: “Tracing the Roots of Chinese Characters: 500 Cases”. Beijing 1993, ISBN 978-7-5619-0204-2
- KangXi: page 133, character 16
