= Radical 165 =

Chinese character radical

釆
- Radical 165 (U+2FA4)
- 釆 (U+91C6) "distinguish"

Pronunciations
- Pinyin: biàn
- Bopomofo: ㄅㄧㄢˋ
- Wade–Giles: pien4
- Cantonese Yale: bin6
- Jyutping: bin6
- Japanese Kana: ハン han / ベン ben (on'yomi) わかれる wakareru (kun'yomi)
- Sino-Korean: 변 byeon
- Hán-Việt: biện

Names
- Japanese name(s): ノ米/のごめ nogome ノ米偏/のごめへん nogomehen
- Hangul: 분별할 bunbyeolhal

Stroke order animation

Radical 165 or radical distinguish (釆部) meaning "distinguish" is one of the 20 Kangxi radicals (214 radicals in total) composed of 7 strokes.

In the Kangxi Dictionary, there are 14 characters (out of 49,030) to be found under this radical.

釆 is also the 161st indexing component in the Table of Indexing Chinese Character Components predominantly adopted by Simplified Chinese dictionaries published in mainland China.

== Evolution ==
Oracle bone script character

Bronze script character

Large seal script character

Small seal script character

== Derived characters ==
Strokes	Characters
+0	釆
+1	采 (also SC form of 採 -> 手)
+4	釈^{JP} (=釋)
+5	釉 释^{SC} (=釋)
+13	釋

== Literature ==
- Fazzioli, Edoardo (1987). Chinese calligraphy : from pictograph to ideogram : the history of 214 essential Chinese/Japanese characters. calligraphy by Rebecca Hon Ko. New York: Abbeville Press. ISBN 0-89659-774-1.
- Lunde, Ken (Jan 5, 2009). "Appendix J: Japanese Character Sets" (PDF). CJKV Information Processing: Chinese, Japanese, Korean & Vietnamese Computing (Second ed.). Sebastopol, Calif.: O'Reilly Media. ISBN 978-0-596-51447-1.
