= Radical 65 =

Chinese character radical

支
- Radical 65 (U+2F40)
- 支 (U+652F) "branch"

Pronunciations
- Pinyin: zhī
- Bopomofo: ㄓ
- Wade–Giles: chih1
- Cantonese Yale: jī
- Jyutping: zi1
- Pe̍h-ōe-jī: chi
- Japanese Kana: シ shi (on'yomi) ささ-える sasa-eru (kun'yomi)
- Sino-Korean: 지 ji

Names
- Chinese name(s): 支字旁 zhīzìpáng 支字底 zhīzìdǐ
- Japanese name(s): 支える/ささえる 支繞/しにょう shinyō 枝繞/えだにょう edanyō 十又/じゅうまた jūmata
- Hangul: 지탱할 jitaenghal

Stroke order animation

Radical 65 or radical branch (支部) meaning "branch" is one of the 34 Kangxi radicals (214 radicals in total) composed of 4 strokes.

In the Kangxi Dictionary, there are 26 characters (out of 49,030) to be found under this radical.

支 is also the 65th indexing component in the Table of Indexing Chinese Character Components predominantly adopted by Simplified Chinese dictionaries published in mainland China.

== Evolution ==
A hand (又) holding a bamboo branch (half of 竹), similar to 攴, 殳, 父, and 皮. Component of 鼓.

Chu slip and silk script

Large seal script

Small seal script

== Derived characters ==
Strokes	Characters
+0	支
+2	攰
+5	攱
+8	攲
+12	攳

== Sinogram ==
In the Japanese educational system the character 支 is a Kyōiku kanji or Kanji taught in elementary school. It is a fifth grade kanji.

== Literature ==
- Fazzioli, Edoardo (1987). Chinese calligraphy : from pictograph to ideogram : the history of 214 essential Chinese/Japanese characters. calligraphy by Rebecca Hon Ko. New York: Abbeville Press. ISBN 0-89659-774-1.
- Lunde, Ken (Jan 5, 2009). "Appendix J: Japanese Character Sets" (PDF). CJKV Information Processing: Chinese, Japanese, Korean & Vietnamese Computing (Second ed.). Sebastopol, Calif.: O'Reilly Media. ISBN 978-0-596-51447-1.
