= Radical 135 =

Chinese character radical

舌
- Radical 135 (U+2F86)
- 舌 (U+820C) "tongue"

Pronunciations
- Pinyin: shé
- Bopomofo: ㄕㄜˊ
- Wade–Giles: she2
- Cantonese Yale: sit6
- Jyutping: sit6, sit3
- Japanese Kana: セツ setsu / ゼチ zechi (on'yomi) した shita (kun'yomi)
- Sino-Korean: 설 seol

Names
- Chinese name(s): (Left) 舌字旁 shézìpáng
- Japanese name(s): 舌/した shita
- Hangul: 혀 hyeo

Stroke order animation

Radical 135 or radical tongue (舌部) meaning "tongue" is one of the 29 Kangxi radicals (214 radicals in total) composed of 6 strokes.

In the Kangxi Dictionary, there are 31 characters (out of 49,030) to be found under this radical.

舌 is also the 134th indexing component in the Table of Indexing Chinese Character Components predominantly adopted by Simplified Chinese dictionaries published in mainland China.

== Evolution ==
口 ("mouth") with a forked tongue; unrelated to 舍.

Oracle bone script

Shang dynasty Bronze script

Large seal script

Small seal script

=== 舍 ===
Phonetic 余 (OC *la) + semantic 口.

Western Zhou Bronze script

Large seal script

Small seal script

== Derived characters ==
Strokes	Characters
+0	舌
+2	舍 舎^{JP} (=舍) 舏
+4	舐
+5	舑
+6	舒
+8	舓 (=舐) 舔 舕
+9	舖 (=鋪 -> 金) 舗
+10	舘 (=館 -> 食)
+12	舙 (=話 -> 言 / 咠 -> 口)
+13	舚

== Variant forms ==
In the Kangxi Dictionary and in modern Traditional Chinese used in Hong Kong and Taiwan, this radical character begins with a horizontal stroke, while in other languages, it begins with a left-falling stroke.

Kangxi Dictionary Modern Trad. Chinese	Simp. Chinese Japanese Korean
舌	舌

== Sinogram ==
The radical is also used as an independent Chinese character. It is one of the Kyōiku kanji or Kanji taught in elementary school in Japan. It is a fifth grade kanji.

== Literature ==
- Fazzioli, Edoardo (1987). Chinese calligraphy : from pictograph to ideogram : the history of 214 essential Chinese/Japanese characters. calligraphy by Rebecca Hon Ko. New York: Abbeville Press. ISBN 0-89659-774-1.
- Lunde, Ken (Jan 5, 2009). "Appendix J: Japanese Character Sets" (PDF). CJKV Information Processing: Chinese, Japanese, Korean & Vietnamese Computing (Second ed.). Sebastopol, Calif.: O'Reilly Media. ISBN 978-0-596-51447-1.
