= Radical 77 =

Chinese character radical

止
- Radical 77 (U+2F4C)
- 止 (U+6B62) "stop"

Pronunciations
- Pinyin: zhǐ
- Bopomofo: ㄓˇ
- Gwoyeu Romatzyh: jyy
- Wade–Giles: chih^{3}
- Cantonese Yale: jí
- Jyutping: zi2
- Pe̍h-ōe-jī: chí
- Japanese Kana: シ shi (on'yomi) と-まる to-maru / と-める to-meru / や-める ya-meru (kun'yomi)
- Sino-Korean: 지 ji

Names
- Japanese name(s): 止める/とめる tomeru 止偏/とめへん tomehen
- Hangul: 그칠 geuchil

Stroke order animation

Radical 77 or radical stop (止部) meaning "stop" is one of the 34 Kangxi radicals (214 radicals in total) composed of 4 strokes.

In the Kangxi Dictionary, there are 99 characters (out of 49,030) to be found under this radical.

止 is also the 73rd indexing component in the Table of Indexing Chinese Character Components predominantly adopted by Simplified Chinese dictionaries published in mainland China.

== Evolution ==
=== 止 ===
Component of 疋, 走, 足, and 辵; compare 夂 and 夊.

Oracle bone script

Oracle bone script variant

Shang dynasty Bronze script

Western Zhou bronze script

Chu slip and silk script

Qin slip script

Large seal script

Small seal script

=== 正 ===
Phono-semantic compound: phonetic 丁 (*tˤeŋ) + semantic 止

Oracle bone script

Shang dynasty Bronze script

Western Zhou bronze script

Large seal script

Small seal script

Han dynasty clerical script

=== 步 ===
Compare 比, 舛, 韋. Bottom part unrelated to 少.

Western Zhou bronze script

== Derived characters ==
Strokes	Characters
+0	止
+1	正
+2	此
+3	步
+4	武 歧 歨 (=步) 歩^{JP} (=步)
+5	歪 歫
+6	歬 (=前 -> 刀) 歭
+8	歮
+9	歰 歱 歲 歳^{JP} (=歲)
+10	歴^{JP} (=歷)
+11	歵 歶
+12	歷
+14	歸

== Sinogram ==
The radical is also used as an independent Chinese character. It is one of the kyōiku kanji or kanji taught in elementary school in Japan. It is a second grade kanji.

== Literature ==
- Fazzioli, Edoardo (1987). Chinese calligraphy : from pictograph to ideogram : the history of 214 essential Chinese/Japanese characters. calligraphy by Rebecca Hon Ko. New York: Abbeville Press. ISBN 0-89659-774-1.
- Lunde, Ken (Jan 5, 2009). "Appendix J: Japanese Character Sets" (PDF). CJKV Information Processing: Chinese, Japanese, Korean & Vietnamese Computing (Second ed.). Sebastopol, Calif.: O'Reilly Media. ISBN 978-0-596-51447-1.
