= Radical 1 =

Kangxi radical

一
- Radical 1 (U+2F00)
- 一 (U+4E00) "one"

Pronunciations
- Pinyin: yī
- Bopomofo: 一
- Gwoyeu Romatzyh: i
- Wade–Giles: i^{1}
- Cantonese Yale: yāt
- Jyutping: jat1
- Pe̍h-ōe-jī: it
- Japanese Kana: イチ ichi (on'yomi) ひと(つ) hito(tsu) (kun'yomi)
- Sino-Korean: 일 il
- Hán-Việt: 一 nhất

Names
- Chinese name(s): 橫/横 héng
- Japanese name(s): 一 ichi
- Hangul: 한 han

Stroke order animation

Radical 1 or radical one (一部) meaning "one" is one of the 6 Kangxi radicals (214 radicals in total) composed of 1 stroke. It is the simplest Chinese character in the language due to consisting of only one line.

In the Kangxi Dictionary, there are 60 characters (out of 47,043) to be found under this radical.

一 is also the 1st indexing component in the Table of Indexing Chinese Character Components predominantly adopted by Simplified Chinese dictionaries published in mainland China.

== Evolution ==
Shang dynasty Oracle bone script

Shang dynasty Bronze script

Western Zhou oracle script

Western Zhou Bronze script

Spring and Autumn period bronze script

Warring States period bronze script

Chu slip and silk script

Qin slip script

Large seal script character

Small seal script character

Qing dynasty Clerical script

== Derived characters ==
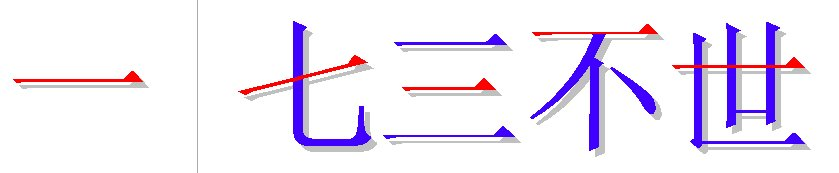
Some Chinese characters with Radical 1

| Strokes | Characters (Note: Not all possible characters are listed in this table. See Wiktionary.) |
|---|---|
| +0 | 一 |
| +1 | 丁 丂 七 丄 丅 丆 |
| +2 | 万 (also SC/JP form of 萬 -> 艸) 丈 三 上 下 丌 与^{SC}/与^{JP} (also SC/JP form of 與 -> 臼) |
| +3 | 不 丏 丐 丑^{SC/JP}/丑^{TC} (also SC form of 醜 -> 酉) 丒 (=丑) 专^{SC} (=專 -> 寸) |
| +4 | 且 丕 世 丘 丙 业^{SC} (=業 -> 木) 丛^{SC} (=叢 => 又) 东^{SC} (=東 -> 木) 丝^{SC} (=絲 -> 糸) |
| +5 | 丞 丟 丠 両^{JP} (=兩 -> 入) |
| +6 | 丣 两^{SC} (=兩 -> 入) 严^{SC} (=嚴 -> 口) |
| +7 | 並 丧^{SC} (=喪 -> 口) |

== In calligraphy ==
The horizontal line as in 永

The only stroke in radical one, known as 橫/横 héng "horizontal", is called 策 cè in the eight principles of the character 永 (永字八法 Yǒngzì Bāfǎ) which are the basis of Chinese calligraphy.

== Sinogram ==
As an isolated character it is one of the Kyōiku kanji or Kanji taught in elementary school in Japan. It is a first grade kanji.

== Literature ==
- Fazzioli, Edoardo (1987). Chinese calligraphy : from pictograph to ideogram : the history of 214 essential Chinese/Japanese characters. calligraphy by Rebecca Hon Ko. New York: Abbeville Press. ISBN 0-89659-774-1.
- Li, Leyi (1993). Tracing the Roots of Chinese Characters: 500 Cases. Beijing. ISBN 978-7-5619-0204-2.

== See also ==
- Chinese numerals
