= Radical 158 =

Chinese character radical

身
- Radical 158 (U+2F9D)
- 身 (U+8EAB) "body"

Pronunciations
- Pinyin: shēn
- Bopomofo: ㄕㄣ
- Wade–Giles: shen1
- Cantonese Yale: san1
- Jyutping: san1, gyun1
- Japanese Kana: シン shin (on'yomi) み mi (kun'yomi)
- Sino-Korean: 신 sin
- Hán-Việt: thân

Names
- Chinese name(s): 身字旁 shēnzìpáng
- Japanese name(s): 身/み mi 身偏/みへん mihen
- Hangul: 몸 mom

Stroke order animation

Radical 158 or radical body (身部) meaning "body" is one of the 20 Kangxi radicals (214 radicals in total) composed of 7 strokes.

In the Kangxi Dictionary, there are 97 characters (out of 49,030) to be found under this radical.

身 is also the 160th indexing component in the Table of Indexing Chinese Character Components predominantly adopted by Simplified Chinese dictionaries published in mainland China.

== Evolution ==
Oracle bone script character

Bronze script character

Chu slip and silk script

Large seal script character

Small seal script character

== Derived characters ==
Strokes	Characters
+0	身
+3	躬
+4	躭 (=耽 -> 耳) 躮 躯^{SC/JP} (=軀)
+5	躰 (=體 -> 骨)
+6	躱 (=躲) 躲
+7	躳 (=躬) 躴 躵
+8	躶 (=裸 -> 衣) 躷 (=矮 -> 矢) 躸 躹 躺 躻 躼
+9	躽 躾
+10	躿
+11	軀 軁
+12	軂 軃 (=躲 / 嚲 -> 口) 軄 (=職 -> 耳) 軅^{JP} (=軈)
+13	軆 (=體 -> 骨)
+14	軇
+17	軈^{JP}
+20	軉

== Sinogram ==
The radical is also used as an independent Chinese character. It is one of the Kyōiku kanji or Kanji taught in elementary school in Japan. It is a third grade kanji.

== Literature ==
- Fazzioli, Edoardo (1987). Chinese calligraphy : from pictograph to ideogram : the history of 214 essential Chinese/Japanese characters. calligraphy by Rebecca Hon Ko. New York: Abbeville Press. ISBN 0-89659-774-1.
