= Radical 36 =

Chinese character radical

夕
- Radical 36 (U+2F23)
- 夕 (U+5915) "evening, sunset"

Pronunciations
- Pinyin: xī, xì
- Bopomofo: ㄒㄧ, ㄒㄧˋ
- Gwoyeu Romatzyh: shi, shih
- Wade–Giles: hsi^{1}, hsi^{4}
- Cantonese Yale: jihk
- Jyutping: zik6
- Pe̍h-ōe-jī: se̍k
- Japanese Kana: セキ seki (on'yomi) ゆう yū / ゆうべ yūbe (kun'yomi)
- Sino-Korean: 석 seok

Names
- Japanese name(s): 夕/ゆうべ/ゆう yūbe/yū タ/た ta
- Hangul: 저녁 jeonyeok

Stroke order animation

Radical 36 or radical evening (夕部) meaning "evening" or "sunset" is one of the 31 Kangxi radicals (214 radicals total) composed of three strokes.

In the Kangxi Dictionary, there are 34 characters (out of 49,030) to be found under this radical.

夕 is also the 43rd indexing component in the Table of Indexing Chinese Character Components predominantly adopted by Simplified Chinese dictionaries published in mainland China.

== Evolution ==
=== 夕 ===
Compare 月; unrelated to 歹 and 舛.

Oracle bone script character

Bronze script character

Chu slip and silk script

Large seal script character

Small seal script character

=== 夙 (early morning) ===
Oracle bone script character

Bronze script character

Large seal script character

Small seal script character

=== 多 (many) ===
Two pieces of meat (肉).

Oracle bone script character

Bronze script character

Large seal script character

Small seal script character

=== 夜 (night) ===
Phono-semantic compound: phonetic 亦 (OC *laːɡ) + semantic 夕

Bronze script character

Large seal script character

Small seal script character

Han dynasty Clerical script

=== 夢/梦 (dream) ===
Shang dynasty Oracle bone script

Western Zhou Bronze script

Chu slip and silk script

Qin slip script

Large seal script character

Small seal script character

== Derived characters ==
Strokes	Characters
+0	夕
+2	外 夗 夘
+3	夙 多 夛 (=多) 名
+5	夜 夝 (=晴 -> 日)
+7	夞^{KO} 够^{SC/variant} (=夠) 夠
+8	梦^{SC/variant} (=夢)
+9	夡
+11	夢 夣 夤 夥

== Sinogram ==
The radical is also used as an independent Chinese character. It is one of the Kyōiku kanji or Kanji taught in elementary school in Japan. It is a first grade kanji.

== Literature ==
- Fazzioli, Edoardo (1987). Chinese calligraphy : from pictograph to ideogram : the history of 214 essential Chinese/Japanese characters. calligraphy by Rebecca Hon Ko. New York: Abbeville Press. ISBN 0-89659-774-1.
- Lunde, Ken (Jan 5, 2009). "Appendix J: Japanese Character Sets" (PDF). CJKV Information Processing: Chinese, Japanese, Korean & Vietnamese Computing (Second ed.). Sebastopol, Calif.: O'Reilly Media. ISBN 978-0-596-51447-1.
