= Radical 19 =

Chinese character radical

力
- Radical 19 (U+2F12)
- 力 (U+529B) "power"

Pronunciations
- Pinyin: lì
- Bopomofo: ㄌㄧˋ
- Wade–Giles: li4
- Cantonese Yale: lik6
- Jyutping: lik6
- Pe̍h-ōe-jī: la̍t (col.) le̍k (lit.)
- Japanese Kana: リョク ryoku / リキ riki (on'yomi) ちから chikara (kun'yomi)
- Sino-Korean: 력 (역) ryeok
- Hán-Việt: lực

Names
- Chinese name(s): 力字旁 lìzìpáng
- Japanese name(s): 力 chikara
- Hangul: 힘 him

Stroke order animation

Radical 19 or radical power (力部) meaning "power" or "force" is one of the 23 Kangxi radicals (214 radicals total) composed of 2 strokes.

In the Kangxi Dictionary, there are 163 characters (out of 49,030) to be found under this radical.

力 is also the 23rd indexing component in the Table of Indexing Chinese Character Components predominantly adopted by Simplified Chinese dictionaries published in mainland China.

== Evolution ==
Kana ka (か/カ) are from 加. Compare 九, 又 and 爪; unrelated to 刀.

Shang dynasty oracle bone script

Western Zhou bronze script

Spring and Autumn period bronze script

Warring States period bronze script

Chu slip and silk script

Qin slip script

Large seal script character

Small seal script character

== Derived characters ==
Strokes	Characters
+0	力
+1	劜
+2	劝^{SC} (=勸) 办^{SC} (=辦 -> 辛)
+3	功 加 务^{SC} (=務) 劢^{SC} (=勱)
+4	劣 劤 劥 劦 劧 动^{SC} (=動) 攰
+5	助 努 劫 劬 劭 劮 劯 劰 励^{SC/JP} (=勵) 劲^{SC} (=勁) 劳^{SC} (=勞) 労^{JP} (=勞)
+6	劵 劶 劷 劸 効^{JP/variant} (=效 -> 攴) 劺 劻 劼 劽 劾 势^{SC} (=勢)
+7	勀 勁 勂 勃 勄 勅^{JP/variant} (=敕 -> 攴) 勆 勇 勈 勉 勊 勋^{SC} (=勛/勳) 巭^{KO}
+8	勌 勍 勎 勏 勐 勑
+9	勒 勓 勔 動 勖 勗 勘 務 勚^{SC} (=勩)
+10	勛 勜 勝 勞
+11	募 勠 勡 勢 勣 勤 勥 勦 勧^{JP} (=勸)
+12	勨 勩 勪 勫 勬 勭
+13	勮 勯 勰 勱 勲^{JP} (=勳)
+14	勳
+15	勴 勵 勶
+17	勷
+18	勸

== Sinogram ==
The radical is also used as an independent Chinese character. It is one of the kyōiku kanji or kanji taught in elementary school in Japan. It is a first grade kanji.

== Literature ==
- Fazzioli, Edoardo (1987). Chinese calligraphy : from pictograph to ideogram : the history of 214 essential Chinese/Japanese characters. calligraphy by Rebecca Hon Ko. New York: Abbeville Press. ISBN 0-89659-774-1.
- Leyi Li: “Tracing the Roots of Chinese Characters: 500 Cases”. Beijing 1993, ISBN 978-7-5619-0204-2
