= Radical 58 =

Kangxi radical

彐
- Radical 58 (U+2F39)
- 彐 (U+5F50) "pig snout"

Pronunciations
- Pinyin: jì
- Bopomofo: ㄐㄧˋ
- Wade–Giles: chi4
- Cantonese Yale: gai
- Jyutping: gai3
- Pe̍h-ōe-jī: kī
- Japanese Kana: ケイ kei (on'yomi) けいがしら keigashira (kun'yomi)
- Sino-Korean: 계 gye

Names
- Chinese name(s): 雪字底 xuězìdǐ 尋字頭/寻字头 xúnzìtóu
- Japanese name(s): 彑頭/けいがしら keigashira 豕頭/いのこがしら inokogashira
- Hangul: 돼지머리 dwaeji meori

Stroke order animation

Radical 58 or radical snout (彐部) meaning "pig snout" is one of the 31 Kangxi radicals (214 radicals in total) composed of three strokes.

In the Kangxi Dictionary, there are 25 characters (out of 49,030) to be found under this radical.

彐 is also the 50 indexing component in the Table of Indexing Chinese Character Components predominantly adopted by Simplified Chinese dictionaries published in mainland China. Two associated indexing components, ⺕ and 彑, are affiliated to the principal indexing component 彐.

== Evolution ==
=== 彑/彐 ===
Unrelated to 彔-录, 庚 (7th Heavenly Stem). 彐 sometimes means hand (又) such as in 帚, 雪, and 聿.

Small seal script character

=== 彔 ===
Oracle bone script

Bronze script

Large seal script

Small seal script

=== 当 (simplied from 當) ===
Chu slip and silk script

Large seal script

Small seal script

== Derived characters ==
Strokes	Characters
+0	彐 彑
+2	归^{SC}(=歸 -> 止)
+3	当^{SC/JP}(=當 -> 田)
+5	彔 录^{SC} (= 錄 -> 金 / 彔)
+6	彖
+7	兼
+8	彗
+9	彘
+10	彙 彚 (=彙)
+13	彛 (=彝) 彜 (=彝)
+15	彝 彞 (=彝)
+19	彟^{SC} (=彠)
+23	彠

== Literature ==
- Fazzioli, Edoardo (1987). Chinese calligraphy : from pictograph to ideogram : the history of 214 essential Chinese/Japanese characters. calligraphy by Rebecca Hon Ko. New York: Abbeville Press. ISBN 0-89659-774-1.
- Lunde, Ken (Jan 5, 2009). "Appendix J: Japanese Character Sets" (PDF). CJKV Information Processing: Chinese, Japanese, Korean & Vietnamese Computing (Second ed.). Sebastopol, Calif.: O'Reilly Media. ISBN 978-0-596-51447-1.
