= Radical 93 =

Chinese character radical

牛
- Radical 93 (U+2F5C)
- 牛 (U+725B) "cow"

Pronunciations
- Pinyin: niú
- Bopomofo: ㄋㄧㄡˊ
- Gwoyeu Romatzyh: niou
- Wade–Giles: niu^{2}
- Cantonese Yale: ngàuh
- Jyutping: ngau4
- Pe̍h-ōe-jī: giû
- Japanese Kana: ギュウ gyū / ゴ go (on'yomi) うし ushi (kun'yomi)
- Sino-Korean: 우 u

Names
- Chinese name(s): (牜) 牛字旁 niúzìpáng (Bottom) 牛字底 niúzìdǐ
- Japanese name(s): 牛/うし ushi (牜) 牛偏/うしへん ushihen
- Hangul: 소 so

Stroke order animation

Stroke order of the left component form 牜

Radical 93 or radical cow (牛部) meaning "cow" or "bulls" is one of the 34 Kangxi radicals (214 radicals total) composed of 4 strokes.

When appearing at the left side of a Chinese character, it transforms into 牜, with the last two strokes switching their order and the last stroke becoming a rising stroke rather than a horizontal stroke.

In the Kangxi Dictionary, there are 233 characters (out of 49,030) to be found under this radical.

牛 is also the 79th indexing component in the Table of Indexing Chinese Character Components predominantly adopted by Simplified Chinese dictionaries published in mainland China, with 牜 being its associated indexing component.

== Evolution ==
Unrelated to 午.

Shang dynasty Oracle bone script

Shang dynasty Bronze script

Western Zhou Bronze script

Western Zhou Bronze script variant

Chu slip and silk script

Large seal script character

Small seal script character

== Derived characters ==
Strokes	Characters
+0	牛 牜^{Component}
+2	牝 牞 牟
+3	牠 牡 牢 牣 牤
+4	牥 牦^{SC} (=氂 -> 毛) 牧 牨 物 牪 牫 牬
+5	牭 牮 牯 牰 牱 牲 牳 牴 牵^{SC} (=牽)
+6	牶 牷 牸 特 牺^{SC} (=犧)
+7	牻 牼 牽 牾 牿 犁
+8	犀 犂 (=犁) 犃 犄 犅 犆 犇 犈 犉 犊^{SC} (=犢) 犋
+9	犌 犍 犎 犏 犐 犑
+10	犒 犓 犔 犕 犖 犗
+11	犘 犙 犚 犛 犟^{TC variant}
+12	犜 犝 犞 犟^{SC variant}
+13	犠^{JP} (=犧)
+15	犡 犢 犣 犤 犥 犦
+16	犧 犨
+18	犩
+20	犪
+23	犫

== Sinogram ==
As an independent sinogram, 牛 is a Chinese character with the meaning "bull". In Japan, it is one of the Kyōiku kanji which is taught in the second grade of elementary school.

== Literature ==
- Fazzioli, Edoardo (1987). Chinese calligraphy : from pictograph to ideogram : the history of 214 essential Chinese/Japanese characters. calligraphy by Rebecca Hon Ko. New York: Abbeville Press. ISBN 0-89659-774-1.
- Lunde, Ken (Jan 5, 2009). "Appendix J: Japanese Character Sets" (PDF). CJKV Information Processing: Chinese, Japanese, Korean & Vietnamese Computing (Second ed.). Sebastopol, Calif.: O'Reilly Media. ISBN 978-0-596-51447-1.
