= Radical 66 =

Chinese character radical

攴
- Radical 66 (U+2F41)
- 攴 (U+6534) "tap"

Pronunciations
- Pinyin: pū
- Bopomofo: ㄆㄨ
- Gwoyeu Romatzyh: pu
- Wade–Giles: pʻu^{1}
- Cantonese Yale: pok
- Jyutping: pok3
- Pe̍h-ōe-jī: phok
- Japanese Kana: ホク hoku (on'yomi) うつ utsu (kun'yomi)
- Sino-Korean: 복 bok

Names
- Chinese name(s): (攵) 反文旁 fǎnwénpáng (攴) 缺支 quēzhī
- Japanese name(s): 攴旁/ぼくづくり bokuzukuri 攴繞/ぼくにょう bokunyō ぼんにょう bonnyō ノ文/のぶん nobun 支文/しぶん shibun ト又/とまた tomata
- Hangul: 칠 chil

Stroke order animation

Radical 66 or radical tap (攴部) meaning "Tap (valve)" is one of the 34 Kangxi radicals (214 radicals in total) composed of 4 strokes. It is also used to represent a folding chair.

In the Kangxi Dictionary, there are 296 characters (out of 49,030) to be found under this radical.

攴 is also the 74th indexing component in the Table of Indexing Chinese Character Components predominantly adopted by Simplified Chinese dictionaries published in mainland China, with 攵 being its associated indexing component.

== Evolution ==
A hand (又) holding a tool (卜), similar to 支, 殳, 父, and 皮; unrelated to 夂 and 夊.

Oracle bone script character

Bronze script character

Large seal script character

Small seal script character

== Derived characters ==
Strokes	Characters
+0	攴 攵
+2	收 攷 (=考 -> 老)
+3	攸 改 攺 (=改) 攻 攼
+4	攽 放 敌^{SC} (=敵)
+5	政 敀 敁 敂 敃 敄 故
+6	敆 敇 效 敉 敊 敋 敏^{JP} 敖^{SC variant}
+7	敍^{HK} (=敘) 敎^{Kangxi/KO} (=教) 敏^{SC/TC/KO} 敐 救 敒 敓 敔 敕 敖^{TC variant} 敗 敘 教 敚^{SC} (=敓) 敛^{SC} (=斂) 敢^{SC variant}
+8	敜 敝 敞 敟 敠 敡 敢^{TC variant} 散 敤 敥 敦 敧 敨 敩^{SC} (=斆) 敪 敬^{SC/JP variant}
+9	敫 敬^{TC variant} 敭 敮 敯 数^{SC/JP} (=數)
+10	敱 敲 敳
+11	敵 敶 敷 數 敹 敺 敻
+12	整 敼 敽 敾 敿
+13	厳^{JP} (=嚴 -> 口) 斀 斁 斂
+14	斃
+15	斄
+16	斅 斆 (=斅)

== Literature ==
- Fazzioli, Edoardo (1987). Chinese calligraphy : from pictograph to ideogram : the history of 214 essential Chinese/Japanese characters. calligraphy by Rebecca Hon Ko. New York: Abbeville Press. ISBN 0-89659-774-1.
- Lunde, Ken (Jan 5, 2009). "Appendix J: Japanese Character Sets" (PDF). CJKV Information Processing: Chinese, Japanese, Korean & Vietnamese Computing (Second ed.). Sebastopol, Calif.: O'Reilly Media. ISBN 978-0-596-51447-1.
