= Radical 156 =

Chinese character radical

走
- Radical 156 (U+2F9B)
- 走 (U+8D70) "run"

Pronunciations
- Pinyin: zǒu
- Bopomofo: ㄗㄡˇ
- Wade–Giles: tsou3
- Cantonese Yale: jau2
- Jyutping: zau2
- Japanese Kana: ソウ sō (on'yomi) はし-る hashi-ru (kun'yomi)
- Sino-Korean: 주 ju
- Hán-Việt: tẩu, rảo

Names
- Chinese name(s): 走字底 zǒuzìdǐ
- Japanese name(s): 走/はしる hashiru
- Hangul: 달릴 dallil

Stroke order animation

Radical 156 or radical run (走部) meaning "run" is one of the 20 Kangxi radicals (214 radicals in total) composed of 7 strokes.

In the Kangxi Dictionary, there are 285 characters (out of 49,030) to be found under this radical.

走 is also the 150th indexing component in the Table of Indexing Chinese Character Components predominantly adopted by Simplified Chinese dictionaries published in mainland China.

== Evolution ==
Shang dynasty Oracle bone script

Western Zhou Bronze script

Spring and Autumn period bronze script

Warring States period bronze script

Chu slip and silk script

Qin slip script

Large seal script character

Small seal script character

== Derived characters ==
Strokes	Characters
+0	走 赱 (=走)
+2	赲 赳 赴 赵^{SC} (=趙)
+3	赶^{SC} (=趕) 起 赸
+4	赹 赺 赻 赼 (=趑) 赽 赾 赿 (=遲 -> 辵)
+5	趀 趁 趂 (=趁) 趃 趄 超 趆 趇 趈 (=站 -> 立) 趉 越 趋^{SC} (=趨)
+6	趌 趍 趎 趏 趐 趑 趒 趓 (=躲 -> 身) 趔
+7	趕 趖 趗 趘 趙 趚
+8	趛 趜 趝 趞 趟 趠 趡 趢 趣 趤
+9	趥 趦 趧
+10	趨
+12	趩 趪 趫 趬 趭
+13	趮
+14	趯 趰
+16	趱^{SC} (=趲)
+19	趲

== Sinogram ==
As an independent sinogram 走 is one of the Kyōiku kanji or Kanji taught in elementary school in Japan. It is a second grade kanji.
