= Radical 108 =

Chinese character radical

皿
- Radical 108 (U+2F6B)
- 皿 (U+76BF) "dish"

Pronunciations
- Pinyin: mǐn
- Bopomofo: ㄇㄧㄣˇ
- Wade–Giles: min3
- Cantonese Yale: ming5
- Jyutping: ming5
- Japanese Kana: ベイ bei / ミョウ myō (on'yomi) さら sara (kun'yomi)
- Sino-Korean: 명 myeong

Names
- Chinese name(s): 皿字底 mǐnzìdǐ
- Japanese name(s): 皿/さら sara
- Hangul: 그릇 geureut

Stroke order animation

Radical 108 or radical dish (皿部) meaning "dish" is one of the 23 Kangxi radicals (214 radicals in total) composed of 5 strokes.

In the Kangxi Dictionary, there are 129 characters (out of 49,030) to be found under this radical.

皿 is also the 108th indexing component in the Table of Indexing Chinese Character Components predominantly adopted by Simplified Chinese dictionaries published in mainland China.

== Evolution ==
Component of 血; compare 豆 and 壴.

Oracle bone script character

Bronze script character

Large seal script character

Small seal script character

== Derived characters ==
Strokes	Characters
+0	皿
+2	盀 盁
+3	盂
+4	盃 盄 盅 盆 盇 (=盍) 盈
+5	盉 益 盋 盌 盍 盎 盏^{SC} (=盞) 盐^{SC} (=鹽 -> 鹵) 监^{SC} (=監)
+6	盒 盓 盔 盕 盖 盗^{SC/JP} (=盜) 盘^{SC} (=盤) 盙 盚 盛
+7	盜
+8	盝 盞 盟
+9	盠 盡 盢 監
+10	盤
+11	盥 盦 盧
+12	盨 盩 盪
+13	盫 盬
+15	盭
+16	蘯

== Sinogram ==
The radical is also used as an independent Chinese character. It is one of the kyōiku kanji or kanji taught in elementary school in Japan. It is a third grade kanji.

== Literature ==
- Fazzioli, Edoardo (1987). Chinese calligraphy : from pictograph to ideogram : the history of 214 essential Chinese/Japanese characters. calligraphy by Rebecca Hon Ko. New York: Abbeville Press. ISBN 0-89659-774-1.
- Lunde, Ken (Jan 5, 2009). "Appendix J: Japanese Character Sets" (PDF). CJKV Information Processing: Chinese, Japanese, Korean & Vietnamese Computing (Second ed.). Sebastopol, Calif.: O'Reilly Media. ISBN 978-0-596-51447-1.
