= Radical 29 =

Chinese character radical

又
- Radical 29 (U+2F1C)
- 又 (U+53C8) "right hand"

Pronunciations
- Pinyin: yòu
- Bopomofo: ㄧㄡˋ
- Gwoyeu Romatzyh: yow
- Wade–Giles: yu^{4}
- Cantonese Yale: yauh
- Jyutping: jau6
- Pe̍h-ōe-jī: iū
- Japanese Kana: ユウ yū (on'yomi) また mata (kun'yomi)
- Sino-Korean: 우 u

Names
- Chinese name(s): 又字旁 yòuzìpáng
- Japanese name(s): 又/また mata
- Hangul: 또 tto

Stroke order animation

Radical 29 or radical again (又部) meaning "and", "again" or "right hand" is one of the 23 Kangxi radicals (214 radicals total) composed of two strokes.

In the Kangxi Dictionary, there are 91 characters (out of 49,030) to be found under this radical.

又 is also the 24th indexing component in the Table of Indexing Chinese Character Components predominantly adopted by Simplified Chinese dictionaries published in mainland China.

== Evolution ==
Oracle bone script character

Bronze script character

Chu slip and silk script

Large seal script character

Small seal script character

The radical character 又's ancient form is a pictogram of a right hand from which the modern Chinese character 右 (right) was derived. Though 又 (again) as a modern Chinese character no longer represents the meaning of "right", the implication of "hand" is preserved in some Chinese characters that fall under radical 29.

Compare 力, 九, 彐, 爪 and 手; unrelated to 夂, 夊 and 文. Component of 寸, 支, 攴-攵, 殳, 父, and 皮. Sometimes written as 彐 such as in 雪 and 尹.

== Derived characters ==
Strokes	Characters
+0	又
+1	叉
+2	及 友 双^{SC/JP} (=雙 -> 隹) 反 収^{JP} (=收 -> 攴)
+3	叏 叐
+4	发^{SC} (=發 -> 癶 / 髮 -> 髟) 叒
+5	叓
+6	叔 叕 取 受 变^{SC} (=變 -> 言)
+7	叙^{SC/JP/variant} (=敘/敍 -> 攴) 叚 叛 叜 叝
+8	叞 叟
+11	叠^{SC} (=疊 -> 田)
+14	叡
+16	叢

== Sinogram ==
As an independent sinogram it is a Jōyō kanji, or a kanji used in writing the Japanese language. It is a secondary school kanji.

== See also ==
- List of jōyō kanji

== Literature ==
- Fazzioli, Edoardo (1987). Chinese calligraphy : from pictograph to ideogram : the history of 214 essential Chinese/Japanese characters. calligraphy by Rebecca Hon Ko. New York: Abbeville Press. ISBN 0-89659-774-1.
- Lunde, Ken (Jan 5, 2009). "Appendix J: Japanese Character Sets" (PDF). CJKV Information Processing: Chinese, Japanese, Korean & Vietnamese Computing (Second ed.). Sebastopol, Calif.: O'Reilly Media. ISBN 978-0-596-51447-1.
