= 內 =

內 may refer to:

- the interior of China, see Mainland China
- "internal" martial arts, see Neijia
- "internal" alchemy, see Neidan
- a type of rime in Chinese poetry, see Rime table

== See also ==
- Radical 11
