= Radical 64 =

Chinese character radical

手
- Radical 64 (U+2F3F)
- 手 (U+624B) "hand"

Pronunciations
- Pinyin: shǒu
- Bopomofo: ㄕㄡˇ
- Gwoyeu Romatzyh: shoou
- Wade–Giles: shou^{3}
- Cantonese Yale: sáu
- Jyutping: sau2
- Pe̍h-ōe-jī: siú
- Japanese Kana: シュウ shū (on'yomi) て te (kun'yomi)
- Sino-Korean: 수 su

Names
- Chinese name(s): (扌) 提手旁 tíshǒupáng (Bottom) 手字底 shǒuzìdǐ
- Japanese name(s): 手/て te (扌) 手偏/てへん tehen
- Hangul: 손 son (扌) 재방변/才傍邊 jaebangbyeon

Stroke order animation

Stroke order of the left component form 扌

Radical 64 or radical hand (手部) meaning "hand" is one of the 34 Kangxi radicals (214 radicals in total) composed of 4 strokes.

When appearing as a left-side component, this radical is almost always written as 扌 (notable exceptions: 拜, although Japanese shinjitai analogizes it to 拝; and dialectal characters 掰, 搿), while it becomes a vertically compressed 手 when appearing as a bottom component.

In the Kangxi Dictionary, there are 1203 characters (out of 49,030) to be found under this radical.

手 is also the 80th indexing component in the Table of Indexing Chinese Character Components predominantly adopted by Simplified Chinese dictionaries published in mainland China, with 扌 being its associated indexing component.

== Evolution ==
Compare 又, 寸, 彐, 毛 and 爪; Unrelated to テ which is from 天.

Bronze script

Chu slip and silk script

Qin slip script

Shuowen ancient script

Large seal script

Small seal script

=== 才 ===
Compare 弋; unrelated to katakana オ which is from 於.

Oracle bone script

Bronze script

Large seal script

Small seal script

== Derived characters ==
Strokes	Characters
+0	手 扌^{Component only} 才
+1	扎
+2	扐 扑 (also SC form of 撲) 扒 打 扔 払^{JP} (=拂) 扖 扏
+3	扗 托 扙 扚 扛 扜 扝 扞 扟 扠 扡 扢 扣 扤 扥 扦 执^{SC} (=執 -> 土) 扨 扩^{SC} (=擴) 扪^{SC} (=捫) 扫^{SC} (=掃) 扬^{SC} (=揚)
+4	扭 扮 扯 扰^{SC} (=擾) 扱 扲 扳 扴 扵 (=於 -> 方) 扶 扷 扸 批 扺 扻 扼 扽 找 承 技 抁 抂 抃 抄 抅 抆 抇 抈 抉 把 抋 抌 抍 抎 抏 抐 抑 抒 抓 抔 投 抖 抗 折 抙 抚^{SC} (=撫) 抛^{SC} (=拋) 抜^{JP} (=拔) 抝 択^{JP} (=擇) 抟^{SC} (=摶) 抠^{SC} (=摳) 抡^{SC} (=掄) 抢^{SC} (=搶) 抣 护^{SC} (=護 -> 言) 报^{SC} (=報 -> 土) 拒^{SC variant}
+5	抦 抧 抨 抩 抪 披 抬 抭 抮 抯 抰 抱 抳 抴 抵 抶 抷 抸 抹 抺 抻 押 抽 抾 抿 拀 拁 拂 拃 拄 担^{SC/JP} (=擔) 拆 拇 拈 拉 拊 拋 拌 拍 拎 拏 拐^{SC}/拐^{TC} 拑 拒^{TC/JP variant} 拓 拔^{SC}/拔^{TC} 拕 拖 拗 拘 拙 拚 招 拜 拝^{JP} (=拜) 拞 拟^{SC} (=擬) 拠^{JP} (=據) 拡^{JP} (=擴) 拢^{SC} (=攏) 拣^{SC} (=揀) 拤 拥^{SC} (=擁) 拦^{SC} (=攔) 拧^{SC} (=擰) 拨^{SC} (=撥) 择^{SC} (=擇)
+6	拪 拫 括 拭 拮 拯 拰 拱 拲 拳 拴 拵 拶 拷 拸 拹 拺 拻 拼 拽 拾 拿 挀 持 挂 挃 挄 挅 挆 指 挈 按 挊 挋 挌 挍 挎 挏 挐 挑 挒 挓 挔 挕 挖 挗 挘 挙^{JP} (=舉) 挚^{SC} (=摯) 挛^{SC} (=攣) 挜^{SC} (=掗) 挝^{SC} (=撾) 挞^{SC} (=撻) 挟^{SC/JP} (=挾) 挠^{SC} (=撓) 挡^{SC} (=擋) 挢^{SC} (=撟) 挣^{SC} (=掙) 挤^{SC} (=擠) 挥^{SC} (=揮) 挦^{SC} (=撏) 挧
+7	挨 挩 挪 挫 挬 挭 挮 振 挰 挱 挲 挳 挴 挵 挶 挷 挸 挹 挺 挻 挼 挽 挾 挿^{JP} (=插) 捀 捁 捂 捃 捄 捅 捆 捇 捈 捉 捊 捋 捌 捍 捎 捏 捐 捑 捒 捓 捔 捕 捖 捘 捙 捚 捛 捜 捝^{SC} (=挩) 捞^{SC} (=撈) 损^{SC} (=損) 捠 捡^{SC} (=撿) 换^{SC} (=換) 捣^{SC} (=搗) 捤
+8	捗 捥 捦 捧 捨^{TC}/捨^{JP} 捩 捪 捫 捬 捭 据 捯 捰 捱 捳 捴 (=總 -> 糸) 捵 捶^{SC/JP variant} 捷 捸 捹 捺 捻 捼 捽 捾 捿 掀 掁 掂 掃 掄 掅 掆 掇 授 掉 掊 掋 掌 掍 掎 掏 掐 掑 排 掓 掔 掕 掖 掗 掘 掙 掚 掛 掜 掝 掞 掟 掠 採 探 掣 掤 接 掦 控 推 掩 措 掫 掬 掭 掮 掯 掰 掱 掲^{JP} (=揭) 掳^{SC} (=擄) 掴^{SC/JP} (=摑) 掵^{JP} 掶 (=捷) 掷^{SC} (=擲) 掸^{SC} (=撣) 掹 掺^{SC} (=摻) 掻^{JP} (=搔) 掼^{SC} (=摜) 掽 (=碰 -> 石) 掿^{SC variant} 描^{SC/JP variant}
+9	捶^{TC variant} 捲 掾 掿^{TC variant} 揀 揁 揂 揃 揄 揅 揆 揇 揈 揉 揊 揋 揌 揍 揎 描^{TC variant} 提 揑 (=捏) 插 揓 揔 揕 揖 揗 揘 揙 揚 換 揜 揝 揞 揟 揠 握 揢 揣 揤 揥 揦 揧 揨 揩 揪 揫 揬 揭 揮 揯 揰 揱 揲 揳 援 揵 揶 揷 (=插) 揸 揹 揺^{JP} (=搖) 揻 揼 揽^{SC} (=攬) 揾^{SC/HK} (=搵) 揿^{SC} (=撳) 搀^{SC} (=攙) 搁^{SC} (=擱) 搂^{SC} (=摟) 搃 搄^{SC} (=揯) 搅^{SC} (=攪) 搑^{SC variant} 搓^{SC variant} 搔^{SC variant} 搥^{SC variant} 搭^{SC variant} 搰^{SC variant} 搽^{SC variant}
+10	搆 搇 搈 搉 搊 搋 搌 損 搎 搏 搐 搑^{TC variant} 搒 搓^{TC variant} 搔^{TC variant} 搕 搖 搗 搘 搙 搚 搛 搜 搝 搞 搟 搠 搡 搢^{SC}/搢^{TC} 搣 搤 搥^{TC variant} 搦 搧 搨 搩 搪 搫 搬 搭^{TC variant} 搮 搯 搰^{TC variant} 搱 搲 搳 搴 搵 搶 搷 搸 搹 携^{SC/JP} (=攜) 搻 搼 搽^{TC variant} 搾^{JP/variant} (=榨 -> 木) 搿 摀 摁 摂^{JP} (=攝) 摃 摄^{SC} (=攝) 摅^{SC} (=攄) 摆^{SC} (=擺) 摇^{SC} (=搖) 摈^{SC} (=擯) 摉 摊^{SC} (=攤) 摸^{SC/JP variant} 摋^{GB TC variant} 摓^{SC variant} 摙^{GB TC variant} 撶^{GB TC variant}
+11	摸^{TC variant} 抲 摋^{Traditional variant} 摌 摍 摎 摏 摐 摑 摒 摓^{TC variant} 摔 摕 摖 摗 摘 摙^{Traditional variant} 摚 摛 摜 摝 摞 摟 摠 摡 摢 摣 摤 摥 摦 摧 摨 摩 摪 摫 摬 摭 摮 摯 摰 摱 摲 摳 摴 摵 摶 摷 摹 摺 摻 摼 摽 摾^{TC variant} 摿 撀 撁 撂 撃^{JP} (=擊) 撄^{SC} (=攖) 撾^{GB TC variant} 擆^{SC variant} 撖^{SC variant} 撗^{SC variant} 撯^{SC variant}
+12	摾^{SC variant} 撅 撆 撇 撈 撉 撊 撋 撌 撍 撎 撏 撐 撑^{SC/variant} (=撐) 撒 撓 撔 撕 撖^{TC variant} 撗^{TC variant} 撘 撙 撚 撛 撜 撝 撞 撟 撠 撡 (=操) 撢 撣 撤 撥 撦 撧 撨 撩 撪 撫 撬 播 撮 撯^{TC variant} 撰 撱 撲 撳 撴 撵 撶^{Traditional variant} 撷^{SC} (=擷) 撸^{SC} (=擼) 撹^{JP} (=攪) 撺^{SC} (=攛) 撻^{GB TC variant} 擎^{SC/JP variant} 擏^{SC variant} 擆^{TC variant} 擖^{SC variant} 擙^{SC variant} 擛^{SC variant}
+13	撻^{Traditional variant} 撼 撽 撾^{Traditional variant} 撿 擀 擁 擂 擃 擄 擅 擇 擈 擉 擊 擋 擌 操 擎^{TC variant} 擏^{TC variant} 擐 擑 擒 擓 擔 擕 (=攜) 擖^{TC variant} 擗 擘 擙^{TC variant} 據 擛^{TC variant} 擜^{SC} (=㩵) 擝 (=掹) 擞^{SC} (=擻)
+14	擟 擠 擡 擢 擣 擤 擥 擦 擧 (=舉) 擨 擩 擪 擫 擬 擭 擮 擯 擰 擱 擴^{GB TC variant} 攁^{SC variant} 擿^{SC variant} 攃^{SC variant}
+15	擲 擳 擴^{Traditional variant} 擵 擶 擷 擸 擹 擺 擻 擼 擽 擾 擿^{TC variant} 攀 攁^{TC variant} 攂 攃^{TC variant} 攄 攅^{JP nonstandard} (=攢) 攆
+16	攇 攈 攉 攊 攋 攌 攍 攎 攏 攐 攒^{SC} (=攢)
+17	攑 攓 攔 攕 攖 攗 攘 攙 攚
+18	攛 攜 攝
+19	攞 攟 攠 攡 (=摛) 攢 攣 攤 攦 攧
+20	攥 攨 攩 攪 攫
+21	攬 攭
+22	攮

== Sinogram ==
The radical is also used as an independent Chinese character. It is one of the Kyōiku kanji or Kanji taught in elementary school in Japan. It is a first grade kanji.

== Literature ==
- Fazzioli, Edoardo (1987). Chinese calligraphy : from pictograph to ideogram : the history of 214 essential Chinese/Japanese characters. calligraphy by Rebecca Hon Ko. New York: Abbeville Press. ISBN 0-89659-774-1.
- Lunde, Ken (Jan 5, 2009). "Appendix J: Japanese Character Sets" (PDF). CJKV Information Processing: Chinese, Japanese, Korean & Vietnamese Computing (Second ed.). Sebastopol, Calif.: O'Reilly Media. ISBN 978-0-596-51447-1.
