= Radical 78 =

Chinese character radical

歹
- Radical 78 (U+2F4D)
- 歹 (U+6B79) "death, decay"

Pronunciations
- Pinyin: dǎi
- Bopomofo: ㄉㄞˇ
- Wade–Giles: tai3
- Cantonese Yale: dáai
- Jyutping: aat3 daai2
- Pe̍h-ōe-jī: tái
- Japanese Kana: ガツ gatsu (on'yomi)
- Sino-Korean: 알 al

Names
- Chinese name(s): 歹字旁 dǎizìpáng
- Japanese name(s): かばねへん kabanehen 歹/がつ gatsu 歹偏/がつへん gatsuhen 死構/しにがまえ shinigamae 一タ偏/いちたへん ichitahen 一夕偏/いっせきへん ichisekihen
- Hangul: 뼈앙상할 ppyeo angsanghal

Stroke order animation

Radical 78 or radical death (歹部) meaning "death", "decay", "bad" or "vicious" is one of the 34 Kangxi radicals (214 radicals in total) composed of 4 strokes.

In the Kangxi Dictionary, there are 231 characters (out of 49,030) to be found under this radical.

歹 is also the 67th indexing component in the Table of Indexing Chinese Character Components predominantly adopted by Simplified Chinese dictionaries published in mainland China, with 歺 being its associated indexing component.

== Evolution ==
Unrelated to 夕.

Oracle bone script character

Large seal script character

Small seal script character

=== 死 ===
Phono-semantic compound: semantic 歹 + phonetic 尸 ("corpse"; OC *hli).

Oracle bone script

Bronze script

Chu slip and silk script

Large seal script

Small seal script

== Derived characters ==
Strokes	Characters
+0	歹 歺
+2	死
+3	歼^{SC} (=殲)
+4	歽 歾 歿 殀 殁^{SC} (=歿)
+5	殂 殃 殄 殅 殆 殇^{SC} (=殤)
+6	殈 殉 殊 残^{SC}/残^{JP} (=殘)
+7	殌 殍 殎 殏 殐 殑 殒^{SC} (=殞) 殓^{SC} (=殮)
+8	殔 殕 殖^{SC/TC}/殖^{Kangxi/JP/KO} 殗 殘 殙 殚^{SC} (=殫)
+9	殛 殜
+10	殝 殞 殟 殠 殡^{SC} (=殯)
+11	殢 殣 殤 殥 殦
+12	殧 殨 殩 殪 殫
+13	殬 殭 殮
+14	殯
+15	殰 殱 (=殲)
+17	殲

== Literature ==
- Fazzioli, Edoardo (1987). Chinese calligraphy : from pictograph to ideogram : the history of 214 essential Chinese/Japanese characters. calligraphy by Rebecca Hon Ko. New York: Abbeville Press. ISBN 0-89659-774-1.
- Lunde, Ken (Jan 5, 2009). "Appendix J: Japanese Character Sets" (PDF). CJKV Information Processing: Chinese, Japanese, Korean & Vietnamese Computing (Second ed.). Sebastopol, Calif.: O'Reilly Media. ISBN 978-0-596-51447-1.
