= Radical 125 =

Chinese character radical

老
- Radical 125 (U+2F7C)
- 老 (U+8001) "old"

Pronunciations
- Pinyin: lǎo
- Bopomofo: ㄌㄠˇ
- Gwoyeu Romatzyh: lao
- Wade–Giles: lao^{3}
- Cantonese Yale: lóuh
- Jyutping: lou5
- Japanese Kana: ロウ rou (on'yomi) おいる oiru ふける fukeru (kun'yomi)
- Sino-Korean: 로 ro

Names
- Chinese name(s): 老字頭/老字头 lǎozìtóu
- Japanese name(s): 老/おい oi
- Hangul: 늙을 neulgeul

Stroke order animation

Radical 125 or radical old (老部), which means "old" is one of the 29 Kangxi radicals (214 radicals in total) composed of 6 strokes. In the Kangxi Dictionary, there are 22 characters (out of 49,030) to be found under this radical. 老 is also the 123rd indexing component in the Table of Indexing Chinese Character Components predominantly adopted by Simplified Chinese dictionaries published in mainland China, with 耂 being its associated indexing component.

== Evolution ==
An old person with a walking stick.

Shang dynasty Oracle bone script

Western Zhou Bronze script

Spring and Autumn period bronze script

Warring States period bronze script

Chu slip and silk script

Qin slip script

Large seal script character

Small seal script character

Qing dynasty Clerical script

== Derived characters ==
Strokes	Characters
−2	耂
+0	老 考
+4	耄 者 耆
+5	耇 耈 (=耇) 耉 (=耇)
+6	耊 (=耋) 耋

== Hanzi ==
The radical is also used as an independent Hanzi and is a 4th grade of the Kyōiku kanji.

== Literature ==
- Fazzioli, Edoardo (1987). Chinese calligraphy : from pictograph to ideogram : the history of 214 essential Chinese/Japanese characters. calligraphy by Rebecca Hon Ko. New York: Abbeville Press. ISBN 0-89659-774-1.
- Lunde, Ken (Jan 5, 2009). "Appendix J: Japanese Character Sets" (PDF). CJKV Information Processing: Chinese, Japanese, Korean & Vietnamese Computing (Second ed.). Sebastopol, Calif.: O'Reilly Media. ISBN 978-0-596-51447-1.
