= Radical 89 =

Chinese character radical

爻
- Radical 89 (U+2F58)
- 爻 (U+723B) "Trigrams"

Pronunciations
- Pinyin: yáo
- Bopomofo: ㄧㄠˊ
- Gwoyeu Romatzyh: yau
- Wade–Giles: yao^{2}
- Cantonese Yale: ngàauh
- Jyutping: ngaau4
- Pe̍h-ōe-jī: ngâu
- Japanese Kana: コウ kō (on'yomi) まじわる majiwaru (kun'yomi)
- Sino-Korean: 효 hyo

Names
- Japanese name(s): 爻/こう kō まじわる majiwaru
- Hangul: 점괘 jeomgwe

Stroke order animation

Radical 89 or radical double x (爻部) meaning "trigrams" is one of the 34 Kangxi radicals (214 radicals in total) composed of 4 strokes.

In the Kangxi Dictionary, there are 16 characters (out of 49,030) to be found under this radical.

This radical does not exist in the Table of Indexing Chinese Character Components predominantly adopted by Simplified Chinese dictionaries published in mainland China.

== Evolution ==
=== 爻 ===
Unrelated to 父; compare 网.

Oracle bone script

Bronze script

Large seal script

Small seal script

=== 爽 ===
Compound 大 + 2x 火; means "bright"

Oracle bone script

Bronze script

Large seal script

Small seal script

=== 爾 ===
Simplified chinese and shinjitai: 尔. Originally meant "loom", phonetically borrowed to represent "you".

Oracle bone script

Bronze script

Chu slip and silk script

Small seal script

== Derived characters ==
Strokes	Characters
+0	爻
+5	爼
+7	爽
+10	爾

== Literature ==
- Fazzioli, Edoardo (1987). Chinese calligraphy : from pictograph to ideogram : the history of 214 essential Chinese/Japanese characters. calligraphy by Rebecca Hon Ko. New York: Abbeville Press. ISBN 0-89659-774-1.
- Lunde, Ken (Jan 5, 2009). "Appendix J: Japanese Character Sets" (PDF). CJKV Information Processing: Chinese, Japanese, Korean & Vietnamese Computing (Second ed.). Sebastopol, Calif.: O'Reilly Media. ISBN 978-0-596-51447-1.
