= Radical 62 =

Chinese character radical

戈
- Radical 62 (U+2F3D)
- 戈 (U+6208) "halberd, spear"

Pronunciations
- Pinyin: gē
- Bopomofo: ㄍㄜ
- Gwoyeu Romatzyh: ge
- Wade–Giles: ko^{1}
- Cantonese Yale: gwō
- Jyutping: gwo1
- Pe̍h-ōe-jī: ko
- Japanese Kana: カ ka (on'yomi) ほこ hoko (kun'yomi)
- Sino-Korean: 과 gwa

Names
- Chinese name(s): 戈字旁 gēzìpáng
- Japanese name(s): 戈構/ほこがまえ hokogamae (Right) 戈旁/ほこづくり hokodzukuri たすき tasuki 戈のほこ/かのほこ kanohoko
- Hangul: 창 chang

Stroke order animation

Radical 62 or radical halberd (戈部) meaning "halberd" or "spear" is one of the 34 Kangxi radicals (214 radicals in total) composed of 4 strokes.

In the Kangxi Dictionary, there are 116 characters (out of 49,030) to be found under this radical.

戈 is also the 70th indexing component in the Table of Indexing Chinese Character Components predominantly adopted by Simplified Chinese dictionaries published in mainland China.

== Evolution ==
=== 戈 ===
Oracle bone script

Bronze script

Chu slip and silk script

Small seal script

=== 戉 ===
Original form of 鉞

Oracle bone script

Shang dynasty Bronze script

Western Zhou bronze script

Large seal script

Small seal script

=== 戊 (5th Heavenly Stem) ===
Oracle bone script

Bronze script

Large seal script

Small seal script

=== 戌 (11th Earthly Branch) ===
Oracle bone script

Bronze script

Large seal script

Small seal script

=== 戍 (defend) ===
人 ("man") + 戈

Oracle bone script

Bronze script

Large seal script

Small seal script

=== 我 (I; me) ===
Oracle bone script

Western Zhou bronze script

Chu slip and silk script

Large seal script

Small seal script

=== 或 (or; perhaps) ===
Oracle bone script

Shang dynasty Bronze script

Western Zhou bronze script

Spring and Autumn period bronze script

Chu slip and silk script

Qin slip script

Large seal script

Small seal script

== Derived characters ==
Strokes	Characters
+0	戈
+1	戉 戊 戋^{SC} (=戔)
+2	戌 戍 戎 戏^{SC} (=戲) 成
+3	我 戒 戓
+4	戔 戕 或 戗^{SC} (=戧)
+5	战^{SC} (=戰)
+6	戙
+7	戚 戛 戜 戝 (=賊)
+8	戞 戟 裁
+9	戠 戡 戢 戣 戤 戥 戦^{JP} (=戰)
+10	戧 戨 戩 截 戫 戬^{SC/variant} (=戩)
+11	戭 戮 戯^{JP} (=戲) 戱 (=戲) 戴
+12	戰
+13	戲
+14	戳 戴
+18	戵

== Literature ==
- Fazzioli, Edoardo (1987). Chinese calligraphy : from pictograph to ideogram : the history of 214 essential Chinese/Japanese characters. calligraphy by Rebecca Hon Ko. New York: Abbeville Press. ISBN 0-89659-774-1.
- Lunde, Ken (Jan 5, 2009). "Appendix J: Japanese Character Sets" (PDF). CJKV Information Processing: Chinese, Japanese, Korean & Vietnamese Computing (Second ed.). Sebastopol, Calif.: O'Reilly Media. ISBN 978-0-596-51447-1.
