= Radical 105 =

Chinese character radical

癶
- Radical 105 (U+2F68)
- 癶 (U+7676) "footsteps, legs"

Pronunciations
- Pinyin: bō
- Bopomofo: ㄅㄛ
- Wade–Giles: po1
- Cantonese Yale: but6
- Jyutping: but6
- Japanese Kana: ハツ hatsu (on'yomi)
- Sino-Korean: 발 bal

Names
- Chinese name(s): 登字頭/登字头 dēngzìtóu
- Japanese name(s): 発頭/はつがしら hatsugashira
- Hangul: 걸을 georeul

Stroke order animation

Radical 105 or radical dotted tent (癶部) meaning "footsteps" or is one of the 23 Kangxi radicals (214 radicals in total) composed of 5 strokes.

In the Kangxi Dictionary, there are 15 characters (out of 49,030) to be found under this radical.

癶 is also the 120th indexing component in the Table of Indexing Chinese Character Components predominantly adopted by Simplified Chinese dictionaries published in mainland China.

== Evolution ==
Right and left foot (止); compare 舛; unrelated to 癸 ("10th heavenly stem").

Small seal script character

=== 癸 ===
A four-handled plough.

Shang dynasty Oracle bone script

Shang dynasty Bronze script

Western Zhou Bronze script

Spring and Autumn period bronze script

Warring States period bronze script

Chu slip and silk script

Qin slip script

Small seal script character

== Derived characters ==
Strokes	Characters
+0	癶
+3	癷
+4	癸 癹 発^{JP} (=發)
+7	登 發

== Literature ==
- Fazzioli, Edoardo (1987). Chinese calligraphy : from pictograph to ideogram : the history of 214 essential Chinese/Japanese characters. calligraphy by Rebecca Hon Ko. New York: Abbeville Press. ISBN 0-89659-774-1.
- Lunde, Ken (Jan 5, 2009). "Appendix J: Japanese Character Sets" (PDF). CJKV Information Processing: Chinese, Japanese, Korean & Vietnamese Computing (Second ed.). Sebastopol, Calif.: O'Reilly Media. ISBN 978-0-596-51447-1.
