= Radical 129 =

Chinese character radical

聿
- Radical 129 (U+2F80)
- 聿 (U+807F) "brush"

Pronunciations
- Pinyin: yù
- Bopomofo: ㄩˋ
- Gwoyeu Romatzyh: yuh
- Wade–Giles: yü^{4}
- Cantonese Yale: waht
- Jyutping: wat6
- Japanese Kana: イツ itsu / イチ ichi (on'yomi)
- Sino-Korean: 율 yul

Names
- Japanese name(s): 筆旁/ふでづくり fudezukuri
- Hangul: 붓 but

Stroke order animation

Radical 129 or radical brush (聿部) meaning "brush" is one of the 29 Kangxi radicals (214 radicals in total) composed of 6 strokes.

In the Kangxi Dictionary, there are 19 characters (out of 49,030) to be found under this radical.

聿 is also the 145th indexing component in the Table of Indexing Chinese Character Components predominantly adopted by Simplified Chinese dictionaries published in mainland China, with 肀 and ⺻ being its associated indexing components.

== Evolution ==
A hand (又) holding a brush (𰀁).

Oracle bone script character

Bronze script character

Large seal script character

Small seal script character

== Derived characters ==
Strokes	Characters
+0	聿 肀
+4	肁 肂 肃^{SC} (=肅)
+5	粛^{JP} (=肅)
+7	肄 肅 肆
+8	肇 肈 (=肇)

== Literature ==
- Fazzioli, Edoardo (1987). Chinese calligraphy : from pictograph to ideogram : the history of 214 essential Chinese/Japanese characters. calligraphy by Rebecca Hon Ko. New York: Abbeville Press. ISBN 0-89659-774-1.
- Lunde, Ken (Jan 5, 2009). "Appendix J: Japanese Character Sets" (PDF). CJKV Information Processing: Chinese, Japanese, Korean & Vietnamese Computing (Second ed.). Sebastopol, Calif.: O'Reilly Media. ISBN 978-0-596-51447-1.
