= Radical 214 =

Chinese character radical

龠
- Radical 214 (U+2FD5)
- 龠 (U+9FA0) "flute"

Pronunciations
- Pinyin: yuè
- Bopomofo: ㄩㄝˋ
- Wade–Giles: yüeh4
- Cantonese Yale: yeuk6
- Jyutping: joek6
- Japanese Kana: ヤク yaku ふえ fue
- Sino-Korean: 약 yak

Names
- Japanese name(s): 龠 yaku
- Hangul: 피리 piri

Stroke order animation

Radical 214 meaning "flute" (龠部) is the only one of the 214 Kangxi radicals that is composed of 17 strokes, making it the radical that requires the most strokes.

In the Kangxi Dictionary there are 21 characters (out of 40,000) to be found under this radical.

龠 is also the 201st indexing component in the Table of Indexing Chinese Character Components predominantly adopted by Simplified Chinese dictionaries published in mainland China.

== Evolution ==
Pan flute and mouths (口 and 亼).

Shang dynasty oracle bone script

Western Zhou bronze script

Large seal script

Small seal script

== Characters with Radical 214 ==
strokes	character
+0	龠
+4	䶳 龡 𪛊
+5	龢
+8	䶴 龣 𪛋 𪛌 𪛍
+9	龤 龥 𪛎 𪛏 𪛐 𪛑
+10	䶵 𪛒
+11	𪛓
+12	𫜴
+14	𪛔
+16	𪛕
+20	𪛖

== Literature ==
- Fazzioli, Edoardo (1987). Chinese calligraphy : from pictograph to ideogram : the history of 214 essential Chinese/Japanese characters. calligraphy by Rebecca Hon Ko. New York: Abbeville Press. ISBN 0-89659-774-1.
- Leyi Li: "Tracing the Roots of Chinese Characters: 500 Cases". Beijing 1993, ISBN 978-7-5619-0204-2
