= Radical 82 =

Chinese character radical

毛
- Radical 82 (U+2F51)
- 毛 (U+6BDB) "fur, hair"

Pronunciations
- Pinyin: máo
- Bopomofo: ㄇㄠˊ
- Wade–Giles: mao2
- Cantonese Yale: mòuh
- Jyutping: mou4
- Pe̍h-ōe-jī: mô͘
- Japanese Kana: モウ mō ボウ bō (on'yomi) け ke (kun'yomi)
- Sino-Korean: 모 mo

Names
- Chinese name(s): 毛字底 máozìdǐ
- Japanese name(s): 毛/け ke
- Hangul: 털 teol

Stroke order animation

Radical 82 or radical fur (毛部) meaning "fur" is one of the 34 Kangxi radicals (214 radicals in total) composed of 4 strokes.

In the Kangxi Dictionary, there are 211 characters (out of 49,030) to be found under this radical.

毛 is also the 82nd indexing component in the Table of Indexing Chinese Character Components predominantly adopted by Simplified Chinese dictionaries published in mainland China.

The character is a Chinese family name, and often refers to the Chinese leader Mao Zedong.

== Evolution ==
Compare 手 ("hand").

Bronze script character

Chu slip and silk script

Large seal script character

Small seal script character

== Derived characters ==
Strokes	Characters
+0	毛
+3	毜 毝
+4	毞 毟
+5	毠 毡
+6	毢 毣 毤 毥 毦 毧 毨 毩 毪
+7	毫 毬 毭 毮
+8	毯 毰 毱 毲 毳 毴 毵^{SC} (=毿) 毶^{SC} (=𣯶)
+9	毷 毸 毹 毺 毻 毼 毽
+10	毾
+11	毿 氀 氁 氂
+12	氃 氄 氅 氆 氇^{SC} (=氌)
+13	氈 氉 氊
+14	氋
+15	氌
+18	氍
+22	氎

== Sinogram ==
The radical is also used as an independent Chinese character. It is one of the Kyōiku kanji or Kanji taught in elementary school in Japan. It is a second grade kanji.

== Literature ==
- Fazzioli, Edoardo (1987). Chinese calligraphy : from pictograph to ideogram : the history of 214 essential Chinese/Japanese characters. calligraphy by Rebecca Hon Ko. New York: Abbeville Press. ISBN 0-89659-774-1.
- Lunde, Ken (Jan 5, 2009). "Appendix J: Japanese Character Sets" (PDF). CJKV Information Processing: Chinese, Japanese, Korean & Vietnamese Computing (Second ed.). Sebastopol, Calif.: O'Reilly Media. ISBN 978-0-596-51447-1.
