= Radical 196 =

Chinese character radical

鳥
- Radical 196 (U+2FC3)
- 鳥 (U+9CE5) "bird"

Pronunciations
- Pinyin: niǎo
- Bopomofo: ㄋㄧㄠˇ
- Wade–Giles: niao3
- Cantonese Yale: niu5
- Jyutping: niu5
- Japanese Kana: チョウ chō (on'yomi) とり tori (kun'yomi)
- Sino-Korean: 조 jo
- Hán-Việt: điểu, đeo, đéo, đẽo

Names
- Chinese name(s): （鸟字旁/鳥字旁） niǎozìpáng
- Japanese name(s): 鳥/とり tori
- Hangul: 새 sae

Stroke order animation

Stroke order of the simplified form 鸟

Radical 196 or radical bird (鳥部) meaning "bird" is one of the 6 Kangxi radicals (214 radicals in total) composed of 11 strokes.

In the Kangxi Dictionary, there are 750 characters (out of 49,030) to be found under this radical.

鸟 (5 strokes), the simplified form of 鳥, is the 114th indexing component in the Table of Indexing Chinese Character Components predominantly adopted by Simplified Chinese dictionaries published in mainland China, with 鳥 listed as its associated indexing component. The simplified form 鸟 is derived from the cursive script form of 鳥.

== Evolution ==
=== 鳥 ===
Shang dynasty Oracle bone script character

Shang dynasty Bronze script

Western Zhou Bronze script

Small seal script character

=== 烏 ===
It is in Kangxi radical 火+6.

Western Zhou Bronze script

Small seal script character

=== 舄/舃 ===
It is in Kangxi radical 臼+6.

Small seal script character

=== 焉 ===
A ligature of 於是. It is in Kangxi radical 火+7.

Warring States period bronze script

Qin slip script

Small seal script character

== Derived characters ==
Strokes	Characters (鳥)	Characters (鸟)
+0	鳥	鸟^{SC} (=鳥)
+1	鳦	
+2	鳧 鳨 鳩 鳪 鳫 (=雁 -> 隹) 鳬 (=鳧) 鳭 鳮 (=鷄=雞 -> 隹) 鳯 (=鳳) 鳰	鸠^{SC} (=鳩) 鸡^{SC} (=鷄=雞 -> 隹)
+3	鳱 鳲 鳳 鳴 鳵 鳶	鸢^{SC} (=鳶) 鸣^{SC} (=鳴) 鸤^{SC} (=鳲)
+4	鳷 鳸 (=雇 -> 隹) 鳹 鳺 鳻 鳼 鳽 鳾 鳿 鴀 鴁 鴂 (=鴃) 鴃 鴄 鴅 鴆 鴇 鴈 (=雁 -> 隹) 鴉 鴋 鴌 鴍 鴎^{JP} (=鷗)	鸥^{SC} (=鷗) 鸦^{SC} (=鴉) 鸧^{SC} (=鶬) 鸨^{SC} (=鴇) 鸩^{SC} (=鴆)
+5	鴊 鴏 鴐 鴑 (=鴽) 鴒 鴓 鴔 鴕 鴖 (=蚊 -> 虫 𪂆) 鴗 鴘 鴙 鴚 鴛 鴜 鴝 鴞 鴟 鴠 鴡 (=雎 -> 隹) 鴢 鴣 鴤 鴥 鴦 鴧 (=鴥) 鴨 鴩 鴪 鴫 鴬^{JP} (=鷽/鶯)	鸪^{SC} (=鴣) 鸫^{SC} (=鶇) 鸬^{SC} (=鸕) 鸭^{SC} (=鴨) 鸮^{SC} (=鴞) 鸯^{SC} (=鴦) 鸰^{SC} (=鴒) 鸱^{SC} (=鴟) 鸲^{SC} (=鴝) 鸳^{SC} (=鴛) 鸴^{SC} (=鷽) 鸵^{SC} (=鴕) 鸶^{SC} (=鷥)
+6	鴭 鴮 鴯 鴰 鴱 鴲 鴳 鴴 鴵 鴶 鴷 鴸 鴹 鴺 鴻 鴼 (=鵅 鴹) 鴽 鴾 鴿 鵀 鵁 鵂 鵃 鵄 鵅 鵆 鵇 鵈 鵉 (=鸞)	鸷^{SC} (=鷙) 鸸^{SC} (=鴯) 鸹^{SC} (=鴰) 鸺^{SC} (=鵂) 鸻^{SC} (=鴴) 鸼^{SC} (=鵃) 鸽^{SC} (=鴿) 鸾^{SC} (=鸞) 鸿^{SC} (=鴻)
+7	鵊 鵋 鵌 鵍 鵎 鵏 鵐 鵑 鵒 鵓 鵔 鵕 鵖 鵗 鵘 鵙 鵚 鵛 鵜 鵝 鵞 (=鵝) 鵟 鵠 鵡 鵢 鵣 鵥	鹀^{SC} (=鵐) 鹁^{SC} (=鵓) 鹂^{SC} (=鸝) 鹃^{SC} (=鵑) 鹄^{SC} (=鵠) 鹅^{SC} (=鵝) 鹆^{SC} (=鵒) 鹇^{SC} (=鷳) 鹈^{SC} (=鵜)
+8	鵦 鵧 鵨 鵩 鵪 鵫 鵬 鵭 鵮 鵯 鵰 鵱 鵲 鵳 鵴 鵵 鵶 鵷 鵸 鵹 鵺 鵻 鵼 鵽 鵾 鵿 鶀 (=䳢) 鶁 鶂 (=鷁) 鶃 (=鶂) 鶄 鶅 鶆 鶇 鶈 鶉 鶊 鶋 鶌 鶍 鶎 鶏^{JP} (=鷄=雞) 鶑 (=鶯)	鹉^{SC} (=鵡) 鹊^{SC} (=鵲) 鹋^{SC} (=鶓) 鹌^{SC} (=鵪) 鹍^{SC} (=鵾) 鹎^{SC} (=鵯) 鹏^{SC} (=鵬) 鹐^{SC} (=鵮) 鹑^{SC} (=鶉) 鹒^{SC} (=鶊) 鹓^{SC} (=鵷) 鹔^{SC} (=鷫)
+9	鶐 鶒 鶓 鶔 鶕 (=鵪) 鶖 鶗 鶘 鶙 鶚 鶛 鶜 鶝 鶞 鶟 鶠 鶡 鶢 鶣 鶤 鶥 鶦 鶧 鶨 鶩 鶪 鶫	鹕^{SC} (=鶘) 鹖^{SC} (=鶡) 鹗^{SC} (=鶚) 鹙^{SC} (=鶖) 鹚^{SC} (=鶿) 鹛^{SC} (=鶥) 鹜^{SC} (=鶩)
+10	鶬 鶭 鶮 鶯 鶰 鶱 鶲 鶳 鶴 鶵 鶶 鶷 鶸 鶹 鶺 鶻 鶼 鶽 鶾 鶿 鷀 (=鶿) 鷁 鷂 鷃 (=鴳) 鷄 (=雞 -> 隹) 鷅 鷆 (=鷏) 鷇 鷈 (=鷉) 鷉 鷊 鷌 鷍 鷎 鷏	鹘^{SC} (=鶻) 鹝^{SC} (=鷊) 鹞^{SC} (=鷂) 鹟^{SC} (=鶲) 鹠^{SC} (=鶹) 鹡^{SC} (=鶺) 鹢^{SC} (=鷁) 鹣^{SC} (=鶼) 鹤^{SC} (=鶴)
+11	鷋 鷐 鷑 鷒 鷓 鷔 鷕 鷖 鷗 鷘 (=鶒) 鷙 鷚 鷛 鷜 鷝 鷞 鷟	鹥^{SC} (=鷖) 鹦^{SC} (=鸚) 鹧^{SC} (=鷓) 鹨^{SC} (=鷚)
+12	鷡 鷢 鷣 鷤 鷥 鷦 鷧 鷨 鷩 鷪 鷫 鷬 鷭 鷮 鷯 鷰 (=燕 -> 火) 鷱 鷲 鷳 鷴 鷵 鷶 鷷 鷸 鷺 鷻 鷼 (=鷳)	鹩^{SC} (=鷯) 鹪^{SC} (=鷦) 鹫^{SC} (=鷲) 鹬^{SC} (=鷸)
+13	鷹 鷽 鷾 鷿 鸀 鸁 鸂 鸃 鸄 鸅 鸆 鸇 鸈 鸉 鸊 (=鷿) 䴉	鹭^{SC} (=鷺) 鹮^{SC} (=䴉) 鹯^{SC} (=鸇) 鹰^{SC} (=鷹)
+14	鸋 鸌 鸍 鸎 (=鶯) 鸏 鸐 鸑 鸒	鹱^{SC} (=鸌) 鹲^{SC} (=鸏)
+15	鸓 鸔	
+16	鸕 鸖 (=鶴) 鸗	
+17	鸘 鸙 鸚	鹳^{SC} (=鸛) 鹴^{SC} (=鸘)
+18	鸛 鸜	
+19	鸝 鸞	

== Sinogram ==
The radical is also used as an independent Chinese character. It is one of the Kyōiku kanji or Kanji taught in elementary school in Japan. It is a second grade kanji.

== Literature ==
- Fazzioli, Edoardo (1987). Chinese calligraphy : from pictograph to ideogram : the history of 214 essential Chinese/Japanese characters. calligraphy by Rebecca Hon Ko. New York: Abbeville Press. ISBN 0-89659-774-1.
- Kunde, Ken (Jan 5, 2009). "Appendix J: Japanese Character Sets" (PDF). CJKV Information Processing: Chinese, Japanese, Korean & Vietnamese Computing (Second ed.). Sebastopol, Calif.: O'Reilly Media. ISBN 978-0-596-51447-1.
