= Radical 207 =

Chinese character radical

鼓
- Radical 207 (U+2FCE)
- 鼓 (U+9F13) "drum"

Pronunciations
- Pinyin: gǔ
- Bopomofo: ㄍㄨˇ
- Wade–Giles: ku3
- Cantonese Yale: gu2
- Jyutping: gu2
- Japanese Kana: コ, ク ko, ku つづみ tsuzumi
- Sino-Korean: 고 go
- Hán-Việt: cổ

Names
- Japanese name(s): 鼓 tsuzumi
- Hangul: 북 buk

Stroke order animation

Radical 207 meaning "drum" (鼓部) is 1 of 4 Kangxi radicals (214 radicals total) composed of 13 strokes.

In the Kangxi Dictionary there are 46 characters (out of 49,030) to be found under this radical.

== Evolution ==
Ideogrammic compound: 壴 ("drum") + 支 ("hand holding drumstick").

Shang dynasty Oracle bone script

Western Zhou Bronze script

Large seal script character

Small seal script character

=== 壴 ===
Kangxi dictionary listed 壴 under 士+6. Compare 豆.

Shang dynasty Oracle bone script

Western Zhou Bronze script

Large seal script character

Small seal script character

== Characters with Radical 207 ==
| strokes | character |
|---|---|
| +0 | 鼓 鼔 |
| +5 | 鼕 鼖 |
| +6 | 鼗 |
| +8 | 鼘 鼙 鼚 鼛 |
| +10 | 鼜 |
| +11 | 鼝 鼞 |
| +12 | 鼟 |

== Literature ==
- Fazzioli, Edoardo (1987). Chinese calligraphy : from pictograph to ideogram : the history of 214 essential Chinese/Japanese characters. calligraphy by Rebecca Hon Ko. New York: Abbeville Press. ISBN 0-89659-774-1.
- Lunde, Ken (Jan 5, 2009). "Appendix J: Japanese Character Sets" (PDF). CJKV Information Processing: Chinese, Japanese, Korean & Vietnamese Computing (Second ed.). Sebastopol, Calif.: O'Reilly Media. ISBN 978-0-596-51447-1.
