= Radical 128 =

Chinese character radical

耳
- Radical 128 (U+2F7F)
- 耳 (U+8033) "ear"

Pronunciations
- Pinyin: ěr
- Bopomofo: ㄦˇ
- Gwoyeu Romatzyh: eel
- Wade–Giles: êrh^{3}
- Cantonese Yale: yíh
- Jyutping: ji5
- Japanese Kana: ジ ji / ニ ni (on'yomi) みみ mimi (kun'yomi)
- Sino-Korean: 이 i

Names
- Chinese name(s): 耳字旁 ěrzìpáng
- Japanese name(s): 耳/みみ mimi 耳偏/みみへん mimihen
- Hangul: 귀 gwi

Stroke order animation

Radical 128 or radical ear (耳部) meaning "ear" in English is one of the 29 Kangxi radicals (214 radicals in total) composed of 6 strokes.

In the Kangxi Dictionary, there are 172 characters (out of 49,030) to be found under this radical.

耳 is also the 124th indexing component in the Table of Indexing Chinese Character Components predominantly adopted by Simplified Chinese dictionaries published in mainland China.

== Evolution ==
Shang dynasty Oracle bone script

Shang dynasty Oracle bone script variant

Shang dynasty Bronze script

Western Zhou Bronze script

Chu slip and silk script

Qin slip script

Large seal script character

Small seal script character

== Derived characters ==
Strokes	Characters
+0	耳
+1	耴
+2	耵
+3	耶 耷
+4	耸^{SC} (=聳) 耹 耺 耻^{SC} (=恥) 耼 (=聃) 耽 耾 耿 聀 (=職) 聁 聂^{SC} (=聶)
+5	聃 聄 聅 聆 聇 聈 聉 聊 聋^{SC} (=聾) 职^{SC} (=職) 聍^{SC} (=聹)
+6	聎 聏 聐 聑 聒 聓 (=婿 -> 女) 联^{SC} (=聯) 聠
+7	聕 聖 聗 聘
+8	聙 聚 聛 聜 聝 聞 聟 聡^{JP} (=聰) 聢 聣
+9	聤 聥 聦 (=聰) 聧 聨 聩^{SC} (=聵) 聪^{SC} (=聰) 聫 (=聯)
+10	聬 聭
+11	聯 聰 聱 聲 聳
+12	聮 (=聯) 聴^{JP} (=聽) 聵 聶 職
+13	聸
+14	聹 聺 聻 聼 (=聽)
+16	聽 聾

== Sinogram ==
Independently it is a Chinese character. It is one of the Kyōiku kanji or Kanji taught in elementary school in Japan. It is a first grade kanji.

== See also ==
- Mimi (ミミ、耳、彌彌、美美) a Japanese morpheme sometimes written with the character
