= Radical 11 =

Chinese character radical

入
- Radical 11 (U+2F0A)
- 入 (U+5165) "enter"

Pronunciations
- Pinyin: rù
- Bopomofo: ㄖㄨˋ
- Gwoyeu Romatzyh: ruh
- Wade–Giles: ju^{4}
- Cantonese Yale: yahp
- Jyutping: jap6
- Pe̍h-ōe-jī: ji̍p
- Japanese Kana: ニュウ nyū (on'yomi) い-る i-ru (kun'yomi)
- Sino-Korean: 입 ip
- Hán-Việt: nhập

Names
- Japanese name(s): 入頭/いりがしら irigashira 入屋根/いりやね iriyane
- Hangul: 들 deul

Stroke order animation

Radical 11 or radical enter (入部) meaning "enter", "come in (to)", "join" is one of 23 of the 214 Kangxi radicals that are composed of 2 strokes.

In the Kangxi Dictionary, there are 28 characters (out of 49,030) to be found under this radical.

In Simplified Chinese, this radical is affiliated to radical 9 (Radical man, 人), and many Chinese characters formerly consisted of 入 were adjusted and fell under radical man. While most Japanese dictionaries keep radical 11 as an independent radical, similar adjustments also happened in Japanese kanji simplification.

== Evolution ==
Unrelated to 人.

Oracle bone script character

Bronze script character

Chu slip and silk script

Large seal script character

Small seal script character

== Derived characters ==
Strokes	Characters
+0	入
+1	兦 (=亡 -> 亠)
+2	內
+3	㒰 㒱
+4	㒲 全
+5	㒳 (=兩) 㒴
+6	兩
+7	兪^{Kangxi} (=俞 -> 人)

== Variant forms ==
There is a design nuance in different printing typefaces for this radical. Traditionally, the second stroke 入 starts with a short horizontal line in printing typeface. In handwriting form, the right-falling stroke goes more smoothly. The traditional typeface design is used in modern Traditional Chinese, Japanese, and Korean typefaces. In Mainland China, after the adoption of Simplified Chinese and the new character forms, the standard printing typeface design for 入 was altered to look like its handwriting form. Depending on each font's design, either form could be used in Traditional Chinese typefaces and Simplified Chinese typefaces.

The short horizontal line exists only in printing typeface, not in any handwriting form.

with a short line	without the short line
入	入

== Sinogram ==
The radical is also used as an independent Chinese character. It is one of the kyōiku kanji or kanji taught in elementary school in Japan. It is a first grade kanji.

== Literature ==
- Fazzioli, Edoardo (1987). Chinese calligraphy : from pictograph to ideogram : the history of 214 essential Chinese/Japanese characters. calligraphy by Rebecca Hon Ko. New York: Abbeville Press. ISBN 0-89659-774-1.
- Leyi Li: “Tracing the Roots of Chinese Characters: 500 Cases”. Beijing 1993, ISBN 978-7-5619-0204-2
- KangXi: page 125, character 32
- Dai Kanwa Jiten: character 1415
- Hanyu Da Zidian: volume 1, page 102, character 1
- Dae Jaweon: page 266, character 18
