= 尺 =

尺 is a Chinese character referring to a unit of measurement. It may refer to:

- Shaku (unit of length), in Japan, also known as the "Japanese foot"
- Chi (unit), in China, also known as the "Chinese foot"
- "Taiwanese foot", which is read as Chi but has the same length as the Shaku
