= Radical 197 =

Chinese character radical

鹵
- Radical 197 (U+2FC4)
- 鹵 (U+9E75) "salt"

Pronunciations
- Pinyin: lǔ
- Bopomofo: ㄌㄨˇ
- Wade–Giles: lu3
- Cantonese Yale: lou5
- Jyutping: lou5
- Japanese Kana: ロ ro (on'yomi) しお shio (kun'yomi)
- Sino-Korean: 로 ro
- Hán-Việt: lỗ

Names
- Japanese name(s): ろ ro しお shio
- Hangul: 소금밭 sogeumbat

Stroke order animation

Radical 197 or radical salt (鹵部) meaning "salt" is one of the 6 Kangxi radicals (214 radicals in total) composed of 11 strokes.

In the Kangxi Dictionary, there are 44 characters (out of 49,030) to be found under this radical.

卤 (7 strokes), the simplified form of 鹵 is the 156th indexing component in the Table of Indexing Chinese Character Components predominantly adopted by Simplified Chinese dictionaries published in mainland China, while the traditional form 鹵 is listed as its associated indexing component.

== Evolution ==
Oracle bone script character

Bronze script character

Large seal script character

Small seal script character

== Derived characters ==
| Strokes | Characters |
|---|---|
| +0 | 卤^{SC} (=鹵) 鹵 |
| +4 | 鹶 |
| +5 | 鹷 |
| +8 | 鹸^{JP} (=鹼) |
| +9 | 鹹 鹾^{SC} (=鹺) |
| +10 | 鹺 鹻 (=鹼) |
| +13 | 鹼 鹽 |

== Literature ==
- Fazzioli, Edoardo (1987). Chinese calligraphy : from pictograph to ideogram : the history of 214 essential Chinese/Japanese characters. calligraphy by Rebecca Hon Ko. New York: Abbeville Press. ISBN 0-89659-774-1.
- Lunde, Ken (Jan 5, 2009). "Appendix J: Japanese Character Sets" (PDF). CJKV Information Processing: Chinese, Japanese, Korean & Vietnamese Computing (Second ed.). Sebastopol, Calif.: O'Reilly Media. ISBN 978-0-596-51447-1.
