= Radical 136 =

Chinese character radical

舛
- Radical 136 (U+2F87)
- 舛 (U+821B) "oppose"

Pronunciations
- Pinyin: chuǎn
- Bopomofo: ㄔㄨㄢˇ
- Wade–Giles: ch'uan3
- Cantonese Yale: chyun2
- Jyutping: cyun2
- Japanese Kana: セン sen (on'yomi) そむ-く somu-ku (kun'yomi)
- Sino-Korean: 천 cheon

Names
- Japanese name(s): ます masu 舞脚/まいあし maiashi
- Hangul: 어그러질 eogeureojil

Stroke order animation

Radical 136 or radical oppose (舛部) meaning "oppose" is one of the 29 Kangxi radicals (214 radicals in total) composed of 6 strokes.

In the Kangxi Dictionary, there are 10 characters (out of 49,030) to be found under this radical.

舛 is not listed as an indexing component in the Table of Indexing Chinese Character Components predominantly adopted by Simplified Chinese dictionaries published in mainland China.

== Evolution ==
Two 夊's ("foot") pointing away from each other.

Large seal script character

Small seal script character

== Derived characters ==
Strokes	Characters
+0	舛
+6	舜
+7	舝
+8	舞

== Literature ==
- Fazzioli, Edoardo (1987). Chinese calligraphy : from pictograph to ideogram : the history of 214 essential Chinese/Japanese characters. calligraphy by Rebecca Hon Ko. New York: Abbeville Press. ISBN 0-89659-774-1.
- Lunde, Ken (Jan 5, 2009). "Appendix J: Japanese Character Sets" (PDF). CJKV Information Processing: Chinese, Japanese, Korean & Vietnamese Computing (Second ed.). Sebastopol, Calif.: O'Reilly Media. ISBN 978-0-596-51447-1.
