= Radical 141 =

Chinese character radical

虍
- Radical 141 (U+2F8C)
- 虍 (U+864D) "tiger"

Pronunciations
- Pinyin: hū
- Bopomofo: ㄏㄨ
- Gwoyeu Romatzyh: hu
- Wade–Giles: hu^{1}
- Cantonese Yale: fu2
- Jyutping: fu2, fu1
- Japanese Kana: コ ko (on'yomi)
- Sino-Korean: 호 ho

Names
- Chinese name(s): 虎字頭/虎字头 hǔzìtóu
- Japanese name(s): 虎頭/とらがしら toragashira 虎冠/とらかんむり torakanmuri
- Hangul: 호피무늬 hopi muneui

Stroke order animation

Radical 141 or radical tiger (虍部) meaning "tiger" is one of the 29 Kangxi radicals (214 radicals in total) composed of 6 strokes.

In the Kangxi Dictionary, there are 114 characters (out of 49,030) to be found under this radical.

虍 is also the 130th indexing component in the Table of Indexing Chinese Character Components predominantly adopted by Simplified Chinese dictionaries published in mainland China, with 虎 being its associated indexing component.

== Evolution ==
=== 虍 ===
Shang dynasty Oracle bone script

Shang dynasty Oracle bone script variant

Bronze script character

Large seal script character

Small seal script character

=== 虎 ===
Shang dynasty Oracle bone script

Shang dynasty Bronze script

Western Zhou Bronze script

Spring and Autumn period Bronze script

Chu slip and silk script

Qin slip script

Shuowen ancient script

Small seal script character

== Derived characters ==
Strokes	Characters
+0	虍
+2	虎 虏^{SC} (=虜)
+3	彪 虐
+4	虑^{SC} (=慮 -> 心) 虓 虔
+5	處 虖 (=呼 -> 口 / 乎 -> 丿) 虗 (=虛) 虘 虙 虚^{SC/JP} (=虛)
+6	虛 虜 虝 (=虎)
+7	虞 號
+8	虠 虡
+9	虢 虣
+10	虤 虥 虦
+11	虧 虨
+12	虩
+20	虪

== Literature ==
- Fazzioli, Edoardo (1987). Chinese calligraphy : from pictograph to ideogram : the history of 214 essential Chinese/Japanese characters. calligraphy by Rebecca Hon Ko. New York: Abbeville Press. ISBN 0-89659-774-1.
- Lunde, Ken (Jan 5, 2009). "Appendix J: Japanese Character Sets" (PDF). CJKV Information Processing: Chinese, Japanese, Korean & Vietnamese Computing (Second ed.). Sebastopol, Calif.: O'Reilly Media. ISBN 978-0-596-51447-1.
