= Radical 35 =

Chinese character radical

夊
- Radical 35 (U+2F22)
- 夊 (U+590A) "go slowly"

Pronunciations
- Pinyin: suī
- Bopomofo: ㄙㄨㄟ
- Gwoyeu Romatzyh: suei
- Wade–Giles: sui^{1}
- Cantonese Yale: sēui
- Jyutping: seoi1
- Pe̍h-ōe-jī: soe
- Japanese Kana: スイ sui (on'yomi)
- Sino-Korean: 쇠 soe

Names
- Japanese name(s): 夊繞/すいにょう suinyō すいにゅう suinyū 夏脚/なつあし natsuashi
- Hangul: 천천히걸을 cheoncheonhi georeul

Stroke order animation

Radical 35 or radical go slowly (夊部) is one of the 31 Kangxi radicals (214 radicals total) composed of three strokes.

In the Kangxi Dictionary, there are 23 characters (out of 49,030) to be found under this radical.

This radical is merged with radical go (夂) in Simplified Chinese and the writing forms are unified as 夂 (principal indexing component #44 in the Table of Indexing Chinese Character Components). No associated indexing component was left after the merger.

== Evolution ==
Component of 舛 and 韋; compare 止; unrelated to 攵.

Oracle bone script character

Oracle bone script character variant

Small seal script character

== Derived characters ==
Strokes	Character
+0	夊
+4	夋
+5	夌
+6	変^{JP} (=變 -> 言) 复
+7	夎 夏
+11	夐
+15	夑
+16	夒 夓
+17	夔

== Literature ==
- Fazzioli, Edoardo (1987). Chinese calligraphy : from pictograph to ideogram : the history of 214 essential Chinese/Japanese characters. calligraphy by Rebecca Hon Ko. New York: Abbeville Press. ISBN 0-89659-774-1.
- Lunde, Ken (Jan 5, 2009). "Appendix J: Japanese Character Sets" (PDF). CJKV Information Processing: Chinese, Japanese, Korean & Vietnamese Computing (Second ed.). Sebastopol, Calif.: O'Reilly Media. ISBN 978-0-596-51447-1.
