= Radical 34 =

Chinese character radical

夂
- Radical 34 (U+2F21)
- 夂 (U+5902) "go"

Pronunciations
- Pinyin: zhǐ
- Bopomofo: ㄓˇ
- Wade–Giles: chih3
- Cantonese Yale: jī
- Jyutping: zi1
- Pe̍h-ōe-jī: chí
- Japanese Kana: チ chi (on'yomi)
- Sino-Korean: 치 chi

Names
- Chinese name(s): 折文旁 zhéwénpáng
- Japanese name(s): 冬頭/ふゆがしら fuyugashira 夂冠/ちかんむり chikanmuri ノ又冠/のまたかんむり nomatakanmuri
- Hangul: 뒤져올 dwijeool

Stroke order animation

Radical 34 or radical go (夂部) meaning "go" is one of the 31 Kangxi radicals (214 radicals total) composed of three strokes.

In the Kangxi Dictionary, there are 11 characters (out of 49,030) to be found under this radical.

In Traditional Chinese, radical 34 (夂, go) and radical 35 (夊, go slowly) are slightly different, with the right-falling stroke in 夊 (radical 35, go slowly) crossing the first stroke, while that in 夂 (radical 34, go) does not. Since there is no commonly used modern Traditional Chinese character under radical 34, this radical is omitted in some Traditional Chinese dictionaries. In addition, the most common graphic form of radical 66 (攴, tap; hit) when it appears on the right side of a compound character (攵) is also very similar graphically.

In Simplified Chinese and xin zixing, 夂 and 夊 were officially unified as 夂 (go), which then became the 44th indexing component in the Table of Indexing Chinese Character Components predominantly adopted by Simplified Chinese dictionaries published in mainland China. No associated indexing component was left after the merger.

== Evolution ==
Unrelated to 攵.

Shuowen seal script character

== Derived characters ==
Strokes	Characters
+0	夂
+1	夃
+2	処^{JP} (=處 -> 虍) 处^{SC} (=處 -> 虍)
+3	夅
+4	夆
+5	备^{SC} (=備 -> 人)
+6	夈

== Literature ==
- Fazzioli, Edoardo (1987). Chinese calligraphy : from pictograph to ideogram : the history of 214 essential Chinese/Japanese characters. calligraphy by Rebecca Hon Ko. New York: Abbeville Press. ISBN 0-89659-774-1.
- Lunde, Ken (Jan 5, 2009). "Appendix J: Japanese Character Sets" (PDF). CJKV Information Processing: Chinese, Japanese, Korean & Vietnamese Computing (Second ed.). Sebastopol, Calif.: O'Reilly Media. ISBN 978-0-596-51447-1.
