= Radical 107 =

Chinese character radical

皮
- Radical 107 (U+2F6A)
- 皮 (U+76AE) "skin, hide"

Pronunciations
- Pinyin: pí
- Bopomofo: ㄆㄧˊ
- Wade–Giles: p'i2
- Cantonese Yale: pei4
- Jyutping: pei4
- Japanese Kana: ヒ hi (on'yomi) かわ kawa (kun'yomi)
- Sino-Korean: 피 pi

Names
- Japanese name(s): 毛皮/けがわ kegawa ひのかわ hinokawa
- Hangul: 가죽 gajuk

Stroke order animation

Radical 107 or radical skin (皮部) meaning "skin" or "hide" is one of the 23 Kangxi radicals (214 radicals in total) composed of 5 strokes.

In the Kangxi Dictionary, there are 94 characters (out of 49,030) to be found under this radical.

皮 is also the 119th indexing component in the Table of Indexing Chinese Character Components predominantly adopted by Simplified Chinese dictionaries published in mainland China.

== Evolution ==
A hand (又) and animal hide (compare 革).

Bronze script character

Large seal script character

Small seal script character

== Derived characters ==
Strokes	Characters
+0	皮
+3	皯
+5	皰 皱^{SC} (=皺)
+6	皲^{SC} (=皸)
+7	皳 皴
+8	皵
+9	皶 皷 皸 皹 (=皸)
+10	皺
+11	皻
+12	皼
+13	皽
+15	皾

== Sinogram ==
The radical is also used as an independent Chinese character. It is one of the kyōiku kanji or kanji taught in elementary school in Japan. It is a third grade kanji.

== Literature ==
- Fazzioli, Edoardo (1987). Chinese calligraphy : from pictograph to ideogram : the history of 214 essential Chinese/Japanese characters. calligraphy by Rebecca Hon Ko. New York: Abbeville Press. ISBN 0-89659-774-1.
- Lunde, Ken (Jan 5, 2009). "Appendix J: Japanese Character Sets" (PDF). CJKV Information Processing: Chinese, Japanese, Korean & Vietnamese Computing (Second ed.). Sebastopol, Calif.: O'Reilly Media. ISBN 978-0-596-51447-1.
