= Radical 30 =

Chinese character radical

口
- Radical 30 (U+2F1D)
- 口 (U+53E3) "mouth"

Pronunciations
- Pinyin: kǒu
- Bopomofo: ㄎㄡˇ
- Gwoyeu Romatzyh: koou
- Wade–Giles: kʻou^{3}
- Cantonese Yale: háu
- Jyutping: hau2
- Pe̍h-ōe-jī: kháu (col.) khó͘ (lit.)
- Japanese Kana: コー kō (on'yomi) くち kuchi (kun'yomi)
- Sino-Korean: 구 ku

Names
- Chinese name(s): (Side)口字旁 kǒuzìpáng (Top)口字頭 kǒuzìtǒu (Bottom)口字底 kǒuzìdǐ
- Japanese name(s): 口偏/くちへん kuchihen
- Hangul: 입 ip

Stroke order animation

Radical 30 or radical mouth (口部), which means mouth, is one of 31 of the 214 Kangxi radicals that are composed of 3 strokes. In the Kangxi Dictionary, there are 1,146 characters (out of 40,000) to be found under this radical. 口 is also the 37th indexing component in the Table of Indexing Chinese Character Components predominantly adopted by Simplified Chinese dictionaries published in mainland China.

== Evolution ==
Component of 龠; unrelated to 囗 (enclosure) and hangul ㅁ (mieum).

Oracle bone script character

Bronze script character

Chu slip and silk script

Large seal script character

Small seal script character

=== 呂 ===
Originally meant ingot. Kana ロ and ろ (ro) came from this kanji.

Bronze script character

== Derived characters ==
Strokes	Characters
+0	口
+2	古 句 另 叧 叨 叩 只 叫 召 叭 叮 可 台 叱 史 右 叴 叵 叶 (also SC form of 葉 -> 艸) 号^{SC/JP} (=號 -> 虍) 司 叹^{SC} (=嘆) 叺 叻 叼 叽^{SC} (=嘰)
+3	叾 叿 吀 吁 (also SC form of 籲 -> 竹) 吂 吃 各 吅 吆 吇 合 吉 吊 吋 同 名 后 吏 吐 向 吒 吓 (also SC form of 嚇) 吔 吕^{SC} (=呂) 吖 吗^{SC} (=嗎) 吸
+4	吘 吙 吚 君 吜 吝 吞 吟 吠 吡 吢 吣 吤 吥 否 吧 吨 (also SC form of 噸) 吩 吪 含 听^{SC} (=聽 -> 耳) 吭 吮 启^{SC} (=啟 -> 攴) 吰 吱 吲 吳 吴^{SC} (=吳) 吵 吶 吷 吹 吺 吻 吼 吽 吾 吿 呀 呁 呂 呃 呄 呅 呆 呇 呈 呉^{JP} (=吳) 告 呋 呌 呍 呎 呏 呐^{SC} (=吶) 呑 (=吞) 呒^{SC} (=嘸) 呓^{SC} (=囈) 呔 呕^{SC} (=嘔) 呖^{SC} (=嚦) 呗^{SC} (=唄) 员^{SC} (=員) 呙^{SC} (=咼) 呚 呛^{SC} (=嗆) 呜^{SC} (=嗚)
+5	呝 呞 呟 呠 呡 呢 呣 呤 呥 呦 呧 周 呩 呪^{JP} (=咒) 呫 呬 呭 呮 呯 呰 呱 呲 味 呴 呵 呶 呷 呸 呹 呺 呻 呼 命 呾 呿 咀 咁 咂 咃 咄 咅 咆 咇 咈 咉 咊 (=和) 咋 和 咍 咎 咏 咐 咑 咒 咓 咔 咕 咖 咗 咘 咙^{SC} (=嚨) 咚 咛^{SC} (=嚀) 咜 咝^{SC} (=噝) 咼^{GB TC variant}
+6	咞 咟 咠 咡 咢 咣 咤 咥 咦 咧 咨 咩 咪 咫 咬 咭 咮 咯 咰 咱 咲 咳 咴 咵 咶 咷 咸 咹 咺 咻 咼^{Traditional/JP variant} 咽 咾 咿 哀 品 哂 哃 哄 哅 哆 哇 哈 哉 哊 哋 哌 响^{SC} (=響 -> 音) 哎 哏 哐 哑^{SC} (=啞) 哒^{SC} (=噠) 哓^{SC} (=嘵) 哔^{SC} (=嗶) 哕^{SC} (=噦) 哖 哗 哘 哙^{SC} (=噲) 哚 哛 哜 哝^{SC} (=噥) 哞 哟^{SC} (=喲)
+7	哠 員 哢 哣 哤 哥 哦 哧 哨 哩 哪 哫 哬 哭 哮 哯 哰 哱 哲 哳 哴 哵 哶 哷 哸 哹 哺 哻 哼 哽 哾 哿 唀 唁 唂 唃 唄 唅 唆 唇^{SC/JP/variant} (=脣 -> 肉) 唈 唉 唊 唋 唌 唍 唎 唏 唐 唑 唒 唓 唔 唕 唖^{JP} (=啞) 唳 啄 唗 唘 (=啓=啟 -> 攴) 唙 唚 唛^{SC} (=嘜) 唜^{KO} 唝^{SC} (=嗊) 唞 唟^{KO} 唠^{SC} (=嘮) 唡^{SC} (=啢) 唢^{SC} (=嗩) 唣 唤^{SC} (=喚) 唥 唦 唧
+8	唨 唩 唪 唫 唬 唭 售 唯 唰 唱 唲 唴 唵 唶 唷 唸 唹 唺 唻 唼 唽 唾 唿 啀 啁 啂 啃 啅 商 啇 啈 啉 啊 啋 啌 啍 啎 問 啐 啑 啒 啓^{JP/GB TC} (=啟 -> 攴) 啔 (=啓=啟 -> 攴) 啕 啖 啗 啘 啙 啚 (=圖 -> 囗) 啛 啜 啝 啞 啠 (=哲) 啡 啢 啣 啤 啥 啦 啧^{SC} (嘖) 啨 啩 啪 啫 啬^{SC} (=嗇) 啭^{SC} (=囀) 啮^{SC} (=嚙=齧 -> 齒) 啯^{SC} (=嘓) 啰^{SC} (=囉) 啱 啲 啳 啴^{SC} (=嘽) 啵 啶 啸^{SC} (=嘯) 啹 喎^{SC variant} 喝^{JP}
+9	啷 啺 啻 啼 啽 啾 啿 喀 喁 喂 喃 善 喅 喆 (=哲) 喇 喈 喉 喊 喋 喌 喍 喎^{TC variant} 喏 喐 喑 喒 (=咱) 喓 喔 喕 喖 喗 喘 喙 喚 喛 喜 喝^{SC/TC/KO} 喞^{Kangxi} (=唧) 喟 喠 喡 喢 喣 喤 喥 喦 喧 喨 喩^{Kangxi/JP/KO} (=喻) 喪 喫 喬 喭 單 喯 喰 喱 喲 喳 喴 喵 営^{JP} (=營 -> 火) 喷^{SC} (=噴) 喸^{KO} 喹 喺 喻 喼 喽^{SC} (=嘍) 喾^{SC} (=嚳) 嗏^{SC variant} 嗒^{SC variant} 嗗^{SC variant} 嗢^{SC/HK variant}
+10	喿 嗀 嗁 嗂 嗃 嗄 嗅 嗆 嗇 嗈 嗉 嗊 嗋 嗌 嗍 嗎 嗏^{TC variant} 嗐 嗑 嗒^{TC variant} 嗓 嗔 嗕 嗖 嗗^{TC variant} 嗘 嗙 嗚 嗛 嗜 嗝 嗞 嗟 嗠 嗡 嗢^{TC variant} 嗣 嗤 嗥 嗦 嗧 嗨 嗩 嗪 嗫^{SC} (=囁) 嗬 嗭^{KO} 嗮 嗯 嗰 嗱 嗲 嗳^{SC} (=噯) 嗴 嗵^{SC variant} 嗶^{GB TC variant} 嗷^{SC variant} 嗸^{SC variant} 嗼^{SC variant}
+11	嗵^{TC variant} 嗶^{Traditional variant} 嗷^{TC variant} 嗸^{TC variant} 嗹 嗺 嗻 嗼^{TC variant} 嗽 嗾 嗿 嘀 嘁 嘂 嘃 嘄 嘅 嘆 嘇 嘈 嘉 嘊 嘋 嘌 嘍 嘎 嘏 嘐 嘑 嘒 嘓 嘔 嘕 嘖 嘗 嘘^{SC/JP} (=噓) 嘙 嘚 嘛 嘜 嘝 嘞 嘟 嘠 (=嘎) 嘡 嘢 嘣 嘤^{SC} (=嚶) 嘥 嘦 嘧 嘨^{JP} (=嘯) 噌 噑 (=嗥)
+12	嘩 嘪 嘫 嘬 嘭 嘮 嘯 嘰 嘱 嘲 嘳 嘴 嘵 嘶 嘷(=嗥) 嘸 嘹 嘺 嘻 嘼 嘽 嘾 嘿 噀 噁 噂 噃 噄 噅 噆 噇 噈 噉 噊 噋 噍 噎 噏 噐(=器) 噒 噓 噔 噕 噖 噗 噘 噙 噚 噛^{JP} (=嚙) 噜^{SC} (=嚕) 噝 器^{JP} 噴 噠^{GB TC variant} 噢^{SC variant} 噧^{GB TC variant} 噶^{SC variant}
+13	器^{SC/TC/KO} 噞 噟 (=應 -> 心) 噠^{Traditional variant} 噡 噢^{TC variant} 噣 噤 噥 噦 噧^{Traditional variant} 噩 噪 噫 噬 噭 噮 噯 噰 噱 噲 噳 噵 (=道 -> 辵) 噶^{TC variant} 噷 噸 噹 噺^{JP} 噻 噼 噽 嚃^{SC variant} 嚆^{SC variant} 嚄^{SC variant}
+14	噾 噿 嚀 嚁 嚂 嚃^{TC variant} 嚄^{TC variant} 嚅 嚆^{TC variant} 嚇 嚈 嚉 嚊 嚋 嚌 嚍 嚎 嚏 嚐 嚑 嚒 嚓 嚝^{GB TC variant}
+15	嚔 嚕 嚖 嚗 嚘 嚙 嚚 嚛 嚜 嚝^{Traditional variant} 嚞 嚟 嚠 嚡 嚢^{JP} (=囊) 嚣^{SC} (=囂)
+16	嚤 嚥 嚦 嚧 嚨 嚩 嚪 嚫 嚬 嚭 嚮 嚯 嚰 嚴^{GB TC variant}
+17	嚱 嚲 嚳 嚴^{Traditional variant} 嚵 嚶 嚷 嚸 嚹 嚺 嚽^{GB TC variant} 嚾^{SC variant} 嚿^{SC variant}
+18	嚻 嚼 嚽^{Traditional variant} 嚾^{TC variant} 嚿^{TC variant} 囀 囁 囂 囃 囄 囆^{GB TC variant} 囈^{GB TC variant}
+19	囅 囆^{Traditional variant} 囇 囈^{Traditional variant} 囉 囊 囋 囎^{JP}
+20	囌^{GB TC variant} 囏 (=艱 -> 艮) 囐 囒^{GB TC variant}
+21	囌^{Traditional variant} 囍 囑 囒^{Traditional variant} 囓 囔 囕
+25	囖
+28	𡆟

== Hanzi ==
This functions as a Hanzi and a 1st grade Kyōiku kanji.
