= Kun'yomi =

Kanji reading based on the native Japanese pronunciation

Kun'yomi (訓読み; Japanese pronunciation: [kɯɰ̃.jo.mi], lit. 'explanatory reading' (Note: Kun (訓) here is a Chinese verb meaning to explain the meaning of text, particularly Chinese characters.)) or kundoku (訓読; [kɯn.do.kɯ]) (Note: Kanbun kundoku, or "explanatorily reading Chinese text", is essentially translating Chinese text into Japanese. On a larger scale, it is translating whole text, but on a smaller scale, this term also applies to translating individual characters as well. The translations were eventually uniquely identified with the characters and become their so-called "readings".) is the way of reading kanji characters using the native Japanese word that matches the meaning of the Chinese character when it was introduced. This pronunciation is contrasted with on'yomi, which is the reading based on the original Chinese pronunciation of the character.

Generally, kun'yomi readings are used for simple, singular words, including most verbs, while on'yomi readings are used for compound, technical words.

== Characteristics ==
Kun'yomi are characterized by the strict (C)V syllable structure of Japanese words (yamato kotoba). Most noun or adjective kun'yomi are two to three syllables long, while verb kun'yomi are usually between one and three syllables in length, not counting trailing hiragana called okurigana. Okurigana are not considered to be part of the internal reading of the character, although they are part of the reading of the word. A beginner in the language will rarely come across characters with long readings, but readings of three or even four syllables are not uncommon. This contrasts with on'yomi, which are only one or two syllables, as they were adapted from Chinese characters, which are almost all monosyllabic.

As with on'yomi, there can be multiple kun'yomi for the same kanji, and some kanji have no kun'yomi at all. For instance, the character for east, 東, has tō as its on'yomi, from Middle Chinese tung. However, Japanese already had two words for "east": higashi and azuma. Thus the kanji 東 had the latter readings added as kun'yomi. In contrast, the kanji 寸, denoting a Chinese unit of measurement (about 30 mm or 1.2 inch), has no native Japanese equivalent; it only has an on'yomi, sun, with no native kun'yomi.

== Usage ==
In a number of cases, multiple kanji were assigned to cover a single Japanese word. Typically when this occurs, the different kanji refer to specific shades of meaning. For instance, the word なおす, naosu, when written 治す, means "to heal an illness or sickness". When written 直す it means "to fix or correct something". Sometimes the distinction is very clear, although not always. Differences of opinion among reference works are not uncommon; one dictionary may say the kanji are equivalent, while another dictionary may draw distinctions of use. As a result, native speakers of the language may have trouble knowing which kanji to use and resort to personal preference or by writing the word in hiragana. This latter strategy is frequently employed with more complex cases such as もと moto, which has at least five different kanji: 元, 基, 本, 下, and 素, the first three of which have only very subtle differences. Another notable example is sakazuki "sake cup", which may be spelt as at least five different kanji: 杯, 盃, 巵/卮, and 坏; of these, the first two are common—formally 杯 is a small cup and 盃 a large cup.

Local dialectical readings of kanji are also classified under kun'yomi, most notably readings for words in Ryukyuan languages. Further, in rare cases gairaigo (borrowed words) have a single character associated with them, in which case this reading is formally classified as a kun'yomi, because the character is being used for meaning, not sound.

Most kokuji, Japanese-created Chinese characters, only have kun'yomi, although some have back-formed a pseudo-on'yomi by analogy with similar characters, such as 働 dō, from 動 dō, and there are even some, such as 腺 sen "gland", that have only an on'yomi.

== Examples ==
承る uketamawaru, 志 kokorozashi, and 詔 mikotonori have five morae represented by a single kanji, the longest readings in the jōyō character set. These unusually long readings are due to a single character representing a compound word:

- 承る is a single character for a compound verb, one component of which has a long reading.
  - It has an alternative spelling as 受け賜る u(ke)-tamawa(ru), hence (1+1)+3=5.
  - Compare common 受け付ける u(ke)-tsu(keru).
- 志 is a nominalization of the verb 志す which has a long reading kokoroza(su).
  - This is due to its being derived from a noun-verb compound, 心指す kokoro-za(su).
  - The nominalization removes the okurigana, hence increasing the reading by one mora, yielding 4+1=5.
  - Compare common 話 hanashi 2+1=3, from 話す hana(su).
- 詔 is a triple compound.
  - It has an alternative spelling 御言宣 mi-koto-nori, hence 1+2+2=5.

Further, some Jōyō characters have long non-Jōyō readings (students learn the character, but not the reading), such as omonpakaru for 慮る.

== Kungana ==
Kungana (訓仮名) are a type of Man'yōgana (kanji that are used phonemically and that predate modern kana) that make use of the kana's kun'yomi. For example:

- ya (八) + ma (間) + ato (跡) → Yamato (八間跡; kun'yomi of 大和 'Yamato')
- natsu (夏) + kashi (樫) → natsukashi (夏樫; kun'yomi of 懐かし 'evoking nostalgia')
- na (名) + tsu (津) + ka (蚊) + shi (為) → natsukashi (名津蚊為; kun'yomi of 懐かし 'evoking nostalgia')
- kaki (垣) + tsu (津) + pata (旗) → kakitsubata (垣津旗; kun'yomi of 杜若 'Japanese iris')

== See also ==
- On'yomi
- Kanji
