= Large seal script =

Chinese character forms c. 1050–400 BCE

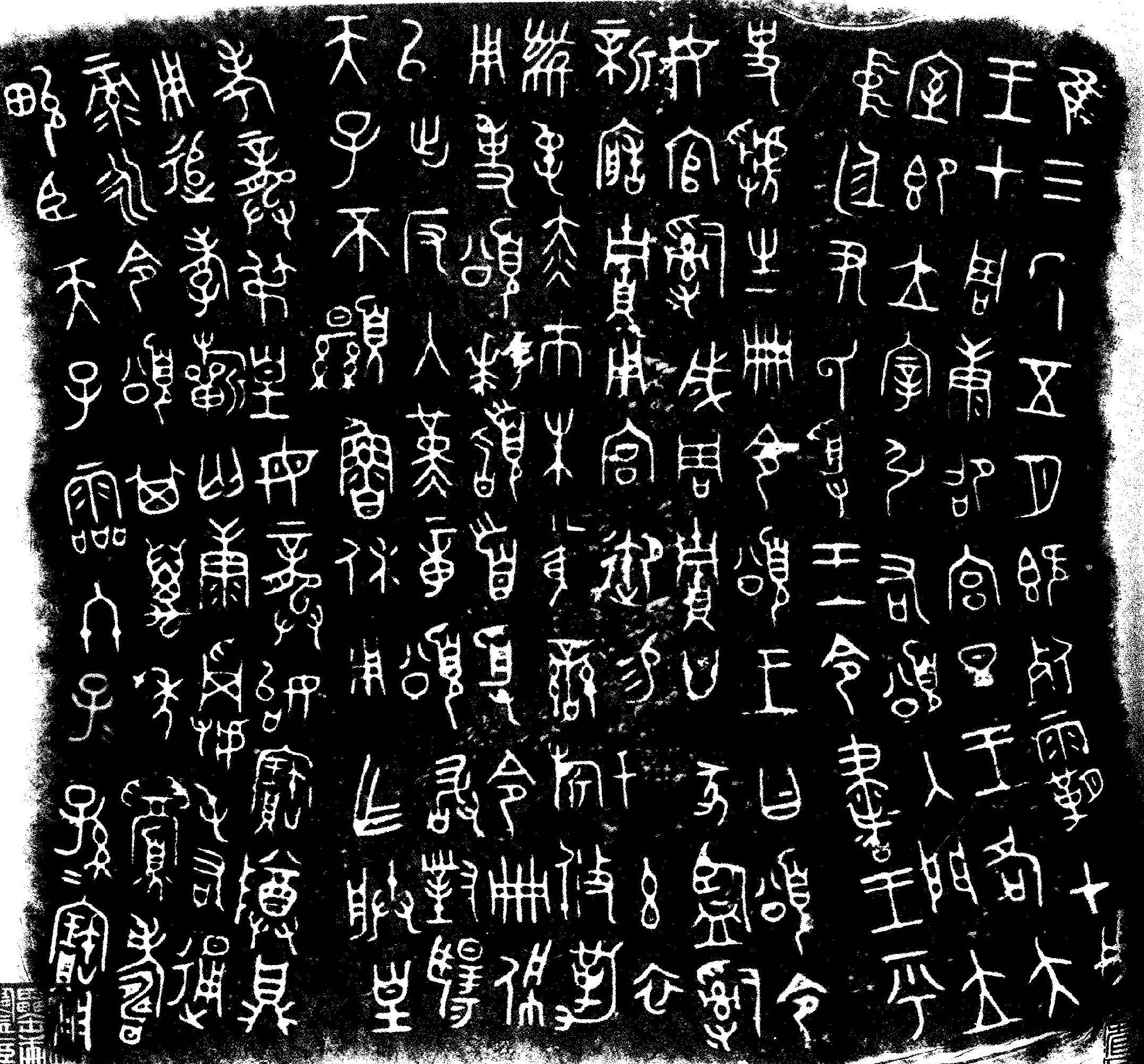
- Script type: Logographic
- Period: Eastern Zhou
- Languages: Old Chinese

Related scripts
- Parent systems: (Proto-writing): Oracle bone script; Bronze script; Large seal script
- Child systems: Small seal script

Large seal script

Chinese name
- Chinese: 大篆
Transcriptions
Standard Mandarin
- Hanyu Pinyin: dàzhuàn
- Bopomofo: ㄉㄚˋ ㄓㄨㄢˋ
- Wade–Giles: ta^{4}-chuan^{4}
- Tongyong Pinyin: dà-jhuàn
- IPA: [tâ.ʈʂwân]

Vietnamese name
- Vietnamese alphabet: Đại triện
- Chữ Hán: 大篆

The term large seal script traditionally refers to written Chinese dating from before the Qin dynasty—now used either narrowly to the writing of the Western and early Eastern Zhou dynasty (c. 1046 – 403 BCE), or more broadly to also include the oracle bone script (c. 1250 – c. 1000 BCE). The term deliberately contrasts the small seal script, the official script standardized throughout China during the Qin dynasty, often called merely 'seal script'. Due to the term's lack of precision, scholars often prefer more specific references regarding the provenance of whichever written samples are being discussed.

During the Han dynasty (202 BCE – 220 CE), when clerical script became the popular form of writing, the small seal script was relegated to limited, formal usage, such as on signet seals and for the titles of stelae (inscribed stone memorial tablets which were popular at the time), and as such the earlier Qin dynasty script began to be referred to as 'seal script'. At that time, there remained knowledge of even older, often more complex glyphs dating to the middle-to-late Zhou dynasty, directly ancestral to the Qin forms—which resembled the Qin forms in their rounded style, as opposed to the rectilinear clerical script style prominent during the Han. As a result, the 'large' and 'small' terms emerged to refer to the respective scripts. The Han-era Shuowen Jiezi dictionary (c. 100 CE) credits sometimes traditionally identified with a group of characters from the Shizhoupian (c. 800 BCE), preserved by their inclusion within the Shuowen Jiezi. Xu Shen, the latter text's author, included the variants differing from the structures of small seal script, and labelled the examples as zhòuwén (籀文), referring to the name of the original book, not the name of the dynasty or of a script

== See also ==
- Seal script
- Small seal script
