= List of radicals in Unicode =

The List of Unicode radicals comprises those Unicode characters that represent radical components of CJK characters, Tangut characters or Yi syllables. These are used primarily for indexing characters in dictionaries.

There are two CJK radicals blocks: the "Kangxi Radicals" block that includes the 214 standard radicals used in the Kangxi Dictionary; and the "CJK Radicals Supplement" block that includes 115 radical components used in other modern dictionaries, including simplified Chinese and Japanese radicals forms.

There is one "Tangut Components" block that includes 768 radicals and components that are used to index Tangut characters in dictionaries of the Tangut script or to describe the structure of Tangut characters.

There is one "Yi Radicals" block that includes 55 radicals used to index Yi characters in dictionaries of the standardized Yi script used for writing the Nuosu language in Southern Sichuan and Northern Yunnan.

Sets of radicals for other sinoform scripts, such as Jurchen, have also been proposed for encoding in Unicode.

== Unicode tables ==
Kangxi Radicals^{[1]}^{[2]} Official Unicode Consortium code chart (PDF)
	0	1	2	3	4	5	6	7	8	9	A	B	C	D	E	F
U+2F0x	⼀	⼁	⼂	⼃	⼄	⼅	⼆	⼇	⼈	⼉	⼊	⼋	⼌	⼍	⼎	⼏
U+2F1x	⼐	⼑	⼒	⼓	⼔	⼕	⼖	⼗	⼘	⼙	⼚	⼛	⼜	⼝	⼞	⼟
U+2F2x	⼠	⼡	⼢	⼣	⼤	⼥	⼦	⼧	⼨	⼩	⼪	⼫	⼬	⼭	⼮	⼯
U+2F3x	⼰	⼱	⼲	⼳	⼴	⼵	⼶	⼷	⼸	⼹	⼺	⼻	⼼	⼽	⼾	⼿
U+2F4x	⽀	⽁	⽂	⽃	⽄	⽅	⽆	⽇	⽈	⽉	⽊	⽋	⽌	⽍	⽎	⽏
U+2F5x	⽐	⽑	⽒	⽓	⽔	⽕	⽖	⽗	⽘	⽙	⽚	⽛	⽜	⽝	⽞	⽟
U+2F6x	⽠	⽡	⽢	⽣	⽤	⽥	⽦	⽧	⽨	⽩	⽪	⽫	⽬	⽭	⽮	⽯
U+2F7x	⽰	⽱	⽲	⽳	⽴	⽵	⽶	⽷	⽸	⽹	⽺	⽻	⽼	⽽	⽾	⽿
U+2F8x	⾀	⾁	⾂	⾃	⾄	⾅	⾆	⾇	⾈	⾉	⾊	⾋	⾌	⾍	⾎	⾏
U+2F9x	⾐	⾑	⾒	⾓	⾔	⾕	⾖	⾗	⾘	⾙	⾚	⾛	⾜	⾝	⾞	⾟
U+2FAx	⾠	⾡	⾢	⾣	⾤	⾥	⾦	⾧	⾨	⾩	⾪	⾫	⾬	⾭	⾮	⾯
U+2FBx	⾰	⾱	⾲	⾳	⾴	⾵	⾶	⾷	⾸	⾹	⾺	⾻	⾼	⾽	⾾	⾿
U+2FCx	⿀	⿁	⿂	⿃	⿄	⿅	⿆	⿇	⿈	⿉	⿊	⿋	⿌	⿍	⿎	⿏
U+2FDx	⿐	⿑	⿒	⿓	⿔	⿕										
Notes: 1. As of Unicode version 17.0; 2. Grey areas indicate non-assigned code points

CJK Radicals Supplement^{[1]}^{[2]} Official Unicode Consortium code chart (PDF)
	0	1	2	3	4	5	6	7	8	9	A	B	C	D	E	F
U+2E8x	⺀	⺁	⺂	⺃	⺄	⺅	⺆	⺇	⺈	⺉	⺊	⺋	⺌	⺍	⺎	⺏
U+2E9x	⺐	⺑	⺒	⺓	⺔	⺕	⺖	⺗	⺘	⺙		⺛	⺜	⺝	⺞	⺟
U+2EAx	⺠	⺡	⺢	⺣	⺤	⺥	⺦	⺧	⺨	⺩	⺪	⺫	⺬	⺭	⺮	⺯
U+2EBx	⺰	⺱	⺲	⺳	⺴	⺵	⺶	⺷	⺸	⺹	⺺	⺻	⺼	⺽	⺾	⺿
U+2ECx	⻀	⻁	⻂	⻃	⻄	⻅	⻆	⻇	⻈	⻉	⻊	⻋	⻌	⻍	⻎	⻏
U+2EDx	⻐	⻑	⻒	⻓	⻔	⻕	⻖	⻗	⻘	⻙	⻚	⻛	⻜	⻝	⻞	⻟
U+2EEx	⻠	⻡	⻢	⻣	⻤	⻥	⻦	⻧	⻨	⻩	⻪	⻫	⻬	⻭	⻮	⻯
U+2EFx	⻰	⻱	⻲	⻳												
Notes: 1. As of Unicode version 17.0; 2. Grey areas indicate non-assigned code points

Tangut Components^{[1]} Official Unicode Consortium code chart (PDF)
	0	1	2	3	4	5	6	7	8	9	A	B	C	D	E	F
U+1880x	𘠀	𘠁	𘠂	𘠃	𘠄	𘠅	𘠆	𘠇	𘠈	𘠉	𘠊	𘠋	𘠌	𘠍	𘠎	𘠏
U+1881x	𘠐	𘠑	𘠒	𘠓	𘠔	𘠕	𘠖	𘠗	𘠘	𘠙	𘠚	𘠛	𘠜	𘠝	𘠞	𘠟
U+1882x	𘠠	𘠡	𘠢	𘠣	𘠤	𘠥	𘠦	𘠧	𘠨	𘠩	𘠪	𘠫	𘠬	𘠭	𘠮	𘠯
U+1883x	𘠰	𘠱	𘠲	𘠳	𘠴	𘠵	𘠶	𘠷	𘠸	𘠹	𘠺	𘠻	𘠼	𘠽	𘠾	𘠿
U+1884x	𘡀	𘡁	𘡂	𘡃	𘡄	𘡅	𘡆	𘡇	𘡈	𘡉	𘡊	𘡋	𘡌	𘡍	𘡎	𘡏
U+1885x	𘡐	𘡑	𘡒	𘡓	𘡔	𘡕	𘡖	𘡗	𘡘	𘡙	𘡚	𘡛	𘡜	𘡝	𘡞	𘡟
U+1886x	𘡠	𘡡	𘡢	𘡣	𘡤	𘡥	𘡦	𘡧	𘡨	𘡩	𘡪	𘡫	𘡬	𘡭	𘡮	𘡯
U+1887x	𘡰	𘡱	𘡲	𘡳	𘡴	𘡵	𘡶	𘡷	𘡸	𘡹	𘡺	𘡻	𘡼	𘡽	𘡾	𘡿
U+1888x	𘢀	𘢁	𘢂	𘢃	𘢄	𘢅	𘢆	𘢇	𘢈	𘢉	𘢊	𘢋	𘢌	𘢍	𘢎	𘢏
U+1889x	𘢐	𘢑	𘢒	𘢓	𘢔	𘢕	𘢖	𘢗	𘢘	𘢙	𘢚	𘢛	𘢜	𘢝	𘢞	𘢟
U+188Ax	𘢠	𘢡	𘢢	𘢣	𘢤	𘢥	𘢦	𘢧	𘢨	𘢩	𘢪	𘢫	𘢬	𘢭	𘢮	𘢯
U+188Bx	𘢰	𘢱	𘢲	𘢳	𘢴	𘢵	𘢶	𘢷	𘢸	𘢹	𘢺	𘢻	𘢼	𘢽	𘢾	𘢿
U+188Cx	𘣀	𘣁	𘣂	𘣃	𘣄	𘣅	𘣆	𘣇	𘣈	𘣉	𘣊	𘣋	𘣌	𘣍	𘣎	𘣏
U+188Dx	𘣐	𘣑	𘣒	𘣓	𘣔	𘣕	𘣖	𘣗	𘣘	𘣙	𘣚	𘣛	𘣜	𘣝	𘣞	𘣟
U+188Ex	𘣠	𘣡	𘣢	𘣣	𘣤	𘣥	𘣦	𘣧	𘣨	𘣩	𘣪	𘣫	𘣬	𘣭	𘣮	𘣯
U+188Fx	𘣰	𘣱	𘣲	𘣳	𘣴	𘣵	𘣶	𘣷	𘣸	𘣹	𘣺	𘣻	𘣼	𘣽	𘣾	𘣿
U+1890x	𘤀	𘤁	𘤂	𘤃	𘤄	𘤅	𘤆	𘤇	𘤈	𘤉	𘤊	𘤋	𘤌	𘤍	𘤎	𘤏
U+1891x	𘤐	𘤑	𘤒	𘤓	𘤔	𘤕	𘤖	𘤗	𘤘	𘤙	𘤚	𘤛	𘤜	𘤝	𘤞	𘤟
U+1892x	𘤠	𘤡	𘤢	𘤣	𘤤	𘤥	𘤦	𘤧	𘤨	𘤩	𘤪	𘤫	𘤬	𘤭	𘤮	𘤯
U+1893x	𘤰	𘤱	𘤲	𘤳	𘤴	𘤵	𘤶	𘤷	𘤸	𘤹	𘤺	𘤻	𘤼	𘤽	𘤾	𘤿
U+1894x	𘥀	𘥁	𘥂	𘥃	𘥄	𘥅	𘥆	𘥇	𘥈	𘥉	𘥊	𘥋	𘥌	𘥍	𘥎	𘥏
U+1895x	𘥐	𘥑	𘥒	𘥓	𘥔	𘥕	𘥖	𘥗	𘥘	𘥙	𘥚	𘥛	𘥜	𘥝	𘥞	𘥟
U+1896x	𘥠	𘥡	𘥢	𘥣	𘥤	𘥥	𘥦	𘥧	𘥨	𘥩	𘥪	𘥫	𘥬	𘥭	𘥮	𘥯
U+1897x	𘥰	𘥱	𘥲	𘥳	𘥴	𘥵	𘥶	𘥷	𘥸	𘥹	𘥺	𘥻	𘥼	𘥽	𘥾	𘥿
U+1898x	𘦀	𘦁	𘦂	𘦃	𘦄	𘦅	𘦆	𘦇	𘦈	𘦉	𘦊	𘦋	𘦌	𘦍	𘦎	𘦏
U+1899x	𘦐	𘦑	𘦒	𘦓	𘦔	𘦕	𘦖	𘦗	𘦘	𘦙	𘦚	𘦛	𘦜	𘦝	𘦞	𘦟
U+189Ax	𘦠	𘦡	𘦢	𘦣	𘦤	𘦥	𘦦	𘦧	𘦨	𘦩	𘦪	𘦫	𘦬	𘦭	𘦮	𘦯
U+189Bx	𘦰	𘦱	𘦲	𘦳	𘦴	𘦵	𘦶	𘦷	𘦸	𘦹	𘦺	𘦻	𘦼	𘦽	𘦾	𘦿
U+189Cx	𘧀	𘧁	𘧂	𘧃	𘧄	𘧅	𘧆	𘧇	𘧈	𘧉	𘧊	𘧋	𘧌	𘧍	𘧎	𘧏
U+189Dx	𘧐	𘧑	𘧒	𘧓	𘧔	𘧕	𘧖	𘧗	𘧘	𘧙	𘧚	𘧛	𘧜	𘧝	𘧞	𘧟
U+189Ex	𘧠	𘧡	𘧢	𘧣	𘧤	𘧥	𘧦	𘧧	𘧨	𘧩	𘧪	𘧫	𘧬	𘧭	𘧮	𘧯
U+189Fx	𘧰	𘧱	𘧲	𘧳	𘧴	𘧵	𘧶	𘧷	𘧸	𘧹	𘧺	𘧻	𘧼	𘧽	𘧾	𘧿
U+18A0x	𘨀	𘨁	𘨂	𘨃	𘨄	𘨅	𘨆	𘨇	𘨈	𘨉	𘨊	𘨋	𘨌	𘨍	𘨎	𘨏
U+18A1x	𘨐	𘨑	𘨒	𘨓	𘨔	𘨕	𘨖	𘨗	𘨘	𘨙	𘨚	𘨛	𘨜	𘨝	𘨞	𘨟
U+18A2x	𘨠	𘨡	𘨢	𘨣	𘨤	𘨥	𘨦	𘨧	𘨨	𘨩	𘨪	𘨫	𘨬	𘨭	𘨮	𘨯
U+18A3x	𘨰	𘨱	𘨲	𘨳	𘨴	𘨵	𘨶	𘨷	𘨸	𘨹	𘨺	𘨻	𘨼	𘨽	𘨾	𘨿
U+18A4x	𘩀	𘩁	𘩂	𘩃	𘩄	𘩅	𘩆	𘩇	𘩈	𘩉	𘩊	𘩋	𘩌	𘩍	𘩎	𘩏
U+18A5x	𘩐	𘩑	𘩒	𘩓	𘩔	𘩕	𘩖	𘩗	𘩘	𘩙	𘩚	𘩛	𘩜	𘩝	𘩞	𘩟
U+18A6x	𘩠	𘩡	𘩢	𘩣	𘩤	𘩥	𘩦	𘩧	𘩨	𘩩	𘩪	𘩫	𘩬	𘩭	𘩮	𘩯
U+18A7x	𘩰	𘩱	𘩲	𘩳	𘩴	𘩵	𘩶	𘩷	𘩸	𘩹	𘩺	𘩻	𘩼	𘩽	𘩾	𘩿
U+18A8x	𘪀	𘪁	𘪂	𘪃	𘪄	𘪅	𘪆	𘪇	𘪈	𘪉	𘪊	𘪋	𘪌	𘪍	𘪎	𘪏
U+18A9x	𘪐	𘪑	𘪒	𘪓	𘪔	𘪕	𘪖	𘪗	𘪘	𘪙	𘪚	𘪛	𘪜	𘪝	𘪞	𘪟
U+18AAx	𘪠	𘪡	𘪢	𘪣	𘪤	𘪥	𘪦	𘪧	𘪨	𘪩	𘪪	𘪫	𘪬	𘪭	𘪮	𘪯
U+18ABx	𘪰	𘪱	𘪲	𘪳	𘪴	𘪵	𘪶	𘪷	𘪸	𘪹	𘪺	𘪻	𘪼	𘪽	𘪾	𘪿
U+18ACx	𘫀	𘫁	𘫂	𘫃	𘫄	𘫅	𘫆	𘫇	𘫈	𘫉	𘫊	𘫋	𘫌	𘫍	𘫎	𘫏
U+18ADx	𘫐	𘫑	𘫒	𘫓	𘫔	𘫕	𘫖	𘫗	𘫘	𘫙	𘫚	𘫛	𘫜	𘫝	𘫞	𘫟
U+18AEx	𘫠	𘫡	𘫢	𘫣	𘫤	𘫥	𘫦	𘫧	𘫨	𘫩	𘫪	𘫫	𘫬	𘫭	𘫮	𘫯
U+18AFx	𘫰	𘫱	𘫲	𘫳	𘫴	𘫵	𘫶	𘫷	𘫸	𘫹	𘫺	𘫻	𘫼	𘫽	𘫾	𘫿
Notes: 1. As of Unicode version 17.0

Tangut Components Supplement^{[1]}^{[2]} Official Unicode Consortium code chart (PDF)
	0	1	2	3	4	5	6	7	8	9	A	B	C	D	E	F
U+18D8x	𘶀	𘶁	𘶂	𘶃	𘶄	𘶅	𘶆	𘶇	𘶈	𘶉	𘶊	𘶋	𘶌	𘶍	𘶎	𘶏
U+18D9x	𘶐	𘶑	𘶒	𘶓	𘶔	𘶕	𘶖	𘶗	𘶘	𘶙	𘶚	𘶛	𘶜	𘶝	𘶞	𘶟
U+18DAx	𘶠	𘶡	𘶢	𘶣	𘶤	𘶥	𘶦	𘶧	𘶨	𘶩	𘶪	𘶫	𘶬	𘶭	𘶮	𘶯
U+18DBx	𘶰	𘶱	𘶲	𘶳	𘶴	𘶵	𘶶	𘶷	𘶸	𘶹	𘶺	𘶻	𘶼	𘶽	𘶾	𘶿
U+18DCx	𘷀	𘷁	𘷂	𘷃	𘷄	𘷅	𘷆	𘷇	𘷈	𘷉	𘷊	𘷋	𘷌	𘷍	𘷎	𘷏
U+18DDx	𘷐	𘷑	𘷒	𘷓	𘷔	𘷕	𘷖	𘷗	𘷘	𘷙	𘷚	𘷛	𘷜	𘷝	𘷞	𘷟
U+18DEx	𘷠	𘷡	𘷢	𘷣	𘷤	𘷥	𘷦	𘷧	𘷨	𘷩	𘷪	𘷫	𘷬	𘷭	𘷮	𘷯
U+18DFx	𘷰	𘷱	𘷲													
Notes: 1. As of Unicode version 17.0; 2. Grey areas indicate non-assigned code points

Yi Radicals^{[1]}^{[2]} Official Unicode Consortium code chart (PDF)
	0	1	2	3	4	5	6	7	8	9	A	B	C	D	E	F
U+A49x	꒐	꒑	꒒	꒓	꒔	꒕	꒖	꒗	꒘	꒙	꒚	꒛	꒜	꒝	꒞	꒟
U+A4Ax	꒠	꒡	꒢	꒣	꒤	꒥	꒦	꒧	꒨	꒩	꒪	꒫	꒬	꒭	꒮	꒯
U+A4Bx	꒰	꒱	꒲	꒳	꒴	꒵	꒶	꒷	꒸	꒹	꒺	꒻	꒼	꒽	꒾	꒿
U+A4Cx	꓀	꓁	꓂	꓃	꓄	꓅	꓆									
Notes: 1. As of Unicode version 17.0; 2. Grey areas indicate non-assigned code points

== See also ==
- Section headers of a Chinese dictionary
- List of Shuowen Jiezi radicals, a system of 540 components used by Xu Shen (d. ~147AD) in his Shuowen Jiezi
- List of Kangxi radicals, a system of 214 components used by the Kangxi dictionary (1716), made under the leadership of the Kangxi Emperor
- List of Xinhua Zidian radicals
- Chinese characters description languages, computer and SVG based descriptions of CJK characters
