= Radical 140 =

Chinese character radical

艸
- Radical 140 (U+2F8B)
- 艸 (U+8278) "grass"

Pronunciations
- Pinyin: cǎo
- Bopomofo: ㄘㄠˇ
- Gwoyeu Romatzyh: tsao
- Wade–Giles: tsʻao^{3}
- Cantonese Yale: chóu
- Jyutping: cou2
- Japanese Kana: ソウ sō (on'yomi) くさ kusa (kun'yomi)
- Sino-Korean: 초 cho
- Hán-Việt: thảo

Names
- Chinese name(s): (艹) 草字頭/草字头 cǎozìtóu
- Japanese name(s): 草/くさ kusa (艹) 草冠/くさかんむり kusakanmuri
- Hangul: 풀 pul

Stroke order animation

Radical 140 or radical grass (艸部) meaning "grass" is one of 29 of the 214 Kangxi radicals that are composed of 6 strokes. It transforms into 艹 when appearing at the top of a character or component. In the Kangxi Dictionary and in modern standard Traditional Chinese as used in Taiwan, Hong Kong and Macau, 艹 (with two horizontal strokes) consists of four strokes, while in Simplified Chinese and modern Japanese, 艹 (with a continuous horizontal stroke) consists of three strokes.

In the Kangxi Dictionary there are 1902 characters (out of 40,000) found under this radical, making it the most commonly used radical.

艹, the upper component form of 艸, is the 30th indexing component in the Table of Indexing Chinese Character Components predominantly adopted by Simplified Chinese dictionaries published in mainland China, while 艸 is listed as its associated indexing component.

== Evolution ==
Small seal script character

== Derived characters ==
Strokes	Characters
+0	艸 (=草) 艹
+1	艺^{SC} (=藝)
+2	艻 艼 艽 艾 艿 芀 (=苕) 芁 (=𦫶) 节^{SC} (=節 -> 竹)
+3	芃 芄 芅 芆 芇 芈^{SC} (=羋 -> 羊) 芉 芊 芋 芌 (=芋) 芍 芎 芏 芐 芑 芒 芓 芔 (=卉 -> 十) 芕 (=芍) 芖 芗^{SC} (=薌)
+4	芘 芙 芚 芛 芜^{SC} (=蕪) 芝 芞 芟 芠 芡 芢 芣 芤 芥 芦^{SC} (=蘆) 芧 芨 芩 芪 芫 芬 芭 芮 芯 芰 花 芲 (=花 菕 蒼) 芳 芴 芵 芶 芷 芸 (also JP form of 藝) 芹 芺 芻 芼 芽 芾 苀 苁^{SC} (=蓯) 苂 苃 苄 苅 (=刈 -> 刀) 苆 苇^{SC} (=葦) 苈^{SC} (=藶) 苉 苊 苋^{SC} (=莧) 苌^{SC} (=萇) 苍^{SC} (=蒼) 苎^{SC} (=苧) 苏^{SC} (=蘇) 茾
+5	芿 苐 苑 苒 苓 苔 苕 苖 苗 苘 (=檾 -> 木) 苙 苚 苛 苜 苝 苞 苟 苠 苡 苢 (=苡) 苣 苤 若 苦 苧 (also SC form of 薴) 苨 苩 苪 苫 苬 苭 苮 苯 苰 英 苲 苳 苴 苵 苶 苷 苸 苹^{SC} (=蘋) 苺 (=莓) 苻 苼 苽 (=菰 / 瓜 -> 瓜) 苾 苿 茀 茁 茂 范^{SC} (=範 -> 竹) 茄 茅 茆 茇 茈 茉 茊 茋 茌 茍 茎^{SC} (=莖) 茏^{SC} (=蘢) 茐 (=蔥) 茑^{SC} (=蔦) 茓 茔^{SC} (=塋 -> 土) 茕^{SC} (=煢 -> 火)
+6	茒 茖 茗 茘 (=荔) 茙 茚 茛 茜 茞 茟 茠 (=薅) 茡 茢 茤 茥 茦 茧^{SC/JP} (=繭 -> 糸) 茨 茩 茪 茫 茬 茭 茮 茯 茰 茱 茲 茳 茴 茵 茶 茷 茸 茹 茺 茻 茼 茽 茿 荀 荁 荂 荃 荄 荅 荆^{SC} (=荊) 荇 荈 草 荊 荋 荌 荍 荎 荏 荐^{SC} (=薦) 荑 荒 荔 荕 荖 荗 荘^{JP} (=莊) 荙^{SC} (=薘) 荚^{SC} (=莢) 荛^{SC} (=蕘) 荜^{SC} (=蓽) 荝 (=萴) 荞^{SC} (=蕎) 荟^{SC} (=薈) 荠^{SC} (=薺) 荡^{SC} (=蕩) 荢 (=茡) 荣^{SC} (=榮 -> 木) 荤^{SC} (=葷) 荥^{SC} (=滎 -> 水) 荦^{SC} (=犖 -> 牛) 荧^{SC} (=熒 -> 火) 荨^{SC} (=蕁) 荩^{SC} (=藎) 荪^{SC} (=蓀) 荫^{SC} (=蔭) 荬^{SC} (=蕒) 荭^{SC} (=葒) 荮^{SC} (=葤) 药^{SC} (=藥)
+7	茝 茣 荰 荱 荲 荳 (=豆 -> 豆) 荴 荵 荶 荷 荸 荹 荺 荻 荼 荽 荾 荿 莀 莁 莂 莃 莄 莅^{SC} (=蒞) 莆 莇 莈 莉 莊 莋 莌 莍 莎 莏 莐 莑 莒 莓 莔 莕 莖 莗 莘 莙 莚 莛 莜 莝 莞 莟 莠 莡 莢 莣 莤 莥 莦 莧 莨 莩 莪 莫 莬 莮 莯 莰 莱^{SC} (=萊) 莲^{SC} (=蓮) 莳^{SC} (=蒔) 莴^{SC} (=萵) 莵 (=菟) 莶^{SC} (=薟) 获^{SC} (=獲 -> 犬 / 穫 -> 禾) 莸^{SC} (=蕕) 莹^{SC} (=瑩 -> 玉) 莺^{SC} (=鶯 -> 鳥) 莻 莼^{SC} (=蓴) 莽
+8	荓 莾 (=莽) 莿 菀 菁 菂 菃 菄 菅 菆 菇 菈 菉 菊 菋 菌 菍 菎 菏 菐 菑 菒 菓 (=果 -> 木) 菔 菕 菖 菗 菘 菙 菚 菛 菜 菝 菞 菟 菠 菡 菢 菣 菤 菥 菦 (=芹) 菧 菨 菩 菪 菫 (=蓳) 菬 菭 菮 華 菰 菱 菲 菳 菴 菵 菶 菷 (=帚 -> 巾) 菸 菹 菺 菻 菼 菽 菾 菿 萀 萁 萂 萃 萄 萅 (=春 -> 日) 萆 萇 萈 萉 萊 萋 萌 萍 萎 萏 萐 萑 萒 萓 萔 (=苕) 萕^{JP nonstandard} (=薺) 萖 (=莞) 萗 萘 萙 萚^{SC} (=蘀) 萛 萜 萝^{SC} (=蘿) 萞 萟 萠 萡 萢 萣 萤^{SC} (=螢 -> 虫) 营^{SC} (=營 -> 火) 萦^{SC} (=縈 -> 糸) 萧^{SC} (=蕭) 萨^{SC} (=薩) 著
+9	莭 萩 萪 萫 萭 萮 萯 萰 萱 萲 (=萱) 萳 萴 萵 萶 萷 (=梢 -> 木) 萸 萹 萺 萻 萼 落 萾 萿 葀 葁 (=薑) 葂 葃 葄 葅 (=菹) 葆 葇 葈 葉 葊 葋 葌 葍 葎 葏 葐 葑 葒 葓 葔 葕 葖 葘 (=菑) 葙 葚 葛 葜 葝 葞 葟 葠 (=蔘) 葡 葢 (=蓋) 董 葤 葥 葦 葧 葨 葩 葪 葫 葬 葭 葮 葯 葰 葱^{SC} (=蔥) 葲 葳 葴 葵 葶 葷 葸 葹 葺 葻 葼 葽 葾 葿 蒀 蒁 蒂 蒃 蒄 蒅 蒆 蒇^{SC} (=蕆) 蒈 蒉^{SC} (=蕢) 蒊 蒋^{SC} (=蔣) 蒌^{SC} (=蔞) 蒍 蒎 蒏 (=醟 -> 酉)
+10	蒋^{JP} (=蔣) 蒐 蒑 蒒 蒓 蒔 蒕 (=蒀) 蒖 蒗 蒘 蒙 蒚 蒛 蒜 蒝 蒞 蒟 蒠 蒡 蒢 蒣 蒤 蒥 蒦 蒧 蒨 蒩 蒪 蒫 蒬 蒭 (=芻) 蒮 蒯 蒰 蒱 蒲 蒳 蒴 蒵 蒶 蒷 蒹 蒺 蒻 蒼 蒽 蒾 蒿 蓀 蓁 蓂 蓃 蓄 蓅 蓆 蓇 蓈 蓉 蓊 蓋 蓌 蓍 蓎 蓏 蓐 蓑 蓒 蓓 蓔 蓕 蓖 蓗 蓘 蓙 蓚 蓛 蓜 蓝^{SC} (=藍) 蓞 (=萏) 蓟^{SC} (=薊) 蓠^{SC} (=蘺) 蓡 (=參 -> 厶) 蓢 蓣^{SC} (=蕷) 蓤 蓦^{SC} (=驀 -> 馬)
+11	蓥^{SC} (=鎣 -> 金) 蓧 蓨 蓩 蓪 蓫 蓬 蓭 (=庵 -> 广) 蓮 蓯 蓰 蓱 蓲 蓳 蓴 蓵 蓶 蓷 蓸 蓹 蓺 蓻 蓼 蓽 蓾 蓿 蔀 蔁 蔂 (=虆) 蔃 蔄 蔅 蔆 (=菱) 蔇 蔈 蔉 蔊 蔋 蔌 蔍 蔎 蔏 蔐 蔑 蔒 (=葷) 蔓 蔔 蔕 (=蒂) 蔖 蔗 蔘 蔙 蔚 蔛 蔜 蔝 蔞 蔟 蔠 蔡 蔢 蔣 蔤 蔥 蔦 蔧 蔨 蔩 蔪 蔫 蔬 蔭 蔮 蔯 蔰 蔱 (=樧 -> 木) 蔲 蔳 蔴 (=麻 -> 麻) 蔵^{JP} (=藏) 蔶 蔷^{SC} (=薔) 蔸 蔹^{SC} (=蘞) 蔺^{SC} (=藺) 蔻 蔼^{SC} (=藹)
+12	蔽 蔾 (=藜) 蔿 (=蒍) 蕀 蕁 蕂 蕃 蕄 蕅 蕆 蕇 蕈 蕉 蕊 蕋 (=蕊) 蕌 (=藟) 蕍 蕎 蕏 蕐 蕑 蕒 蕓 蕔 蕕 蕖 蕗 蕘 蕙 蕚 (=萼) 蕛 蕜 蕝 蕞 蕟 蕠 蕡 蕢 蕣 蕤 蕥 蕦 蕧 蕨 蕩 蕪 蕫 蕬 蕭 蕮 蕯 蕰^{SC} (=薀) 蕱 蕲^{SC} (=蘄) 蕳 蕴^{SC} (=蘊) 蕵 (=薞)
+13	蕶 蕷 蕸 蕹 蕺 蕻 蕼 蕽 蕾 蕿 (=萱) 薀 薁 薂 薃 薄 薅 薆 薇 薈 薉 薊 薋 薌 薍 薎 薏 薐 薑 薒 薓 薔 薕 薖 薗 (=園 -> 囗) 薘 薙 薚 薛 薜 薝 薞 薟 薠 薡 薢 薣 薤 薥 薦 薧 薨 薪 薫^{JP} (=薰) 薬^{JP} (=藥) 薮^{SC/JP} (=藪)
+14	薩 薭 薯 薰 薱 薲 (=蘋) 薳 薴 薵 薶 薷 薸 薹 薺 薻 薼 薽 薾 薿 藀 藁 藂 藃 藄 藅 藆 藇 藈 藉 藊 藋 藌 藍 藎 藏 藐 藑 藒 藓^{SC} (=蘚) 蘤 (=花)
+15	藔 藕 藖 藗 藘 藙 藚 藛 藜 藝 藞 藟 藠 藡 (=荻) 藢 藣 藤 藥 藦 藧 藨 藩 藪 藫 藬 藭 藯 藰 藱 藲 (=櫙 -> 木) 藳 藴 (=蘊) 藵
+16	藮 (=樵 -> 木) 藶 藷 藸 藹 藺 藻 藼 (=萱) 藽 藾 藿 蘀 蘁 蘂 (=蕊) 蘃 蘄 蘅 蘆 蘇 蘈 蘉 蘊 蘋 蘌 (=篽 -> 竹) 蘍 (=薰) 蘎 蘏 蘐 (=萱) 蘑 蘓 (=蘇) 蘔 蘢
+17	蘒^{JP} 蘕 蘖 (=櫱 -> 木) 蘗 蘘 蘙 蘚 蘛 蘜 (=菊) 蘝 (=蘞) 蘞 蘟 蘠 蘡 蘣 蘥 蘦 蘧 蘨 蘩 蘪 蘫 蘬 蘭 蘮 蘯 (=蕩) 蘰
+18	蘲 (=虆) 蘳 蘴 (=葑) 蘵 蘶 蘷 (=夔 -> 夊)
+19	蘱 蘸 蘹 蘺 蘻 蘼 蘽 蘾 蘿 虀 虁 (=夔 -> 夊)
+20	虂 虃 虄 虅
+21	虆 虇 虈 虉
+23	虊
+25	虋 虌

== Variant forms ==
This radical character is written differently in different languages. Traditionally, breaking the horizontal stroke in 艹 is optional in both printing and written forms. The Kangxi Dictionary adopted the four-stroke form ⺿.

In today's Simplified Chinese, only the three-stroke form 艹 is used; The four-stroke form ⺿ is treated as an obsolete typeface form after the adoption of xin zixing. In modern Traditional Chinese as used in Taiwan, Hong Kong, and Macau, the four-stroke form ⺿ is standard, while the three-stroke form is still overwhelmingly preferred in publications.

In Japanese, only the three-stroke form is used for jōyō kanji (commonly used Chinese characters); the three-stroke form is recommended for hyōgai kanji, while the four-stroke form is listed as an acceptable "design difference" in Hyōgai Kanji Jitaihyō (表外漢字字体表) and JIS X 0208.

In addition, 䒑 is derived from the cursive form of 艹.

Standard stroke order in Taiwan Chinese

Stroke order in Simplified Chinese and Japanese
