= Radical 112 =

Chinese character radical

石
- Radical 112 (U+2F6F)
- 石 (U+77F3) "stone"

Pronunciations
- Pinyin: shí
- Bopomofo: ㄕˊ
- Gwoyeu Romatzyh: shyr
- Wade–Giles: shih^{2}
- Cantonese Yale: sehk
- Jyutping: sek6
- Japanese Kana: セキ seki / シャク shaku / コク koku (on'yomi) いし ishi (kun'yomi)
- Sino-Korean: 석 seok

Names
- Chinese name(s): (Left) 石字旁 shízìpáng (Bottom) 石字底 shízìdǐ
- Japanese name(s): 石/いし ishi (Left) 石偏/いしへん ishihen
- Hangul: 돌 dol

Stroke order animation

Radical 112 or radical stone (石部) meaning "stone" (石头) is one of the 23 Kangxi radicals (214 radicals in total) composed of 5 strokes.

In the Kangxi Dictionary, there are 499 characters (out of 49,030) to be found under this radical.

石 is also the 102nd indexing component in the Table of Indexing Chinese Character Components predominantly adopted by Simplified Chinese dictionaries published in mainland China.

In Chinese names for chemical elements, radical 石 means that this element is solid non-metal at room temperature and standard pressure.

== Evolution ==
A stone (口) beneath a cliff (厂);

Oracle bone script character

Bronze script character

Chu slip and silk script

Large seal script character

Small seal script character

== Derived characters ==
Strokes	Characters
+0	石
+2	矴 (=碇) 矵 矶^{SC} (=磯)
+3	矷 矸 矹 矺 矻 矼 矽 矾^{SC} (=礬) 矿^{SC} (=礦) 砀^{SC} (=碭) 码^{SC} (=碼)
+4	泵 砂 砃 砄 砅 砆 砇 (=珉 -> 玉) 砈 砉 砊 砋 砌 砍 砎 砏 砐 砑 砒 砓 研 砕^{JP} (=碎) 砖^{SC} (=磚) 砗^{SC} (=硨) 砘 砙 砚^{SC} (=硯) 砛 砜^{SC} (=碸)
+5	砝 砞 砟 砠 砡 砢 砣 砤 砥 砦 砧 砨 砩 砪 砫 砬 砭 砮 砯 砰 砱 砲^{TC variant/JP} -> 火 (=炮) 砳 破 砵 砶 砷 砸 砹 砺^{SC} (=礪) 砻^{SC} (=礱) 砼 砽 砾^{SC} (=礫) 砿^{JP nonstandard} (=礦) 础^{SC} (=礎) 硁^{SC} (=硜)
+6	硂 硃 硄 硅 硆 硇 硈 硉 硊 硋 硌 硍 硎 硏 (=研 硯) 硐 硑 (=砰 / 瓶 -> 瓦 研) 硒 硓 硔 硕^{SC} (=碩) 硖^{SC} (=硤) 硗^{SC} (=磽) 硘 硙^{SC} (=磑) 硚^{SC} (=礄) 硛
+7	硜 硝 硞 硟 硠 硡 硢 硣 硤 硥 硦 硧 硨 硩 硪 硫 硬 硭 确 (also SC form of 確) 硯 硰 硱 硲 硳 硴 硵^{SC} (=磠) 硶 硷^{SC (obsolete)} (=鹼)
+8	硸 硹 硺 硻 硼 硽 硿 碀 碁 (=棋 -> 木) 碂 碃 碄 碅 碆 碇 碈 碉 碊 碋 碌 碍^{SC} (=礙) 碎 碏 碐 碑 碒 碓 碔 碕 碖 碗 碘 碙 碚 碛^{SC} (=磧) 碜^{SC} (=磣) 碰
+9	硾 碝 碞 碟 碠 碡 碢 碣 碤 碥 碦 碧 碨 碩 碪 碫 碬 碭 碮 碯 (=瑙 -> 玉) 碱^{SC} (=鹼) 碲 碳 碴 碵 碶 碷 碸 碹 磁
+10	確 碻 碼 碽 碾 碿 磀 磂 (=硫 / 鎦 -> 金) 磃 磄 磅 磆 磇 磈 磉 磊 磋 磌 磍 磎 (=谿 -> 谷) 磏 磐 磑 磒 (=隕 -> 阜) 磓 磔 磕 磖 磗 磘 磙 磜 磤
+11	磚 磛 磝 磞 磟 磠 磡 磢 磣 磥 磦 磧 磨 磩 磪 磫 磬 磭 磮
+12	磯 磰 磱 磲 磳 磴 磵 磶 磷 磸 磹 磺 磻 磼 磽 磾 磿 礀 礁 礂 礃 礄 礅
+13	礆 (=險 -> 阜 / 鹼 -> 鹵) 礇 礈 礉 礊 礋 礌 礍 礎 礏 礐 礑 礒 礓 礔 礕 礖
+14	礗 礘 礙 礚 (=磕) 礛 礜 礝 礞 礟 礠 (=磁) 礡
+15	礢 礣 礤 礥 礦 礧 礨 礩 礪 礫 礬
+16	礭 礮 (=炮 -> 火) 礯 礰 礱 礲 礳 礴
+17	礵
+18	礶 礷
+19	礸
+20	礹

== Sinogram ==
As an independent sinogram it is one of the kyōiku kanji or kanji taught in elementary school in Japan. It is a first grade kanji.

== Literature ==
- Fazzioli, Edoardo (1987). Chinese calligraphy : from pictograph to ideogram : the history of 214 essential Chinese/Japanese characters. calligraphy by Rebecca Hon Ko. New York: Abbeville Press. ISBN 0-89659-774-1.
- Lunde, Ken (Jan 5, 2009). "Appendix J: Japanese Character Sets" (PDF). CJKV Information Processing: Chinese, Japanese, Korean & Vietnamese Computing (Second ed.). Sebastopol, Calif.: O'Reilly Media. ISBN 978-0-596-51447-1.
