= Radical 4 =

Kangxi radical

丿
- Radical 4 (U+2F03)
- 丿 (U+4E3F) "slash"

Pronunciations
- Pinyin: piě
- Bopomofo: ㄆ一ㄝˇ
- Wade–Giles: p'ieh3
- Cantonese Yale: pit
- Jyutping: pit3
- Pe̍h-ōe-jī: phia̍t
- Japanese Kana: ヘツ hetsu (on'yomi)
- Sino-Korean: 별 byeol
- Hán-Việt: phiệt

Names
- Chinese name(s): 撇 piě
- Japanese name(s): ノ no はらいぼう haraibō
- Hangul: 삐침 ppichim

Stroke order animation

Radical 4 or radical slash (丿部) meaning "slash" or "bend" is one of 6 of the 214 Kangxi radicals that are composed of only one stroke.

In the Kangxi Dictionary, there are 33 characters (out of 49,030) to be found under this radical.

It is highly similar to the Japanese katakana, no (ノ), thus colloquially referred to as "no" in Japanese.

丿 is also the 4th indexing component in the Table of Indexing Chinese Character Components predominantly adopted by Simplified Chinese dictionaries published in mainland China.

== Evolution ==
Large seal script character

Small seal script character

== Derived characters ==
Strokes	Characters
+0	丿 乀 乁
+1	乂 乃 乄^{JP}
+2	久 乆 (=久) 乇 么^{SC} (= 麼 -> 广) 义^{SC} (=義 -> 羊) 乊 之 乡^{SC} (=鄉 -> 邑)
+3	乌^{SC} (=烏 -> 火) 乏
+4	乍 乎 乐^{SC} (=樂 -> 木)
+5	丢 眾 乒 乓 乔^{SC} (=喬 -> 口)
+6	乕 (=虎 -> 虍)
+7	乖
+8	乗^{JP} (=乘)
+9	乘

== In calligraphy ==
The 6th principle stroke 掠 lüè as in 永

The 7th principle stroke 啄 zhuó as in 永

The only left-falling stroke in Radical 4, known as 撇 piě, is basic to Chinese calligraphy. It has two different forms, 掠 lüè and 啄 zhuó, in the eight principles of 永 (永字八法 Yǒngzì Bāfǎ).

== Literature ==
- Fazzioli, Edoardo (1987). Chinese calligraphy : from pictograph to ideogram : the history of 214 essential Chinese/Japanese characters. calligraphy by Rebecca Hon Ko. New York: Abbeville Press. ISBN 0-89659-774-1.
- Leyi, Li (1993). Tracing the Roots of Chinese Characters: 500 Cases. Beijing. ISBN 978-7-5619-0204-2.
