= Radical 167 =

Chinese character radical

金
- Radical 167 (U+2FA6)
- 金 (U+91D1) "gold, metal"

Pronunciations
- Pinyin: jīn
- Bopomofo: ㄐㄧㄣ
- Wade–Giles: chin1
- Cantonese Yale: gam1
- Jyutping: gam1
- Japanese Kana: キン kin / コン kon (on'yomi) かね kane (kun'yomi)
- Sino-Korean: 금 geum
- Hán-Việt: kim

Names
- Chinese name(s): (釒钅) 金字旁 jīnzìpáng (Bottom) 金字底 jīnzìdǐ
- Japanese name(s): 金/かね kane (釒) 金偏/かねへん kanehen
- Hangul: 쇠 soe, 김 gim

Stroke order animation

Radical 167 or radical gold (金部) meaning "gold" or "metal" is one of the 9 Kangxi radicals (214 radicals in total) composed of 8 strokes. It also represents the Chinese family name, Jin, which is No. 29[1] of the Hundred Family Surnames.

In the Kangxi Dictionary, there are 806 characters (out of 49,030) to be found under this radical.

In the Chinese Wuxing ("Five Phases"), 金 represents the element Metal.

金 is also the 176th indexing component in the Table of Indexing Chinese Character Components predominantly adopted by Simplified Chinese dictionaries published in mainland China, with 钅 (Simp.) and 釒 (Trad.) listed as its associated indexing components.

In Chinese names for chemical elements, 釒/钅means that this element is solid metal at room temperature and standard pressure.

== Evolution ==
Bronze script character

Large seal script character

Small seal script character

== Derived characters ==
Strokes	Characters (金釒)	Characters (钅)
+0	金 釒^{Component}	钅^{SC component} (=釒)
+1	釓 釔	钆^{SC} (=釓) 钇^{SC} (=釔)
+2	釕 釖 (=刀 -> 刀) 釗 釘 釙 釚 釛 釜 針 釞 釟 釠 (=亂 -> 乙) 釡 (=釜) 釢	针^{SC} (=針) 钉^{SC} (=釘) 钊^{SC} (=釗) 钋^{SC} (=釙) 钌^{SC} (=釕)
+3	釣 釤 釥 釦 釧 釨 釩 釪 釫 釬 釭 釮 釯 釰 釱 釲 釳 釴 釵 釶 釷 釸 釹 釺 釻 釼 (=劍 -> 刀)	钍^{SC} (=釷) 钎^{SC} (=釺) 钏^{SC} (=釧) 钐^{SC} (=釤) 钑 (=鈒) 钒^{SC} (=釩) 钓^{SC} (=釣) 钔^{SC} (=鍆) 钕^{SC} (=釹) 钖^{SC} (=鍚) 钗^{SC} (=釵)
+4	欽 釽 釾 釿 鈀 鈁 鈂 鈃 鈄 鈅 鈆 (=鉛) 鈇 鈈 鈉 鈊 鈋 鈌 鈍 鈎^{HK/GB TC} (=鉤) 鈏 鈐 鈑 鈒 鈓 鈔 鈕 鈖 鈗 鈘 鈙 鈚 鈛 (=鍋 鉞) 鈜 鈝 鈞 鈟 鈠 鈡 (=鐘) 鈢 (=鉩 / 璽 -> 玉) 鈣 鈤 鈥 鈦 鈧 鈨 鈩 鈪 鈫 (=鈙) 鈬^{JP nonstandard} (=鐸)	钘^{SC} (=鈃) 钙^{SC} (=鈣) 钚^{SC} (=鈈) 钛^{SC} (=鈦) 钜^{SC} (=鉅) 钝^{SC} (=鈍) 钞^{SC} (=鈔) 钟^{SC} (=鍾/鐘) 钠^{SC} (=鈉) 钡^{SC} (=鋇) 钢^{SC} (=鋼) 钣^{SC} (=鈑) 钤^{SC} (=鈐) 钥^{SC} (=鑰) 钦^{SC} (=欽) 钧^{SC} (=鈞) 钨^{SC} (=鎢) 钩^{SC} (=鉤) 钪^{SC} (=鈧) 钫^{SC} (=鈁) 钬^{SC} (=鈥) 钭^{SC} (=鈄) 钮^{SC} (=鈕) 钯^{SC} (=鈀)
+5	鈭 鈮 鈯 鈰 鈱 鈲 鈳 鈴 鈵 鈶 鈷 鈸 鈹 鈺 鈻 鈼 鈽 鈾 鈿 鉀 鉁 鉂 鉃 (=鏃) 鉄^{JP} (=鐵; also variant form of 紩 -> 糸) 鉅 鉆 鉇 鉈 鉉 鉊 鉋 鉌 鉍 鉎 鉏 鉐 鉑 鉒 鉓 鉔 鉕 鉖 鉗 鉘 鉙 鉚 鉛 鉜 鉝 鉞 鉟 鉠 鉡 鉢 (=缽 -> 缶) 鉣 鉤 鉥 鉦 鉧 鉨 鉩 鉪 鉫 鉬 鉭 鉮 鉯 鉰 鉱^{JP} (=礦 -> 石) 鉲 鉳 鉴^{SC} (=鑒) 銏	钰^{SC} (=鈺) 钱^{SC} (=錢) 钲^{SC} (=鉦) 钳^{SC} (=鉗) 钴^{SC} (=鈷) 钵^{SC} (=缽 -> 缶) 钶^{SC} (=鈳) 钷^{SC} (=鉕) 钸^{SC} (=鈽) 钹^{SC} (=鈸) 钺^{SC} (=鉞) 钻^{SC} (=鑽) 钼^{SC} (=鉬) 钽^{SC} (=鉭) 钾^{SC} (=鉀) 钿^{SC} (=鈿) 铀^{SC} (=鈾) 铁^{SC} (=鐵) 铂^{SC} (=鉑) 铃^{SC} (=鈴) 铄^{SC} (=鑠) 铅^{SC} (=鉛) 铆^{SC} (=鉚) 铇^{SC} (=鉋) 铈^{SC} (=鈰) 铉^{SC} (=鉉) 铊^{SC} (=鉈) 铋^{SC} (=鉍) 铌^{SC} (=鈮) 铍^{SC} (=鈹) 铎^{SC} (=鐸)
+6	鉵 鉶 鉷 鉸 鉹 鉺 鉻 鉽 鉾 鉿 銀 銁 銂 銃 銄 銅 銆 銇 銈 銉 銊 銋 銌 銍 銎 銐 銑 銒 (=鈃) 銓 銔 銕 銖 銗 銘 銙 銚 銛 銜 銝 銞 銟 銠 銡 銢 銣 銤 銥 銦 銧 銨 銩 銪 銫 銬 銭^{JP} (=錢) 銮^{SC} (=鑾) 銯 銰 銱	铏^{SC} (=鉶) 铐^{SC} (=銬) 铑^{SC} (=銠) 铒^{SC} (=鉺) 铓^{SC} (=鋩) 铔 (=錏) 铕^{SC} (=銪) 铖^{SC} (=鋮) 铗^{SC} (=鋏) 铘^{SC} (=鋣) 铙^{SC} (=鐃) 铚^{SC} (=銍) 铛^{SC} (=鐺) 铜^{SC} (=銅) 铝^{SC} (=鋁) 铞^{SC} (=銱) 铟^{SC} (=銦) 铠^{SC} (=鎧) 铡^{SC} (=鍘) 铢^{SC} (=銖) 铣^{SC} (=銑) 铤^{SC} (=鋌) 铥^{SC} (=銩) 铦^{SC} (=銛) 铧^{SC} (=鏵) 铨^{SC} (=銓) 铩^{SC} (=鎩) 铪^{SC} (=鉿) 铫^{SC} (=銚) 铬^{SC} (=鉻) 铭^{SC} (=銘) 铮^{SC} (=錚) 铯^{SC} (=銫) 铰^{SC} (=鉸) 铱^{SC} (=銥) 铲^{SC} (=鏟) 铳^{SC} (=銃) 铴^{SC} (=鐋) 铵^{SC} (=銨) 银^{SC} (=銀) 铷^{SC} (=銣)
+7	銲 (=焊 -> 火) 銳 銴 銵 銶 銷 銸 銹 (=鏽) 銺 銻 銼 銽 (=銛) 銾 (=汞 -> 水) 銿 鋀 鋁 鋂 鋃 鋄 (=錽) 鋅 鋆 鋇 鋈 鋉 鋊 鋋 鋌 鋍 鋎 鋏 鋐 鋑 鋒 鋓 鋔 鋕 鋖 鋗 鋘 鋙 鋚 鋛 (=礦 -> 石) 鋜 鋝 鋞 鋟 鋠 鋡 鋢 鋣 鋤 鋥 鋦 鋧 鋨 鋩 鋪 鋫 鋬 鋭^{JP/HK/GB TC} (=銳) 鋮 鋯 鋰 鋱 鋲 鋳^{JP} (=鑄) 鋴 鋵 鋶	铸^{SC} (=鑄) 铹^{SC} (=鐒) 铺^{SC} (=鋪) 铻^{SC} (=鋙) 铼^{SC} (=錸) 铽^{SC} (=鋱) 链^{SC} (=鏈) 铿^{SC} (=鏗) 销^{SC} (=銷) 锁^{SC} (=鎖) 锂^{SC} (=鋰) 锃^{SC} (=鋥) 锄^{SC} (=鋤) 锅^{SC} (=鍋) 锆^{SC} (=鋯) 锇^{SC} (=鋨) 锈^{SC} (=鏽) 锉^{SC} (=銼) 锊^{SC} (=鋝) 锋^{SC} (=鋒) 锌^{SC} (=鋅) 锍^{SC} (=鋶) 锎^{SC} (=鐦) 锏^{SC} (=鐧) 锐^{SC} (=銳) 锑^{SC} (=銻) 锒^{SC} (=鋃) 锓^{SC} (=鋟) 锔^{SC} (=鋦) 锕^{SC} (=錒)
+8	鉼 鋷 鋸 鋹 鋺 鋻 鋼 鋽 鋾 鋿 錀 錁 錂 錃 錄 錅 錆 錇 錈 錉 錊 錋 (=鏰) 錌 錍 錎 錏 錐 錑 錒 錓 錔 錕 錖 錗 錘 錙 錚 錛 錜 錝 錞 錟 錠 錡 錢 錣 錤 錥 錦 錧 錩 錪 錫 錬 錭 錮 錯 錰 錱 (=珍 -> 玉) 録^{JP} (=錄) 錳 錴 錵 錶 錷 錸 錹 錺 錻 錼 錽 錾^{SC} (=鏨) 錿 鍀 鍁 鍂 鍃 鍄 鍅 鍆 鍈	锖^{SC} (=錆) 锗^{SC} (=鍺) 锘^{SC} (=鍩) 错^{SC} (=錯) 锚^{SC} (=錨) 锛^{SC} (=錛) 锜^{SC} (=錡) 锝^{SC} (=鍀) 锞^{SC} (=錁) 锟^{SC} (=錕) 锠 (=錩) 锡^{SC} (=錫) 锢^{SC} (=錮) 锣^{SC} (=鑼) 锤^{SC} (=錘) 锥^{SC} (=錐) 锦^{SC} (=錦) 锧^{SC} (=鑕) 锨^{SC} (=鍁) 锩^{SC} (=錈) 锪^{SC} (=鍃) 锫^{SC} (=錇) 锬^{SC} (=錟) 锭^{SC} (=錠) 键^{SC} (=鍵) 锯^{SC} (=鋸) 锰^{SC} (=錳) 锱^{SC} (=錙)
+9	錨 鍇 鍉 鍊 鍋 鍌 鍍 鍎 鍏 鍐 鍑 鍒 鍓 鍔 鍕 鍖 鍗 鍘 鍙 鍚 鍛 鍜 鍝 鍞 鍟 (=鉎) 鍠 鍡 鍢 鍣 鍤 鍥 鍦 鍧 鍨 鍩 鍪 鍫 (=鍬) 鍬 鍭 鍮 鍯 鍰 鍱 鍲 鍳 (=鑒) 鍴 鍵 鍶 鍷 鍸 (=瑚 -> 玉) 鍹 鍺 鍻 鍼 (=針) 鍽 鍾 鍿 (=錙) 鎀 鎁 鎂 鎃 鎄 鎅 鎆 鎇	锲^{SC} (=鍥) 锳^{SC} (=鍈) 锴^{SC} (=鍇) 锵^{SC} (=鏘) 锶^{SC} (=鍶) 锷^{SC} (=鍔) 锸^{SC} (=鍤) 锹^{SC} (=鍬) 锺^{SC} (=鍾) 锻^{SC} (=鍛) 锼^{SC} (=鎪) 锽^{SC} (=鍠) 锾^{SC} (=鍰) 锿^{SC} (=鎄) 镀^{SC} (=鍍) 镁^{SC} (=鎂) 镂^{SC} (=鏤) 镃^{SC} (=鎡) 镄^{SC} (=鐨) 镅^{SC} (=鎇)
+10	鎈 鎉 鎊 鎋 鎌 鎍 鎎 鎏 鎐 鎑 鎒 鎓 鎔 鎕 鎖 鎗 鎘 鎙 鎚 (=錘) 鎛 鎜 鎝 鎞 鎟 鎠 (=鋼) 鎡 鎢 鎣 鎤 鎥 鎦 鎧 鎨 鎪 鎫 鎬 鎭 (=鎮) 鎮 鎯 鎰 鎱 鎲 鎳 鎴 鎵 鎶 鎷 鎸 (=鐫) 鎹 鎺 鎻 (=鎖) 鎼 (=罅 -> 缶) 鎽 鎾 (=熅 -> 火) 鎿	镆^{SC} (=鏌) 镇^{SC} (=鎮) 镈^{SC} (=鎛) 镉^{SC} (=鎘) 镊^{SC} (=鑷) 镋^{SC} (=鎲) 镌^{SC} (=鐫) 镍^{SC} (=鎳) 镎^{SC} (=鎿) 镏^{SC} (=鎦) 镐^{SC} (=鎬) 镑^{SC} (=鎊) 镒^{SC} (=鎰) 镓^{SC} (=鎵) 镔^{SC} (=鑌) 镕^{SC} (=鎔)
+11	鎩 鏀 鏁 (=鎖) 鏂 鏃 鏄 鏅 鏆 鏇 鏈 鏉 鏊 鏋 鏌 鏍 鏎 鏏 鏐 鏑 鏒 鏓 鏔 鏕 鏖 鏗 鏘 鏙 鏚 (=戚 -> 戈) 鏛 鏜 鏝 鏞 鏟 鏠 鏡 鏢 鏣 鏤 鏥 (=鏽) 鏦 鏧 鏨 鏩 鏪 鏫 鏬 鏭 鏮 鏯 鏰 鏱 鏲 鏹	镖^{SC} (=鏢) 镗^{SC} (=鏜) 镘^{SC} (=鏝) 镙 (=鏍) 镚^{SC} (=鏰) 镛^{SC} (=鏞) 镜^{SC} (=鏡) 镝^{SC} (=鏑) 镞^{SC} (=鏃) 镟^{SC nonstandard} (=鏇) 镠^{SC} (=鏐)
+12	鏳 鏵 鏶 鏷 鏸 鏺 鏻 鏼 鏽 鏾 鏿 鐀 鐁 鐂 鐃 鐄 鐅 鐆 鐇 鐈 鐉 鐊 鐋 鐌 鐍 鐎 鐏 鐐 鐑 鐒 鐓 鐔 鐕 鐖 鐗 (=鐧) 鐘 鐙 鐚 鐛 鐜 鐝 鐞 鐟 鐠 鐡 (=鐵) 鐢 鐣 鐤 (=鼎 -> 鼎) 鐥 鐦 鐧 鐨	镡^{SC} (=鐔) 镢^{SC} (=鐝) 镣^{SC} (=鐐) 镤^{SC} (=鏷) 镥^{SC} (=鑥) 镦^{SC} (=鐓) 镧^{SC} (=鑭) 镨^{SC} (=鐠) 镩^{SC} (=鑹) 镪^{SC} (=鏹) 镫^{SC} (=鐙)
+13	鏴 鐩 鐪 鐫 鐬 鐭 鐮 鐯 鐰 鐱 鐲 鐳 鐴 鐵 鐶 鐷 鐸 鐹 鐺 鐻 鐼 鐽 鐾 鐿 鑀 鑁 (=鍐)	镬^{SC} (=鑊) 镭^{SC} (=鐳) 镮^{SC} (=鐶) 镯^{SC} (=鐲) 镰^{SC} (=鐮) 镱^{SC} (=鐿)
+14	鑂 鑃 鑄 鑅 鑆 鑇 鑈 鑉 鑊 鑋 鑌 鑍 鑎 (=匱 -> 匚) 鑏 鑐 鑑 鑒 鑓 鑔 鑧	镲^{SC} (=鑔)
+15	鑕 鑖 鑗 鑘 鑙 鑚 (=鑽) 鑛 (=礦 -> 石) 鑜 鑝 鑞 鑟 鑠 鑡 鑢 鑣 鑤 (=刨 -> 刀) 鑥 鑦	镳^{SC} (=鑣) 镴^{SC} (=鑞)
+16	鑨 鑩 鑪 鑫 鑬	
+17	鑭 鑮 鑯 鑰 鑱 鑲 鑳	镵^{SC} (=鑱) 镶^{SC} (=鑲)
+18	鑴 鑵 (=罐 -> 缶) 鑶 鑷 鑸 鑹 鑺	
+19	鑻 鑼 鑽 鑾 鑿	
+20	钀 钁 钂	
+21	钃 钄	

== Literature ==
- Fazzioli, Edoardo (1987). Chinese calligraphy : from pictograph to ideogram : the history of 214 essential Chinese/Japanese characters. calligraphy by Rebecca Hon Ko. New York: Abbeville Press. ISBN 0-89659-774-1.
