= Radical 76 =

Chinese character radical

欠
- Radical 76 (U+2F4B)
- 欠 (U+6B20) "owe, lack, yawn"

Pronunciations
- Pinyin: qiàn
- Bopomofo: ㄑㄧㄢˋ
- Gwoyeu Romatzyh: chiann
- Wade–Giles: chʻien^{4}
- Cantonese Yale: him
- Jyutping: him3
- Pe̍h-ōe-jī: khiàm
- Japanese Kana: ケン ken (on'yomi) あくび akubi (kun'yomi)
- Sino-Korean: 흠 heum

Names
- Chinese name(s): 欠字旁 qiànzìpáng
- Japanese name(s): 欠伸/あくび akubi 欠ける/かける kakeru 欠旁/けんづくり kendzukuri 吹き旁/ふきづくり fukidzukuri
- Hangul: 하품 hapum

Stroke order animation

Radical 76 or radical lack (欠部) which means "owe", "lack", or "yawn" is one of the 34 Kangxi radicals (214 radicals in total) composed of 4 strokes. In the Kangxi Dictionary, there are 235 characters (out of 49,030) to be found under this radical. 欠 is also the 90th indexing component in the Table of Indexing Chinese Character Components predominantly adopted by Simplified Chinese dictionaries published in mainland China.

== Evolution ==
A person (人) with mouth open, top part unrelated to 刀. Mirror of ⺛; unrelated to 久.

Oracle bone script character

Large seal script character

Small seal script character

Clerical script

== Derived characters ==
Strokes	Characters
+0	欠
+2	次^{SC/JP}/次^{TC} 欢^{SC} (=歡)
+4	欣 欤^{SC} (=歟) 欥 欦 欧^{SC/JP} (=歐)
+5	欨 欪
+6	欫 欬 欭 欮 欯 欰 欱
+7	欲 欳 欴 欵 欶 欷 欸
+8	欹 欺 欻 欼 欽 款 欿 歄^{GB TC variant}
+9	欩 歀 歁 歂 歃 歄^{Traditional variant} 歅 歆 歇 歈
+10	歊 歋 歌 歍
+11	歉 歎 歏 歐 歑 歒 歓^{JP} (=歡) 歔^{SC variant}
+12	歔^{TC variant} 歕 歖 歗 歘 歙 歚
+13	歛 歜 歝
+14	歞 歟
+15	歠 歡^{GB TC variant}
+17	歡^{Traditional variant}

== Hanzi ==
It is an independent Hanzi and is a fourth grade Kyoiku kanji.

== Literature ==
- Fazzioli, Edoardo (1987). Chinese calligraphy : from pictograph to ideogram : the history of 214 essential Chinese/Japanese characters. calligraphy by Rebecca Hon Ko. New York: Abbeville Press. ISBN 0-89659-774-1.
- Lunde, Ken (Jan 5, 2009). "Appendix J: Japanese Character Sets" (PDF). CJKV Information Processing: Chinese, Japanese, Korean & Vietnamese Computing (Second ed.). Sebastopol, Calif.: O'Reilly Media. ISBN 978-0-596-51447-1.
