= Radical 121 =

Chinese character radical

缶
- Radical 121 (U+2F78)
- 缶 (U+7F36) "jar"

Pronunciations
- Pinyin: fǒu
- Bopomofo: ㄈㄡˇ
- Wade–Giles: fou3
- Cantonese Yale: fau2
- Jyutping: fau2
- Japanese Kana: フ fu / フウ fū (on'yomi) ほとぎ hotogi (kun'yomi)
- Sino-Korean: 부 bu

Names
- Japanese name(s): 缶 ほとぎ (Left) 缶偏/ほとぎへん hotogihen 缶/かん kan
- Hangul: 장군 janggun

Stroke order animation

Radical 121 or radical jar (缶部) which means jar, is one of the 29 Kangxi radicals (214 radicals in total) composed of 6 strokes. In the Kangxi Dictionary, there are 77 characters (out of 49,030) to be found under this radical. 缶 is also the 133rd indexing component in the Table of Indexing Chinese Character Components predominantly adopted by Simplified Chinese dictionaries published in mainland China. In Japanese, 缶 is the shinjitai form of 罐, but the two characters are historically irrelevant.

== Evolution ==
Oracle bone script character

Spring and Autumn period bronze script

Large seal script character

Small seal script character

== Derived characters ==
Strokes	Characters
+0	缶
+2	缷 (=卸 -> 卩)
+3	缸
+4	缹 缺 缼 (=缺)
+5	缻 (=缶) 缽
+6	缾 (=瓶 -> 瓦) 缿 罀
+8	罁 罂^{SC} (=罌)
+10	罃
+11	罄 罅 罆
+12	罇 (=樽 -> 木) 罈 罉
+13	罊 罋 (=甕 -> 瓦)
+14	罌
+15	罍
+16	罎 (=罈) 罏
+18	罐

== Literature ==
- Fazzioli, Edoardo (1987). Chinese calligraphy : from pictograph to ideogram : the history of 214 essential Chinese/Japanese characters. calligraphy by Rebecca Hon Ko. New York: Abbeville Press. ISBN 0-89659-774-1.
