= Radical 51 =

Chinese character radical

干
- Radical 51 (U+2F32)
- 干 (U+5E72) "oppose, dried"

Pronunciations
- Pinyin: gān
- Bopomofo: ㄍㄢ
- Gwoyeu Romatzyh: gan
- Wade–Giles: kan^{1}
- Cantonese Yale: gōn
- Jyutping: gon1
- Pe̍h-ōe-jī: kan
- Japanese Kana: カン kan (on'yomi) ほす hosu (kun'yomi)
- Sino-Korean: 간 gan

Names
- Japanese name(s): 干/ほす hosu 干/かん kan 一十/いちじゅう ichijū (chiefly primary education)
- Hangul: 방패 banpae

Stroke order animation

Radical 51 or radical dry (干部) meaning "oppose" or "dried" is one of 31 out of the total 214 Kangxi radicals written with three strokes.

There are only nine characters derived from this radical, and some modern dictionaries have discontinued its use as a section header. In such characters that comprise 干 as a component, it mostly takes a purely phonetic role, as in 肝 "liver" (which falls under radical 130 肉 "meat").

干 is also the 27th indexing component in the Table of Indexing Chinese Character Components predominantly adopted by Simplified Chinese dictionaries published in mainland China.

== Evolution ==
Oracle bone script character

Bronze script character

Chu slip and silk script

Large Seal Script character

Small Seal Script character

In origin, the character may depict either a pestle or a shield.; unrelated to ⼗, 于 and 千.

== Derived characters ==
Strokes	Characters
+ 0	干
+ 2	平^{SC/TC/JP}/平^{KO}
+ 3	年 幵 并 (also SC form of 並 -> 一 / 併 -> 人)
+ 5	幷/幷^{Kangxi} (=并) 幸
+10	幹

== In simplified Chinese ==
As a character (not a radical), 干 has risen to new importance, and even notoriety due to the 20th-century Chinese writing reform. In simplified Chinese, 干 takes the place of a number of other characters with the phonetic value gān or gàn, e.g. of 乾 "dry" or 幹 "trunk, body", so that 干 may today take a wide variety of meanings.

The high frequency and polysemy of the character pose a serious problem for Chinese translation software. The word 幹 gàn "tree trunk; to do" (rarely also "human body"), rendered as 干 in simplified Chinese, acquired the meaning of "to fuck" in Chinese slang. Notoriously, the 2002 edition of the widespread Jinshan Ciba Chinese-to-English dictionary for the Jinshan Kuaiyi translation software rendered every occurrence of 干 as "fuck", resulting in a large number of signs with irritating English translations throughout China, often mistranslating 乾 gān "dried" as in 干果 "dried fruit" in supermarkets as "fuck the fruits" or similar.

== Sinogram ==
The radical is also used as an independent Chinese character. It is one of the Kyōiku kanji or Kanji taught in elementary school in Japan. It is a fifth grade kanji.

== See also ==
- Fuck#Machine mistranslation

== Literature ==
- Fazzioli, Edoardo (1987). Chinese calligraphy : from pictograph to ideogram: the history of 214 essential Chinese/Japanese characters. calligraphy by Rebecca Hon Ko. New York: Abbeville Press. ISBN 0-89659-774-1.
- Leyi Li: "Tracing the Roots of Chinese Characters: 500 Cases". Beijing 1993, ISBN 978-7-5619-0204-2
- Rick Harbaugh, Chinese Characters: A Genealogy and Dictionary, Yale University Press (1998), ISBN 978-0-9660750-0-7.
