= Radical 71 =

Chinese character radical

无
- Radical 71 (U+2F46)
- 无 (U+65E0) "negative, no, not"

Pronunciations
- Pinyin: wú, mó
- Bopomofo: ㄨˊ
- Wade–Giles: wu2 mou2
- Cantonese Yale: mòuh
- Jyutping: mou4
- Pe̍h-ōe-jī: bû
- Japanese Kana: ム mu / ブ bu (on'yomi) な-い na-i (kun'yomi)
- Sino-Korean: 무 mu

Names
- Japanese name(s): 无し/なし nashi 无/ぶ bu 无繞/むにょう munyō 既の旁/すでのつくり sudenotsukuri
- Hangul: 없을 eopseul

Stroke order animation

Radical 71 or radical not (无部) meaning "nothing" or "negative" is one of the 34 Kangxi radicals (214 radicals in total) composed of 4 strokes.

In the Kangxi Dictionary, there are 12 characters (out of 49,030) to be found under this radical.

无 is also the 62nd indexing component in the Table of Indexing Chinese Character Components predominantly adopted by Simplified Chinese dictionaries published in mainland China, with 旡 being its associated indexing component.

无 as an individual character is a variant form of 無. In Simplified Chinese, 无 is used as the simplified form of 無.

== Evolution ==
=== 无 ===
Historic forms of 无 and 無 are the same. Unrelated to 旡.

Oracle bone script

Bronze script

Chu slip and silk script

Qin slip script

Large seal script (无)

Large seal script (無)

Small seal script

=== 旡 ===
Reverse of 欠.

Oracle bone script

Large seal script (旡)

Small seal script

== Derived characters ==
Strokes	Characters
+0	无^{SC/variant} (=無 -> 火) 旡
+5	既
+7	旣^{Kangxi/KO} (=既)
+9	旤

== Literature ==
- Fazzioli, Edoardo (1987). Chinese calligraphy : from pictograph to ideogram : the history of 214 essential Chinese/Japanese characters. calligraphy by Rebecca Hon Ko. New York: Abbeville Press. ISBN 0-89659-774-1.
- Lunde, Ken (Jan 5, 2009). "Appendix J: Japanese Character Sets" (PDF). CJKV Information Processing: Chinese, Japanese, Korean & Vietnamese Computing (Second ed.). Sebastopol, Calif.: O'Reilly Media. ISBN 978-0-596-51447-1.
