= Commandery (China) =

Historical administrative division of China

- Chinese: 郡
Transcriptions
Standard Mandarin
- Hanyu Pinyin: jùn
- Wade–Giles: chün

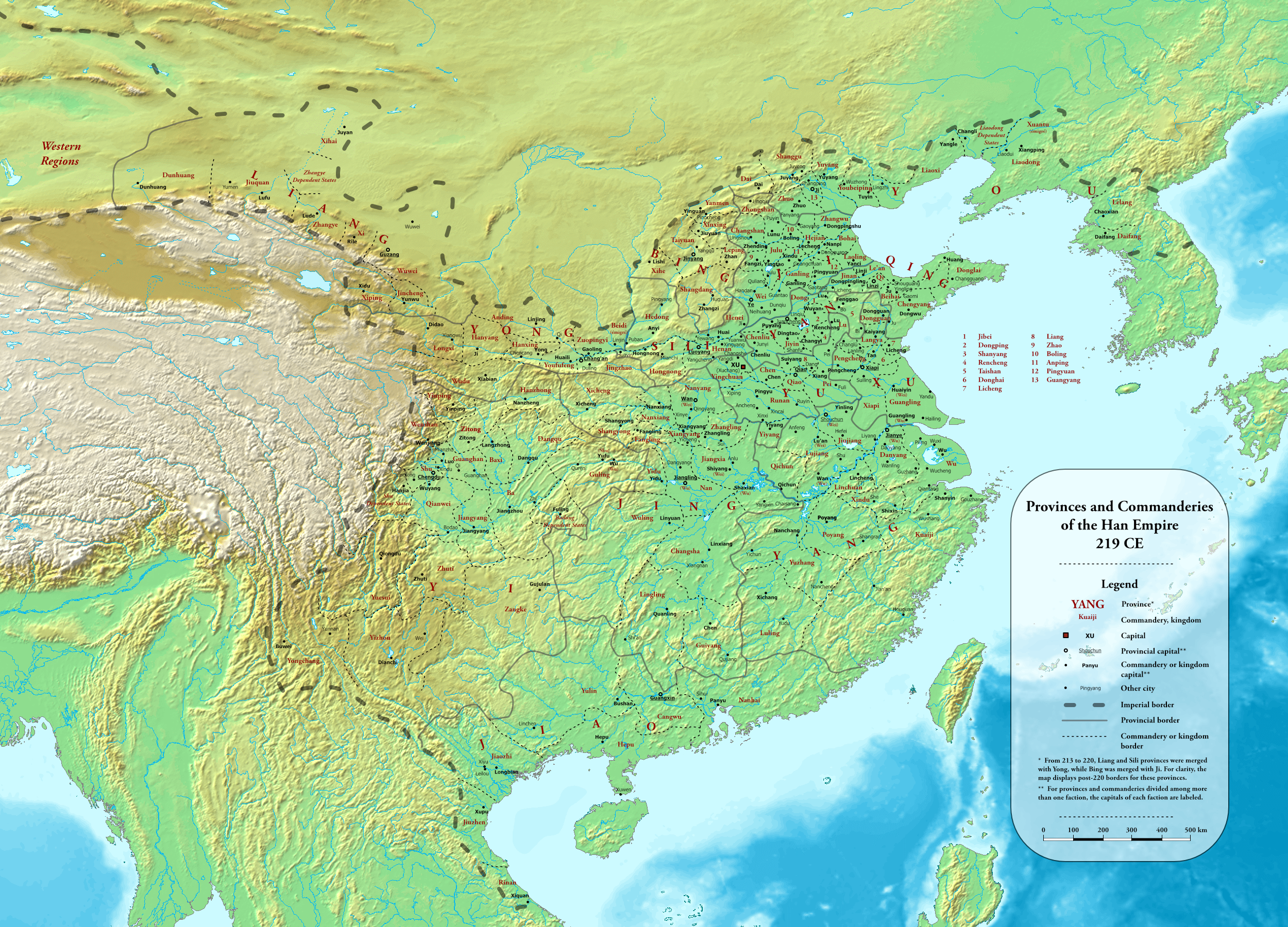
Commanderies and provinces of the Han dynasty, 219 CE

A commandery (Chinese: 郡; pinyin: jùn) was a historical administrative division of China that was in use from the Eastern Zhou (c. 7th century BCE) until the early Tang dynasty (c. 7th century CE). Several neighboring countries adopted Chinese commanderies as the basis for their own administrative divisions.

== History and development ==
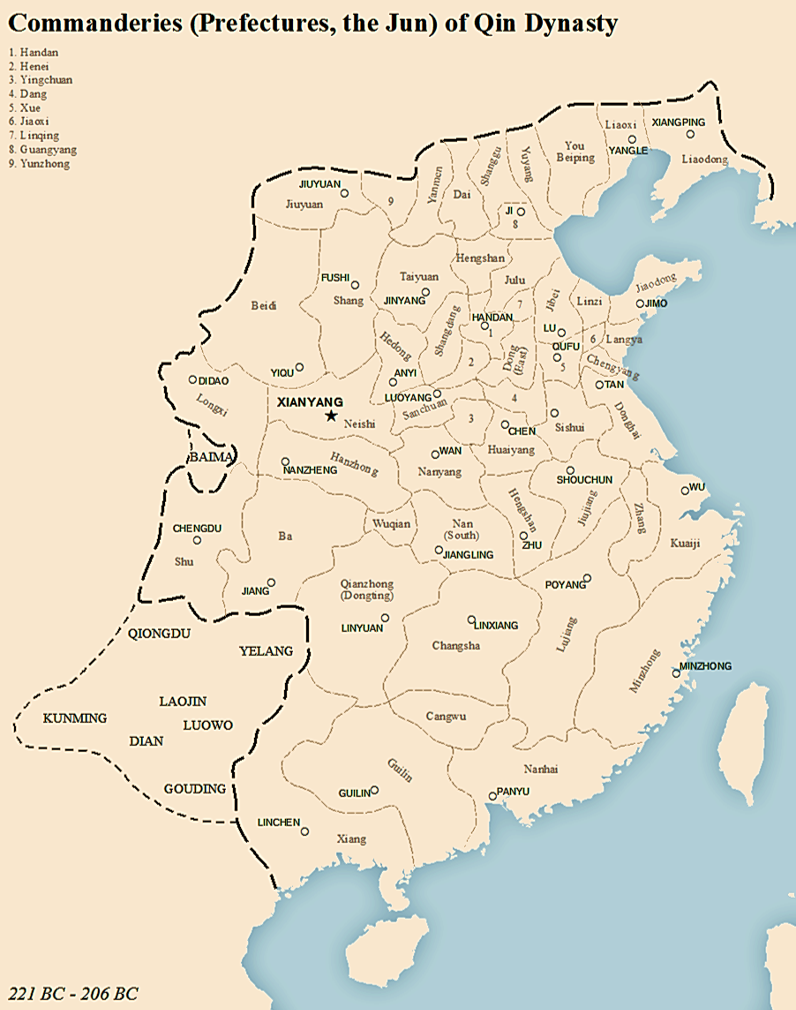
Commanderies of the Qin dynasty.

=== China ===
==== Eastern Zhou ====
During the Eastern Zhou's Spring and Autumn period from the 8th to 5th centuries BCE, the larger and more powerful of the Zhou's vassal states—including Qin, Jin and Wei—began annexing their smaller rivals. These new lands were not part of their original fiefs and were instead organized into counties (xiàn). Eventually, commanderies were developed as marchlands between the major realms. Despite having smaller populations and ranking lower on the official hierarchies, the commanderies were larger and boasted greater military strength than the counties.

As each state's territory gradually took shape in the 5th- to 3rd-century BCE Warring States period, the commanderies at the borders flourished. This gave rise to a two-tier administrative system, with counties subordinate to commanderies. Each of the states' territories was by now comparatively larger, hence there was no need for the military might of a commandery in the inner regions where counties were established. The border commanderies' military and strategic significance became more important than those of counties.

==== Qin dynasty ====
Following the unification of China in 221 BCE under the Qin Empire, the Qin government still had to engage in military activity because there were rebels from among the six former states who were unwilling to submit to Qin rule. As a result, Qin Shi Huangdi set up 36 commanderies in the Qin Empire, each subdivided into counties. This established the first two-tier administrative system known to exist in China.

==== Han dynasty and Three Kingdoms period ====
When the Han dynasty triumphed over Chu in 206 BCE, the Zhou feudal system was initially reinstated, with Emperor Gaozu recognizing nearly independent kings and granting large territories to his relatives. These two sets of kingdoms were placed under hereditary rulers assisted by a chancellor (xiàng). Parallel to these, some Qin commanderies were continued, placed under a governor appointed directly by the central government.

By the Eastern Han dynasty, the commanderies were subordinated to a new division, the province (zhōu). — establishing a three-tier system composed of provinces, commanderies, and counties. Based upon legendary accounts of the Yellow Emperor's Nine Provinces which were geographic rather than formal political areas, there were initially 13 provinces and roughly 100 commanderies.

==== Jin dynasty and the Southern and Northern dynasties ====
China was greatly divided during the following four centuries, during the Jin and Northern and Southern dynasties period. The number of administrative units drastically increased due to intense warfare, fluid political boundaries, forced migrations, widespread population loss, and the loss of central government control in many areas particularly during the Sixteen Kingdoms. Although the legacy three-tier system was still in formal effect, rulers of various kingdoms had defined and re-defined provinces until they became increasingly sub-divided, blurring the distinction between provinces and commanderies and reflecting the chaos of China at the time.

==== Sui and Tang dynasties ====
China was finally re-united by Emperor Wen of the Sui (581–618) in 589. As there were already over 100 provinces, the province and commandery levels of the administration were merged into one level, typically rendered in English as prefecture, marking the end of the commandery. Some Emperors to referred to this level of administration as a jun ("commandery"), but most used zhou ("province") and the political function was the same, regardless. By the end of the Tang dynasty the term jun saw no more use in China (and a new higher tier of administrative unit, the circuit had been introduced, bringing back a three-tier system).

== Administrative hierarchy ==
In the Warring States period, the chief administrative officers of the areas were known as commandery administrators (Chinese: 郡守; pinyin: jùnshǒu; lit. 'defender of the jun'). In the Han dynasty, the position of junshou was renamed grand administrator (太守; tàishǒu; 'grand defender'). Both terms are also translated as "governor". A grand administrator drew an annual salary of 2,000 dan (石) of grain according to the pinzhi (品秩; pǐnzhì) system of administrative rank. Many former grand administrators were promoted to the posts of the Three Ducal Ministers or Nine Ministers later in their careers.

== See also ==
- Zhou, poetically referred to as jun after the Tang dynasty, alluding to its historical equivalents
- Fu, poetically referred to as jun in the Ming dynasty and Qing dynasty
- Government of the Han dynasty
