= Radical 60 =

Chinese character radical

彳
- Radical 60 (U+2F3B)
- 彳 (U+5F73) "step"

Pronunciations
- Pinyin: chì
- Bopomofo: ㄔˋ
- Gwoyeu Romatzyh: chyh
- Wade–Giles: chʻih^{4}
- Cantonese Yale: chīk
- Jyutping: cik1
- Pe̍h-ōe-jī: chhek
- Japanese Kana: テキ teki (on'yomi)
- Sino-Korean: 척 cheok

Names
- Chinese name(s): 雙人旁/双人旁 shuāngrénpáng
- Japanese name(s): 行人偏/ぎょうにんべん gyōninben
- Hangul: 걸을 georel

Stroke order animation

Radical 60 or radical step (彳部) meaning "step" is one of the 214 Kangxi radicals, and one of 214 composed of three strokes.

In the Kangxi Dictionary, there are 215 characters (out of 49,030) to be found under this radical.

彳 is also the 41st indexing component in the Table of Indexing Chinese Character Components predominantly adopted by Simplified Chinese dictionaries published in mainland China.

== Evolution ==
From 行; top component of 辵.

Bronze script character

Large seal script character

Small seal script character

== Derived characters ==
Strokes	Characters
+0	彳
+3	彴 彵
+4	彶 彷 彸 役 彺 彻^{SC} (=徹)
+5	彼 彽 彾 彿 往 征 (also SC form of 徵) 徂 徃 径^{SC}/径^{JP} (=徑)
+6	待 徆 徇 很 徉 徊 律 後 徍
+7	徎 徏 徐 徑 徒 従^{JP} (=從) 徔 徕^{SC} (=徠)
+8	徖 得 徘 徙 徚 徛 徜 徝 從 徟 徠 御 徢 徣 (=借 -> 人)
+9	徤 徥 徦 徧 (=遍 -> 辵) 徨 復 循 徫 街
+10	徬 徭 微 徯 徰
+11	徱 徲 徳^{JP} (=德) 徴^{JP} (=徵)
+12	徵 徶 德 徸 徹 徺
+13	徻 徼
+14	徽 徾
+16	徿
+17	忀 忁
+18	忂

== Literature ==
- Fazzioli, Edoardo (1987). Chinese calligraphy : from pictograph to ideogram : the history of 214 essential Chinese/Japanese characters. calligraphy by Rebecca Hon Ko. New York: Abbeville Press. ISBN 0-89659-774-1.
- Lunde, Ken (Jan 5, 2009). "Appendix J: Japanese Character Sets" (PDF). CJKV Information Processing: Chinese, Japanese, Korean & Vietnamese Computing (Second ed.). Sebastopol, Calif.: O'Reilly Media. ISBN 978-0-596-51447-1.
