= 王 =

王 is a Chinese character encountered in East Asian languages. It was grouped with 玉 as Radical 96 in the Kangxi radicals.

It may also refer to:

- kings, in reference to non-Chinese states
- the early Chinese sovereigns of the Xia, Shang, and Zhou dynasties (sometimes titled "emperor" in translation)
- princes of the later dynasties
- Wang (surname), a Chinese surname
- Oh (Japanese surname), a Japanese surname
- a Khitan small script
