= Radical 144 =

Chinese character radical

行
- Radical 144 (U+2F8F)
- 行 (U+884C) "go, do"

Pronunciations
- Pinyin: xíng, háng
- Bopomofo: ㄒㄧㄥˋ, ㄏㄤˊ
- Wade–Giles: hsing2
- Cantonese Yale: haang4, hang4, hang6, hong4
- Jyutping: haang4, hang4, hang6, hong4
- Japanese Kana: コウ kō / アン an (on'yomi) ゆ-く yu-ku / おこな-う okona-u (kun'yomi)
- Sino-Korean: 행 haeng

Names
- Japanese name(s): 行構/ぎょうがまえ/ゆきがまえ gyōgamae/yukigamae
- Hangul: 다닐 danil 행실 haengsil

Stroke order animation

Radical 144 or radical walk enclosure (行部) meaning "go" or "do" is one of the 29 Kangxi radicals (214 radicals in total) composed of 6 strokes.

In the Kangxi Dictionary, there are 53 characters (out of 49,030) to be found under this radical.

行 is not used as an indexing component (radical) in Simplified Chinese. Characters with this radical are classified under radical 彳 (No. 60 in the Kangxi Dictionary; No. 41 in the Table of Indexing Chinese Character Components) in Simplified Chinese.

== Evolution ==
Shang dynasty Oracle bone script

Western Zhou Bronze script

Western Zhou Bronze script variant

Spring and Autumn period bronze script

Warring States period bronze script

Chu slip and silk script

Qin slip script

Large seal script

Large seal script variant

Small seal script

Qing dynasty Clerical script

== Derived characters ==
| Strokes | Characters |
|---|---|
| +0 | 行 |
| +3 | 衍 衎 |
| +4 | 衏 |
| +5 | 衐 衑 衒 術 衔^{SC} (=銜 -> 金) |
| +6 | 衕 衖 街 衘 (=銜 -> 金) |
| +7 | 衙 |
| +9 | 衚 衛 衜 衝 |
| +10 | 衞^{HK} (=衛) 衟 (=道 -> 辵) 衠 衡 |
| +18 | 衢 |

== Sinogram ==
The radical is also used as an independent Chinese character. It is one of the kyōiku kanji or kanji taught in elementary school in Japan. It is a second grade kanji.

== Literature ==
- Fazzioli, Edoardo (1987). Chinese calligraphy : from pictograph to ideogram : the history of 214 essential Chinese/Japanese characters. calligraphy by Rebecca Hon Ko. New York: Abbeville Press. ISBN 0-89659-774-1.
- Lunde, Ken (Jan 5, 2009). "Appendix J: Japanese Character Sets" (PDF). CJKV Information Processing: Chinese, Japanese, Korean & Vietnamese Computing (Second ed.). Sebastopol, Calif.: O'Reilly Media. ISBN 978-0-596-51447-1.
