= Radical 84 =

Chinese character radical

气
- Radical 84 (U+2F53)
- 气 (U+6C14) "steam, air, breath"

Pronunciations
- Pinyin: qì
- Bopomofo: ㄑㄧˋ
- Gwoyeu Romatzyh: chih
- Wade–Giles: chʻi⁴
- Cantonese Yale: hei
- Jyutping: hei³
- Pe̍h-ōe-jī: khì
- Japanese Kana: キ ki (on'yomi)
- Sino-Korean: 기 gi
- Hán-Việt: khí

Names
- Chinese name(s): 氣字頭/气字头 qìzìtóu
- Japanese name(s): 気構え/きがまえ kigamae
- Hangul: 기운 giun

Stroke order animation

Radical 84 or radical steam (气部) meaning "steam", "air" or "breath" is one of the 34 Kangxi radicals (214 radicals in total) composed of 4 strokes.

In the Kangxi Dictionary, there are 17 characters (out of 49,030) to be found under this radical.

气 is also the 81st indexing component in the Table of Indexing Chinese Character Components predominantly adopted by Simplified Chinese dictionaries published in mainland China.

The radical character is an ancient form of 氣, and used as the simplified form of it in Simplified Chinese.

== Evolution ==
=== 气 ===
Oracle bone script

Western Zhou bronze script

Spring and Autumn period bronze script

Chu slip and silk script

Chu slip and silk script variant

Qin slip script

Large seal script

Small seal script

=== 氣 (Shinjitai: 気, Simplified: 气) ===
Phono-semantic compound: phonetic 气 (OC *kʰɯds) + semantic 米 (“rice”).

Qin slip script

Large seal script

Small seal script

== Derived characters ==
Strokes	Characters
+0	气 (also SC/ancient variant form of 氣)
+1	氕 (^{1}H)
+2	氖 (Ne) 気^{JP} (=氣) 氘 (^{2}H)
+3	氙 (Xe) 氚 (^{3}H)
+4	氛 氜 氝
+5	氞 氟 (F) 氠 氡 (Rn) 氢^{SC} (=氫)
+6	氣 氤 氥 氦 (He) 氧 (O) 氨 (ammonia, NH_{3}) 氩^{SC} (=氬)
+7	氪 (Kr) 氫 (H)
+8	氬 (Ar) 氭 氮 (N) 氯 (Cl) 氰 (cyanogen, NCCN)
+9	氱 氲^{SC/HK} (=氳)
+10	氳

In modern Chinese, this radical is used to form characters representing gaseous chemical elements and compounds.

== Literature ==
- Fazzioli, Edoardo (1987). Chinese calligraphy : from pictograph to ideogram : the history of 214 essential Chinese/Japanese characters. calligraphy by Rebecca Hon Ko. New York: Abbeville Press. ISBN 0-89659-774-1.
- Lunde, Ken (Jan 5, 2009). "Appendix J: Japanese Character Sets" (PDF). CJKV Information Processing: Chinese, Japanese, Korean & Vietnamese Computing (Second ed.). Sebastopol, Calif.: O'Reilly Media. ISBN 978-0-596-51447-1.
