= Radical 123 =

Chinese character radical

羊
- Radical 123 (U+2F7A)
- 羊 (U+7F8A) "sheep"

Pronunciations
- Pinyin: yáng
- Bopomofo: ㄧㄤˊ
- Gwoyeu Romatzyh: yang
- Wade–Giles: yang^{2}
- Cantonese Yale: yèuhng
- Jyutping: joeng4
- Japanese Kana: ヨウ yō (on'yomi) ひつじ hitsuji (kun'yomi)
- Sino-Korean: 양 yang

Names
- Chinese name(s): (Left) 羊字旁 yángzìpáng (Top) 羊字頭/羊字头 yángzìtóu
- Japanese name(s): 羊/ひつじ hitsuji (Left) 羊偏/ひつじへん hitsujihen
- Hangul: 양 yang

Stroke order animation

Radical 123 or radical sheep (羊部) meaning "sheep" or "goat" is one of the 29 Kangxi radicals (214 radicals in total) composed of 6 strokes.

In the Kangxi Dictionary, there are 156 characters (out of 49,030) to be found under this radical.

羊 is also the 143rd indexing component in the Table of Indexing Chinese Character Components predominantly adopted by Simplified Chinese dictionaries published in mainland China, with ⺶ and 𦍌 being its associated indexing component.

== Evolution ==
Shang dynasty Oracle bone script

Shang dynasty Western Zhou Bronze script

Bronze script

Large seal script

Small seal script

== Derived characters ==
| Strokes | Characters |
|---|---|
| +0 | 羊 |
| +1 | 羋 |
| +2 | 羌 |
| +3 | 羍 美 羏 羐 (=羑) 羑 |
| +4 | 羒 羓 羔 羖 羗 (=羌/羑) 羘 羙 (=美 羔) |
| +5 | 着^{SC/HK} (=著 -> 艸) 羕 羚 羛 羜 羝 羞 羟^{SC} (=羥) |
| +6 | 羠 羡^{SC} (=羨) 羢 (=絨 -> 糸) |
| +7 | 羣^{HK} (=群) 群 羥 羦 羧 羨 義 羪 |
| +8 | 羫 |
| +9 | 羬 羭 羮 (=羹) 羯 羰 |
| +10 | 羱 羲 |
| +12 | 羳 羴 羵 |
| +13 | 羶 羷 羸 羹 |
| +14 | 羺 |
| +15 | 羻 羼 |

== Sinogram ==
The radical is also used as an independent Chinese character. It is one of the kyōiku kanji or kanji taught in the third grade in Japan.

== See also ==
- Yang (surname 羊)

== Literature ==
- Fazzioli, Edoardo (1987). Chinese calligraphy : from pictograph to ideogram : the history of 214 essential Chinese/Japanese characters. calligraphy by Rebecca Hon Ko. New York: Abbeville Press. ISBN 0-89659-774-1.
