= Radical 24 =

Chinese character radical

十
- Radical 24 (U+2F17)
- 十 (U+5341) "ten"

Pronunciations
- Pinyin: shí
- Bopomofo: ㄕˊ
- Gwoyeu Romatzyh: shyr
- Wade–Giles: shih^{2}
- Cantonese Yale: sahp
- Jyutping: sap6
- Pe̍h-ōe-jī: cha̍p (col.) si̍p (lit.)
- Japanese Kana: ジュウ jū (on'yomi) と to / とお tō (kun'yomi)
- Sino-Korean: 십 sip
- Hán-Việt: thập

Names
- Japanese name(s): 十偏 jūhen
- Hangul: 열 yeol

Stroke order animation

Radical 24 or radical ten (十部) meaning ten, complete, or perfect, is one of 23 of the 214 Kangxi radicals that are composed of 2 strokes.

In the Kangxi Dictionary, there are 55 characters (out of 40,000) to be found under this radical.

十 is also the 6th indexing component in the Table of Indexing Chinese Character Components predominantly adopted by Simplified Chinese dictionaries published in mainland China.

== Evolution ==
Shang dynasty oracle bone script

Shang dynasty bronze script

Western Zhou bronze script

Spring and Autumn period bronze script

Warring States period bronze script

Chu slip and silk script

Qin slip script

Large seal script

Small seal script

十 is two crossed lines. It was originally a vertical line, a pictogram of a needle (now 針/针), later supplemented by a dot in the center of the stroke which became a short cross-stroke and expanded to the current shape.

== Derived characters ==
| Strokes | Characters |
|---|---|
| +0 | 十 |
| +1 | 卂 千 卄 |
| +2 | 卅 卆^{JP nonstandard} (=卒) 升 午 |
| +3 | 卉 半 |
| +4 | 卋 (=世 -> 一) 卌 卍 华^{SC} (=華 -> 艸) 协^{SC} (=協) 卐 毕^{SC} (=畢 -> 田) |
| +6 | 丧^{SC} (=喪 -> 口) 卑 卒 卓 協 单^{SC} (=單 -> 口) 卖^{SC} (=賣 -> 貝) |
| +7 | 南 |
| +8 | 単 |
| +9 | 卙 |
| +10 | 博 |
| +19 | 卛 颦^{SC} (=顰 -> 頁) |

== Literature ==
- Fazzioli, Edoardo (1987). Chinese calligraphy : from pictograph to ideogram : the history of 214 essential Chinese/Japanese characters. calligraphy by Rebecca Hon Ko. New York: Abbeville Press. ISBN 0-89659-774-1.
- Leyi Li: “Tracing the Roots of Chinese Characters: 500 Cases”. Beijing 1993, ISBN 978-7-5619-0204-2
- KangXi: page 155, character 17
- Dai Kanwa Jiten: character 2695
- Dae Jaweon: page 348, character 6
- Hanyu Da Zidian: volume 1, page 58, character 9

== See also ==
- Cross
