= Radical 200 =

Chinese character radical

麻
- Radical 200 (U+2FC7)
- 麻 (U+9EBB) "hemp, flax"

Pronunciations
- Pinyin: má
- Bopomofo: ㄇㄚˊ
- Wade–Giles: ma2
- Cantonese Yale: ma4
- Jyutping: maa4
- Japanese Kana: マ ma / バ ba (on'yomi) あさ asa (kun'yomi)
- Sino-Korean: 마 ma
- Hán-Việt: ma, mà, mơ

Names
- Japanese name(s): 麻/あさ asa 麻冠/あさかんむり asakanmuri
- Hangul: 삼 sam

Stroke order animation

Radical 200 or radical hemp (麻部) meaning "hemp" or "flax" is one of the 6 Kangxi radicals (214 radicals in total) composed of 11 strokes. Historically, it is the Chinese word for cannabis.

In the Kangxi Dictionary, there are 34 characters (out of 49,030) to be found under this radical.

麻 is also the 193rd indexing component in the Table of Indexing Chinese Character Components predominantly adopted by Simplified Chinese dictionaries published in mainland China.

== Evolution ==
Bronze script character

Large seal script character

Small seal script character

== Derived characters ==
| Strokes | Characters |
|---|---|
| +0 | 麻 |
| +3 | 麼 麽 (=麼) |
| +4 | 麾 |
| +7 | 麿 |
| +8 | 黀 |
| +9 | 黁 |
| +13 | 黂 (=𪎰) |

== Variant forms ==
Radical 200 in the Kangxi Dictionary

A variant form

Standard form in Traditional Chinese

Standard form in Japanese

Standard form in Simplified Chinese

== Sinogram ==
As an independent sinogram 麻 is a Jōyō kanji, or a kanji used in writing the Japanese language. It is a secondary school kanji. It is part of taima (大麻), a Japanese word for cannabis.

== See also ==
- List of jōyō kanji
- Jingu Taima

== Literature ==
- Fazzioli, Edoardo (1987). Chinese calligraphy : from pictograph to ideogram : the history of 214 essential Chinese/Japanese characters. calligraphy by Rebecca Hon Ko. New York: Abbeville Press. ISBN 0-89659-774-1.
- Lunde, Ken (Jan 5, 2009). "Appendix J: Japanese Character Sets" (PDF). CJKV Information Processing: Chinese, Japanese, Korean & Vietnamese Computing (Second ed.). Sebastopol, Calif.: O'Reilly Media. ISBN 978-0-596-51447-1.
