= Radical 98 =

Chinese character radical

瓦
- Radical 98 (U+2F61)
- 瓦 (U+74E6) "tile"

Pronunciations
- Pinyin: wǎ
- Bopomofo: ㄨㄚˇ
- Wade–Giles: wa3
- Cantonese Yale: ngáh
- Jyutping: ngaa5
- Japanese Kana: ガ ga (on'yomi) かわら kawara (kun'yomi)
- Sino-Korean: 와 wa

Names
- Chinese name(s): 瓦字旁 wǎzìpáng 瓦字底 wǎzìdǐ
- Japanese name(s): 瓦/かわら kawara
- Hangul: 기와 giwa

Stroke order animation

Radical 98, also known as the radical tile (瓦部) meaning "tile" is one of the 23 Kangxi radicals (out of a total of 214 radicals) and is composed of 5 strokes.

In the Kangxi Dictionary, there are 174 characters (out of 49,030) listed under this radical.

瓦 is also the 72nd indexing component in the Table of Indexing Chinese Character Components, predominantly adopted by Simplified Chinese dictionaries published in mainland China. In the simplified form (xin zixing), the radical is modified and consists of only 4 strokes, instead of the traditional 5-stroke form.

== Evolution ==
Chu slip and silk script

Large seal script character

Small seal script character

Han dynasty Clerical script

== Derived characters ==
Strokes	Characters
+0	瓦
+2	瓧
+3	瓨 瓩
+4	瓪 瓫 瓬 瓭 瓮 瓯 瓰 瓱 瓲
+5	瓳 瓴 瓵
+6	瓶 瓷 瓸
+7	瓹 瓺 瓻 瓼
+8	瓽 瓾 瓿 甀 甁
+9	甂 甃 甄 甅 甆
+10	甇 甈 甉
+11	甊 甋 甌 甍 甎 甏 甐 甑
+12	甒
+13	甓 甔 甕
+14	甖
+16	甗

== Sinogram ==
瓦 is a Jōyō kanji, or a kanji used in writing the Japanese language. It is a secondary school kanji.

== See also ==
- List of jōyō kanji

== Literature ==
- Fazzioli, Edoardo (1987). Chinese calligraphy : from pictograph to ideogram : the history of 214 essential Chinese/Japanese characters. calligraphy by Rebecca Hon Ko. New York: Abbeville Press. ISBN 0-89659-774-1.
- Lunde, Ken (Jan 5, 2009). "Appendix J: Japanese Character Sets" (PDF). CJKV Information Processing: Chinese, Japanese, Korean & Vietnamese Computing (Second ed.). Sebastopol, Calif.: O'Reilly Media. ISBN 978-0-596-51447-1.
