= Radical 75 =

Chinese character radical

木
- Radical 75 (U+2F4A)
- 木 (U+6728) "tree"

Pronunciations
- Pinyin: mù
- Bopomofo: ㄇㄨˋ
- Gwoyeu Romatzyh: muh
- Wade–Giles: mu^{4}
- Cantonese Yale: muhk
- Jyutping: muk6
- Pe̍h-ōe-jī: bo̍k
- Japanese Kana: モク moku / ボク boku (on'yomi) き ki (kun'yomi)
- Sino-Korean: 목 mok

Names
- Chinese name(s): (Left) 木字旁 mùzìpáng (Bottom) 木字底 mùzìdǐ
- Japanese name(s): 木偏 kihen
- Hangul: 나무 namu

Stroke order animation

Radical 75 or radical tree (木部), meaning "tree", is one of the 34 Kangxi radicals (214 radicals in total) composed of 4 strokes.

In the Kangxi Dictionary, there are 1,369 characters (out of 49,030) to be found under this radical.

木 is also the 64th indexing component in the Table of Indexing Chinese Character Components predominantly adopted by Simplified Chinese dictionaries published in mainland China, with its alternative form 朩 being its associated indexing component.

In the Chinese wuxing ("Five Phases"), 木 represents the element wood.

== Evolution ==
Kana ホ and ほ are from 保.

Oracle bone script

Bronze script

Chu slip and silk script

Large seal script

Small seal script

=== 未 (not yet; 8th earthly branch) ===
Compare 禾.

Shang dynasty oracle bone script

Western Zhou bronze script

Small seal script

=== 朱 (cinnabar; vermilion) ===
Shang dynasty oracle bone script

Western Zhou bronze script

Large seal script

Small seal script

=== 末 (tip, top) ===
Western Zhou bronze script

Large seal script

Small seal script

=== 本 (root) ===
Bronze script

Large seal script

Small seal script

=== 朮 ===
Hand (又) holding grain. Original character of 秫 (glutinous grain).

Shang dynasty oracle bone script

Chu slip and silk script

Qin slip script

Large seal script character

Small seal script character

== Derived characters ==
Strokes	Characters
+0	木 朩
+1	未 末 本 札 朮 术^{SC} (=術 -> 行 / 朮) 朰^{KO}
+2	朱 朲 朳 朴 (also SC/variant form of 樸) 朵 朶 (=朵) 朷 朸 朹 机 (also SC form of 機 / variant form of 几 -> 几) 朻 朼 朽 朾 朿 杀^{SC} (=殺 -> 殳) 杁^{JP} 杂^{SC} (=雜 -> 隹) 权^{SC} (=權)
+3	杄 杅 杆 杇 杈 杉 杊 杋 杌 杍 李 杏 材 村 杒 杓 杔 杕 杖 杗 杘 杙 杚 杛 杜 杝 杞 束 杠 条^{SC/JP} (=條) 杢 杣 杤^{JP nonstandard} (=栃) 杦 杧 杨^{SC} (=杨) 杩^{SC} (=榪) 来^{SC} (=來)
+4	杪 杫 杬 杭 杮 杯 杰^{SC/variant} (=傑 -> 人) 東 杲 杳 杴 杵 杶 杷 杸 杹 杺 杻 杼 杽 松 板 枀 (=松) 极 枂 枃 构 (SC form of 構; also variant form of 枸) 枅 枆 枇 枈 枉 枊 枋 枌 枍 枎 枏 (=柟) 析 枑 枒 枓 枔 枕 枖 林 枘 枙 枚 枛 果 枝 枞^{SC} (=樅) 枟 枠^{JP} 枢^{SC/JP} (=樞) 枣^{SC} (=棗) 枤 枥^{SC} (=櫪) 枦 (=櫨) 枧^{SC} (=梘) 枨^{SC} (=棖) 枩 (=松) 枪^{SC} (=槍) 枫^{SC} (=楓) 枬 枭^{SC} (=梟)
+5	枡 枮 枯 枰 枱^{HK} (=檯) 枲 枳 枴 枵 架 枷 枸 枹 枺 枻 枼 桒 枾 枿 柀 柁 柂 柃 柄 柅 柆 柇 柈 柉 柊 柋 柌 柍 柎 柏 某 柑 柒 染 柔 柕 柖 柗 柘 柙 柚 柛 柜 柝 柞 柟 柠^{SC} (=檸) 柡 柢 柣 柤 查 柦 柧 柨 柩 柪 柫 柬 柭 柮 柯 柰 柱 柲 柳 柴 柵 柶 柷 柸 柹 (=柿) 柺 査^{JP} (=查) 柼 柽^{SC} (=檉) 柾 柿 栀 栁 (=柳) 栂 栃^{JP} 栄^{JP} (=榮) 栅^{SC/variant} (=柵) 栆 (=棗) 标^{SC} (=標) 栈^{SC} (=棧) 栉^{SC} (=櫛) 栊^{SC} (=櫳) 栋^{SC} (=棟) 栌^{SC} (=櫨) 栍 栎^{SC} (=櫟) 栏^{SC} (=欄) 栐 树^{SC} (=樹)
+6	栒 栓 栔 栕 栖 (also SC form of 棲) 栗 栘 栙 栚 栛 栜 栝 栞 栟 栠 校 栢 栣 栤 栥 栦 栧 栨 栩 株 栫 栬 栭 栮 栯 栰 栱 栲 栳 栴 栵 栶 样 核 根 栺 栻 格 栽 栾^{SC} (=欒) 栿 桀 桁 桂 桃 桄 桅 框 桇 案 桉 桊 桋 桌 桍 桎 桏 桐 桑 桒 桓 桔 桕 桖 桗 桘 桙 桚 桛 桜^{JP} (=櫻) 桝 桞 桟^{JP} (=棧) 桠^{SC} (=椏) 桡^{SC} (=橈) 桢^{SC} (=楨) 档^{SC} (=檔) 桤^{SC} (=榿) 桥^{SC} (=橋) 桦^{SC} (=樺) 桧^{SC/JP} (=檜) 桨^{SC} (=槳) 桩^{SC} (=樁) 桪^{SC} (=樳) 梠^{SC variant}
+7	桫 桬 桭 桮 桯 桰 桱 桲 桳 桴 桵 桶 桷 桸 桹 桺 (=柳) 桻 桼 桽 桾 桿 梀 梁 梂 梃 梄 梅 梆 梇 梈 梉 梊 梋 梌 梍 梎 梏 梐 梑 梒 梓 梔 梕 梖 梗 梘 梙 梚 梛 梜 條 梞 梟 梠^{TC variant} 梡 梢 梣 梤 梥 梧 梨 梩 梪 梫 梬 梭 梮 梯 械 梱 梲 梳 梴 梵 梶 梷 梸 梹 梺 梻 梼^{SC} (=檮) 梽 梾^{SC} (=棶) 梿^{SC} (=槤) 检^{SC} (=檢) 棁^{SC/HK} (=梲) 棂^{SC} (=櫺)
+8	棃 棄 棅 棆 棇 棈 棉 棊 棋 棌 棍 棎 棏 棐 棑 棒 棓 棔 棕 棖 棗 棘 棙 棚 棛 棜 棝 棞 棟 棠 棡 棢 棣 棤 棥 棦 棧 棨 棩 棪 棫 棬 棭 森 棯 棰 棱 棲 棳 棴 棵 棶 棷 棸 棹 棺 棻 棼 棽 棾 棿 椀 椁 椂 椃 椄 椅 椆 椇 椈 椉 椊 椋 椌 植 椎 椏 椐 椑 椒 椓 椔 椕 椖 椗 椘 椙 椚 椛^{JP} 検^{JP} (=檢) 椝^{SC} (=槼=規 -> 見) 椞 椟^{SC} (=櫝) 椠^{SC} (=槧) 椡 椢^{SC/JP} (=槶) 椣 椤^{SC} (=欏) 椥 椦 椧^{KO} 椨 椩 椪 椫^{SC} (=樿) 椬 椭^{SC} (=橢) 椮^{SC} (=槮) 楇^{GB TC variant} 楉^{SC variant}
+9	椯 椰 椱 椲 椳 椴 椵 椶 (=棕) 椷 椸 椹 椺 椻 椼 椽 椾 椿 楀 楁 楂 楃 楄 楅 楆 楇^{Traditional variant} 楈 楉^{TC variant} 楊 楋 楌 楍 楎 楏 楐 楑 楒 楓 楔 楕 楖 楗 楘 楙 楚 楛 楜 楝 楞 楟 楠 楡^{Kangxi/JP} (=榆) 楢 楣 楤 楥 楦 楧 楨 楩 楪 楫 楬 業 楮 楯 楰 楱 楲 楳 楴 極 楶 楷 楸 楹 楺 楻 楼^{SC/JP} (=樓) 楽^{JP} (=樂) 楾 楿 榀 榁 榊^{JP} 榋 榌 榔 槌 概 榃 榄^{SC} (=欖) 榅^{SC/HK} (=榲) 榆 榇^{SC} (=櫬) 榈^{SC} (=櫚)
+10	榍 榎 榏 榐 榑 榒 榓 榕 榖 榗 榘 (=榘 -> 矢) 榙 榚 榛 榜 榝 榞 榟 榠 榡 榢 榣 榤 榥 榦 榧 榨 榩 榪 榫 榬 榭 榮 榯 榰 榱 榲 榳 榴 榵 榶 榷 榸 榹 榺 榻 榼 榽 榾 榿 槀 (=槁) 槁 槂 槃 槄 槅 槆 槇^{Kangxi} (=槙) 槈 槉 槊 構 槍 槎 槏 槐 槑 槒 槓 槔 槕 槖 槗 様^{JP} (=樣) 槙 槚^{SC} (=檟) 槛^{SC} (=檻) 槜 槝 槞^{JP} (=櫳) 槟^{SC} (=檳) 槠^{SC} (=櫧) 槡 樋 樮 﨔^{JP nonstandard} (=櫸)
+11	槢 槣 槤 槥 槦 槧 槨 槩 槪^{Kangxi} (=概) 槫 槬 槭 槮 槯 槰 槱 槲 槳 槴 槵 槶 槷 槸 槺 槻 槼 (=規 -> 見) 槽 槾 槿 樀 樁 樂 樃 樄 樅 樆 樇 樈 樉 樊 樌 樍 樎 樏 樐 樑 樒 樓 樔 樕 樖 樗 樘 標 樚 樛 樜 樝 樞 樟 樠 模 樢 樣 樤 樥 樦 樧 樨 権^{JP} (=權) 横^{SC/JP} (=橫) 樫 樬 樭 樯^{SC} (=檣) 樰 樱^{SC} (=櫻) 橴 橡^{SC variant}
+12	槹 (=槔) 樲 樳 樴 樵 樶 樷 (=叢 -> 又) 樸 樹 樺 樻 樼 樽 樾 樿 橀 橁 橂 橃 橄 橅 橆 (=無 -> 火) 橇 橈 橉 橊 (=榴) 橋 橌 橍 橎 橏 橐 橑 橒 橓 橔 橕 橖 橗 橘 橙 橚 橛 橜 (=橛) 橝 橞 機 橠 橡^{TC/JP variant} 橢 橣 橤 橥 橦 橧 橨 橩 橪 橫 橬 橭 橮 橯 橰 (=槔) 橱^{SC} (=櫥) 橲 橳^{JP} 橵 橶 橷 橸 橹^{SC} (=櫓) 橺 橻 橼^{SC} (=櫞) 檧^{SC variant} 檨^{SC variant}
+13	橽 橾 橿 檀 檁 檂 檃 檄 檅 檆 檇 檈 檉 檊 檋 檌 檍 檎 檏 檐 檑 檒 檓 檔 檕 檖 檗 檘 檙 檚 檛 檜 檝 檞 檟 檠 檡 檢 檣 檤 檥 檦 檧^{TC variant} 檨^{TC variant} 檩^{SC/variant} (=檁) 檪^{JP nonstandard} (=櫟) 櫛 檬^{SC variant}
+14	檫 檬^{TC variant} 檭 檮 檯 檰 檱 檲 檳 檴 檵 檶 檷 檸 檹 檺 檻 檼 檽 檾 檿 櫀 櫁 櫂 櫃 櫄 櫅 櫆 櫇 櫈 櫉 (=櫥) 櫊 櫔^{GB TC variant}
+15	櫋 櫌 櫍 櫎 櫏 櫐 櫑 櫒 櫓 櫔^{Traditional variant} 櫕 櫖 櫗 櫘 櫙 櫚 櫜 櫝 櫞 櫟 櫠 櫡 櫢 櫣 櫤 櫥 櫦 櫫 櫭
+16	櫧 櫨 櫩 櫪 櫬 櫮 櫯 櫰 櫱 櫲 櫳 櫴 櫵 櫶 欄
+17	櫸 櫹 櫺 櫻 櫼 櫽 櫾 櫿 欀 欁 欂 欃 欌
+18	櫷 欅^{JP old} (=櫸) 欆 欇 欈 欉 權 欋 欍 欎 (=鬱 -> 鬯)
+19	欏 欐 欑 欒
+20	欓 欔 欕| 欗^{GB TC variant}
+21	欖 欗^{Traditional variant} 欘 欙 欚 欛 欜 欝
+24	欞 (=櫺)
+25	欟

== Sinogram ==
As an isolated character it is one of the kyōiku kanji or kanji taught in elementary school in Japan. It is a first grade kanji. It is present in the name of Japan in the Japanese language (日本, Nippon) meaning "Origin of the Sun".

== Literature ==
- Fazzioli, Edoardo (1987). Chinese Calligraphy: From Pictograph to Ideogram: The History of 214 Essential Chinese/Japanese Characters. Calligraphy by Rebecca Hon Ko. New York: Abbeville Press. ISBN 0-89659-774-1.
- Lunde, Ken (Jan 5, 2009). "Appendix J: Japanese Character Sets" (PDF). CJKV Information Processing: Chinese, Japanese, Korean & Vietnamese Computing (Second ed.). Sebastopol, Calif.: O'Reilly Media. ISBN 978-0-596-51447-1.
