= Radical 86 =

Chinese character radical

火
- Radical 86 (U+2F55)
- 火 (U+706B) "fire"

Pronunciations
- Pinyin: huǒ
- Bopomofo: ㄏㄨㄛˇ
- Gwoyeu Romatzyh: huoo
- Wade–Giles: huo^{3}
- Cantonese Yale: fó
- Jyutping: fo2
- Pe̍h-ōe-jī: hó͘ⁿ
- Japanese Kana: カ ka コ ko (on'yomi) ひ hi (kun'yomi)
- Sino-Korean: 화 hwa

Names
- Chinese name(s): (Left) 火字旁 huǒzìpáng (灬) 四點底/四点底 sìdiǎndǐ
- Japanese name(s): 火/ひ hi (Left) 火偏/ひへん hihen れんが renga (灬) 列火/れっか rekka
- Hangul: 불 bul (灬) 연화발 yeonhwabal

Stroke order animation

Radical 86 or radical fire (火部) meaning "fire" is one of the 34 Kangxi radicals (214 radicals in total) composed of 4 strokes.

In the Kangxi Dictionary, there are 639 characters (out of 49,030) to be found under this radical.

In the Chinese wuxing ("Five Phases"), 火 represents the element Fire. In Taoist cosmology, 火 (Fire) is the nature component of the bagua diagram 離 Lí.

火 is also the 95th indexing component in the Table of Indexing Chinese Character Components predominantly adopted by Simplified Chinese dictionaries published in mainland China, with 灬 being its associated indexing component.

== Evolution ==
Unrelated to 人 and 大.

Oracle bone script

Oracle bone script variant

Western Zhou bronze script

Western Zhou bronze script variant

Spring and Autumn period bronze script

Chu slip and silk script

Qin slip script

Large seal script

Small seal script

== Derived characters ==
Strokes	Characters
+0	火 灬
+1	灭^{SC} (=滅 -> 水)
+2	灮 灯^{SC/JP} (=燈) 灰^{SC/TC}/灰^{JP} 灱 灲 灳
+3	灴 灵^{SC} (=靈 -> 雨) 灶 灷 灸 灹 灺 灻 灼 災 灾^{SC/TC variant} (=災) 灿^{SC} (=燦) 炀^{SC} (=煬)
+4	炁 (=氣 -> 气) 炂 炃 炄 炅 炆 炇 炈 炉^{SC}/炉^{JP} (=爐) 炊 炋 炌 炍 炎 炏 炐 炑 炒 炓 炔 炕 炖 炗 (=光 -> 儿) 炘 炙 炚 炛 (=光) 炜^{SC} (=煒) 炝^{SC} (=熗) 炞
+5	炟 炠 炡 炢 炣 炤 炥 炦 炧 炨 炩 炪 炫 炬 炭^{SC/TC}/炭^{JP} 炮 炯 炰 炱 炲 (=炱) 炳 炴 炵 炶 炷 炸 点^{SC/JP} (=點 -> 黑) 為 炻 炼^{SC} (=煉) 炽^{SC} (=熾) 炾 炿 (=烐) 烀 烁^{SC} (=爍) 烂^{SC} (=爛) 烃^{SC} (=烴)
+6	烄 烅 烆 烇 烈 烉 (=煥) 烊 烋 烌 烍 烎 烏 烐 烑 烒 烓 烔 烕 烖 烗 烘 烙 烚 烛^{SC} (=燭) 烜 烝 烞 烟 (=煙) 烠 烡 (=光) 烢 烣 烤 烥 (=炬) 烦^{SC} (=煩) 烧^{SC} (=燒) 烨^{SC} (=燁) 烩^{SC} (=燴) 烪 烫^{SC} (=燙) 烬^{SC} (=燼) 热^{SC} (=熱) 烮 (=烈) 焒^{SC variant}
+7	烯 烰 烱 烲 烳 烴 烵 烶 烷 烸 烹 烺 烻 烼 烽 烾 烿 焀 焁 焂 焃 焄 焅 焆 焇 焈 焉 焊 焋 焌 焍 焎 焏 焐 焑 焒^{TC variant} 焓 焔^{JP} (=焰) 焕^{SC} (=煥) 焖^{SC} (=燜) 焗 焘^{SC} (=燾) 焫^{SC variant}
+8	焙 焚 焛 焜 焝 焞 焟 焠 無 焢 焣 焤 焥 焦 焧 焨 焩 焪 焫^{TC variant} 焬 焭 焮 焯 焰 焱 焲 焳 焴 焵 然 焷 焸 焹 焺 焻 焼^{JP} (=燒) 焽 焾 焿 煀 煁 煂 煃 煄 煅 煈 煉 煜 煮 煐^{SC variant}
+9	煆 煇 煊 煋 煌 煍 煎 煏 煐^{TC variant} 煑 (=煮) 煒 煓 煔 煕 (=熙) 煖 煗 煘 煙 煚 煝 煞 煟 煠 煡 煢 煣 煤 煥 煦 照 煨 煩 煪 煫 煬 煭 煯 煰 煱 煲 煳 煴^{SC/HK} (=熅) 煵 煶 煷 煸 煺^{SC variant} 熙 熍^{SC variant}
+10	煺^{TC variant} 煹 煻 煼 煽 煾 煿 熀 熁 熂 熃 熄 熅 熆 熇 熈 (=熙) 熉 熊 熋 熌 熍^{TC variant} 熎 熏 熐 熑 熒 熓 熔 熕 熖 熗 熘 燁^{GB TC variant}
+11	熚 熛 熜 熝 熞 熟 熠 熡 熢 熣 熤 熥 熦 熧 熨 熩 熪 熫 熬 熭 熮 熯 熰 熱 熲 熳 熴 熵 熿^{SC variant}
+12	熶 熷 熸 熹 熺 熻 熼 熽 熾 熿^{TC variant} 燀 燁^{Traditional variant} 燂 燃 燄 (=焰) 燅 燆 燇 燈 燉 燊 燋 燌 燍 燎 燏 燐 燑 燒 燓 燔 燕 燖 燗 燘 燙 燚 燛 (=煚) 燜 燝 燞 燠^{SC variant}
+13	營 燠^{TC variant} 燡 燢 燣 燤 燥 燦 燧 燨 燩 燪 燫 燬 燭 燮 燯 燰 燱 燲 燳 燴 燵 燶 燷^{SC/TC variant} (=燣)
+14	燸 燹 燺 燻 燼 燽 燾 燿 爀 爁 爂 爃 爄^{GB TC variant} 爇^{SC variant} 爌^{GB TC variant} 爗^{GB TC variant}
+15	爄^{Traditional variant} 爅 爆 爇^{TC variant} 爈 爉 爊 爋 (=熏) 爌^{Traditional variant} 爍 爎 爕 爑^{SC variant}
+16	爏 爐 爑^{TC variant} 爒 爓 爔 爖 爗^{Traditional variant} 爘 爟^{GB TC variant}
+17	爙 爚 爛
+18	爜 爝 爞 爟^{Traditional variant} 爠
+19	爡^{Traditional variant} 爢
+20	爣 爤^{GB TC variant}
+21	爤^{Traditional variant} 爥 爦
+24	爧
+25	爨
+29	爩

== Sinogram ==
It also exists as an independent Chinese character. It is one of the kyōiku kanji or kanji taught in elementary school in Japan. It is taught in first grade.
