= Radical 96 =

Chinese character radical

玉
- Radical 96 (U+2F5F)
- 玉 (U+7389) "jade"

Pronunciations
- Pinyin: yù
- Bopomofo: ㄩˋ
- Gwoyeu Romatzyh: yuh
- Wade–Giles: yü^{4}
- Cantonese Yale: yuhk
- Jyutping: juk6
- Japanese Kana: ギョク gyoku / ゴク goku (on'yomi) たま tama (kun'yomi)
- Sino-Korean: 옥 ok

Names
- Chinese name(s): (⺩) 玉字旁 yùzìpáng (Bottom) 玉字底 yùzìdǐ (⺩) 王字旁 wángzìpáng (⺩) 提玉旁 tíyùpáng (⺩) 斜王旁 xiéwángpáng
- Japanese name(s): 玉/たま tama (⺩) 玉偏/たまへん tamahen (⺩) 玉偏/ぎょくへん gyokuhen (⺩) 王偏/おうへん ōhen
- Hangul: 구슬 guseul

Stroke order animation

Stroke order in Japanese

Radical 96 or radical jade (玉部) meaning "jade" is one of the 23 Kangxi radicals (214 radicals in total) composed of 5 strokes.

When appearing at the left side of a Chinese character, the radical transforms into ⺩ consisting of four strokes.

In the Kangxi Dictionary, there are 473 characters (out of 49,030) to be found under this radical.

The variant form of this radical, 王, is used as the 61st indexing component in the Table of Indexing Chinese Character Components predominantly adopted by Simplified Chinese dictionaries published in mainland China, while its original form 玉, along with the left component variant ⺩, are listed as its associated indexing components.

== Evolution ==
=== 玉 (jade) ===
Pictogram of cóng (琮). Historically very similar to 王.

Shang dynasty Oracle bone script

Shang dynasty Bronze script

Western Zhou Bronze script

Spring and Autumn period bronze script

Warring States period bronze script

Chu slip and silk script

Qin slip script

Shuowen ancient script

Large seal script

Small seal script

Qing dynasty Clerical script

=== 王 (king) ===
A ritual axe. Compare 士, 立.

Shang dynasty Oracle bone script

Shang dynasty Oracle bone script variant

Shang dynasty Oracle bone script variant

Shang dynasty Bronze script

Western Zhou Bronze script

Western Zhou Bronze script variant

Spring and Autumn period bronze script

Warring States period bronze script

Chu slip and silk script

Qin slip script

Shuowen ancient script

Large seal script

Small seal script

=== 主 ===
Means "master". Oracle bone same as 示.

Shang dynasty Oracle bone script

Western Zhou Bronze script

Small seal script

== Derived characters ==
Strokes	Characters
+0	玉 玊 王
+1	玌 玍
+2	玎 玏 玐 玑^{SC} (=璣)
+3	玒 玓 玔 玕 玖 玗 玘 玙^{SC} (=璵) 玚^{SC} (=瑒) 玛^{SC} (=瑪)
+4	玜 玝 玞 玟 玠 玡 玢 玣 玤 玥 玦 玧 玨 玩 玪 玫 玬 玭 玮^{SC} (=瑋) 环^{SC} (=環) 现^{SC} (=現) 玱^{SC} (=瑲)
+5	玲^{SC}/玲^{TC}/玲^{JP} 玳 玴 玵 玶 玷 玸 玹 玺^{SC} (=璽) 玻 玼 玽 玾 玿 珀 珁 珂 珃 珄 珅 珆 珇 珈 珉 珊^{SC}/珊^{TC/JP} 珋 珌 珍 珎 珏 珐 珑^{SC} (=瓏)
+6	珒 珓 珔 珕 珖 珗 珘 珙 珚 珛 珜 珝 珞 珟 珠 珡 珢 珣 珤 珥 珦 珧 珨 珩 珪 珫 珬 班 珮 珯 珰^{SC} (=璫) 珱^{JP nonstandard} (=瓔) 珲^{SC} (=琿) 琤^{SC variant}
+7	珳 珴 珵 珶 珷 珸 珹 珺 珻 珼 珽 現 珿 琀 琁 琂 球 琄 琅 理 琇 琈 琉 琊 琋 琌 琍 琎^{SC} (=璡) 琏^{SC} (=璉) 琐^{SC} (=瑣) 琑 琒 琓 琷^{SC variant}
+8	琔 琕 琖 琗 琘 琙 琚 琛 琜 琝 琞 琟 琠 琡 琢 琮 琯 琰 琱 琲 琳 琴 琺 琣 琤^{TC variant} 琥 琦 琧 琨 琩 琪 琫 琬 琭 琵 琶 琷^{TC variant} 琸 琹 (=琴) 琻 琼^{SC} (=瓊) 瑛^{SC/JP variant}
+9	琽 琾 琿 瑀 瑁 瑂 瑃 瑄 瑅 瑆 瑇 瑈 瑉 瑊 瑋 瑌 瑍 瑎 瑏 瑐 瑑 瑒 瑓 瑔 瑕 瑖 瑗 瑘 瑙 瑚 瑛^{TC variant} 瑜 瑝 瑞 瑟 瑶^{SC} (=瑤) 瑳^{SC variant} 瑥^{SC/HK variant} 瑵^{SC variant}
+10	瑠 瑡 瑢 瑣 瑤 瑥^{TC variant} 瑦 瑧 瑨^{SC}/瑨^{TC/JP} 瑩 瑪 瑫 瑬 瑭 瑮 瑯 瑰 瑱 瑲 瑳^{TC/JP variant} 瑴 瑵^{TC variant} 瑷^{SC} (=璦) 瑸^{SC} (=璸) 璍^{GB TC variant}
+11	瑹 瑺 瑻 瑼 瑽 瑾 瑿 璀 璁 璂 璃 璄 璅 璆 璇 璈 璉 璊 璋 璌 璎^{SC} (=瓔) 璓^{SC variant} 璜^{SC variant}
+12	璓^{TC variant} 璍^{Traditional variant} 璏 璐 璑 璒 璔 璕 璖 璗 璘 璙 璚 璛 璜^{TC variant} 璝 璞 璟 璠 璡 璢 (=瑠) 璣 璤
+13	璥 璦 璧 璨 璩 璪 璫 璬 璭 璮 璯 環 璱 璲 璳 璴
+14	璵 璶 璷 璸 璹 璺 璻 璼 璽 璾 璿 瓀 瓁 瓂
+15	瓃 瓄 瓅 瓆 瓇 瓈 瓉 瓊 瓋
+16	瓌 瓍 瓎 瓏 瓐 瓑 瓒^{SC} (=瓚)
+17	瓓 瓔 瓕 瓖
+18	瓗 瓘 瓙
+19	瓚
+20	瓛

== Sinogram ==
The radical is also used as an independent Chinese character. It is one of the Kyōiku kanji or Kanji taught in elementary school in Japan. It is a first grade kanji.

== Literature ==
- Fazzioli, Edoardo (1987). Chinese calligraphy : from pictograph to ideogram : the history of 214 essential Chinese/Japanese characters. calligraphy by Rebecca Hon Ko. New York: Abbeville Press. ISBN 0-89659-774-1.
- Lunde, Ken (Jan 5, 2009). "Appendix J: Japanese Character Sets" (PDF). CJKV Information Processing: Chinese, Japanese, Korean & Vietnamese Computing (Second ed.). Sebastopol, Calif.: O'Reilly Media. ISBN 978-0-596-51447-1.
