= Small seal script =

Form of Chinese characters from the Qin dynasty

Small seal script 小篆
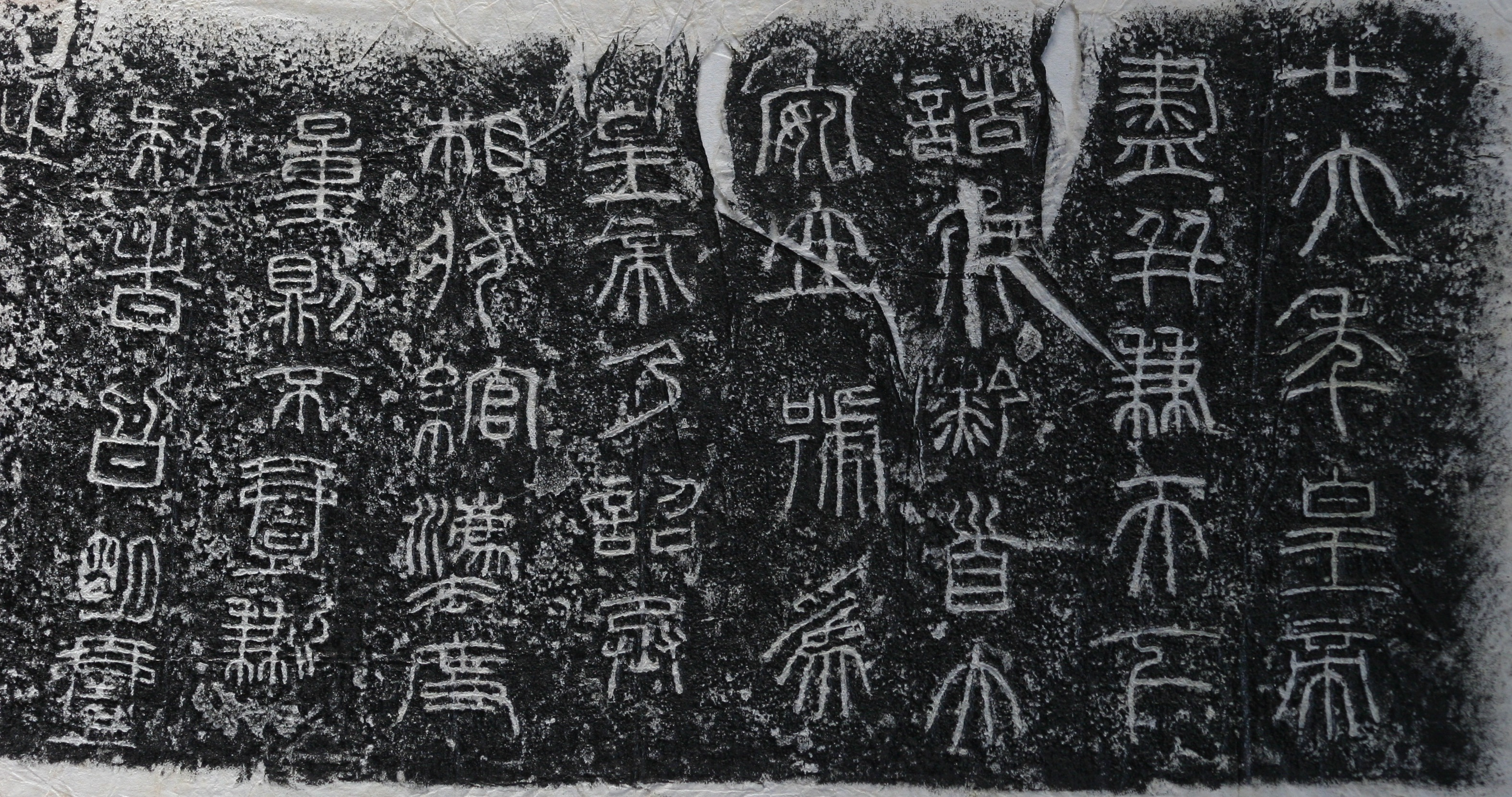
- Script type: Logographic
- Period: c. 500 BC – c. 200 AD
- Languages: Old Chinese

Related scripts
- Parent systems: (Proto-writing): Oracle bone script; Bronze script; Large seal script; Small seal script
- Child systems: Clerical script

ISO 15924
- ISO 15924: Seal (590), (Small) Seal

Unicode
- Unicode alias: Seal
- Unicode range: U+3D000–U+3FC3F

Small seal script

Chinese name
- Chinese: 小篆
- Literal meaning: small seal
Transcriptions
Standard Mandarin
- Hanyu Pinyin: xiǎozhuàn
- Wade–Giles: hsiao^{3}-chuan^{4}
Yue: Cantonese
- Jyutping: siu2 syun6

Qin script
- Chinese: 秦篆
- Literal meaning: Qin seal
Transcriptions
Standard Mandarin
- Hanyu Pinyin: Qínzhuàn
- Wade–Giles: Chʻin^{2}-chuan^{4}
Yue: Cantonese
- Jyutping: Ceon4 syun6

Vietnamese name
- Vietnamese: Tiểu triện
- Chữ Hán: 小篆

The small seal script is an archaic script style of written Chinese. It developed within the state of Qin during the Eastern Zhou dynasty (771–256 BC), and was then promulgated across China in order to replace script varieties used in other ancient Chinese states following Qin's wars of unification and establishment of the Qin dynasty (221–206 BC) under Qin Shi Huang, the first emperor of China.

== History ==
During the Eastern Zhou dynasty (c. 771 – 256 BC), local varieties of Chinese character forms had developed across the country, producing the 'scripts of the six states' (六國文字)—which were later collectively referred to as large seal script. This variance was considered unacceptable by the rising Qin dynasty (221–206 BC), who saw it as a hindrance to timely communication, trade, taxation, and transportation, as well as being a potential vector for fomenting political dissent. Around 220 BC, Qin Shi Huang ordered a systematic standardization of the country's weights, measures, and currency, as well as its writing system. Character forms which differed from those used by Qin scribes were discarded, with the Qin forms becoming standard across the entire empire.

== Standardization ==
The standardized use of small seal characters was promulgated via the Cangjiepian primer compiled by Qin Shi Huang's ministers—namely his chancellor Li Si. This compilation, which was claimed to include 3,300 characters, is no longer extant, and is known only through Chinese commentaries over the centuries. Several hundred characters from fragmented commentaries were collected during the Qing dynasty (1644–1912), and recent archeological excavations in Anhui have uncovered several hundred more on bamboo strips, showing the order of the characters. However, the script found was not the small seal script, as the discovery dates back to the Han period.

== Encoding ==
The small seal script was initially proposed for inclusion in Unicode in 2015. The 723-page proposal lists many of the best-known examples of Qing-era commentary images. After several revisions of this proposal, the Unicode Technical Committee accepted the script to be included in Unicode version 18.0. It is available in the block Small Seal (Unicode block).
