= Sino-Korean vocabulary =

Korean words of Chinese origin

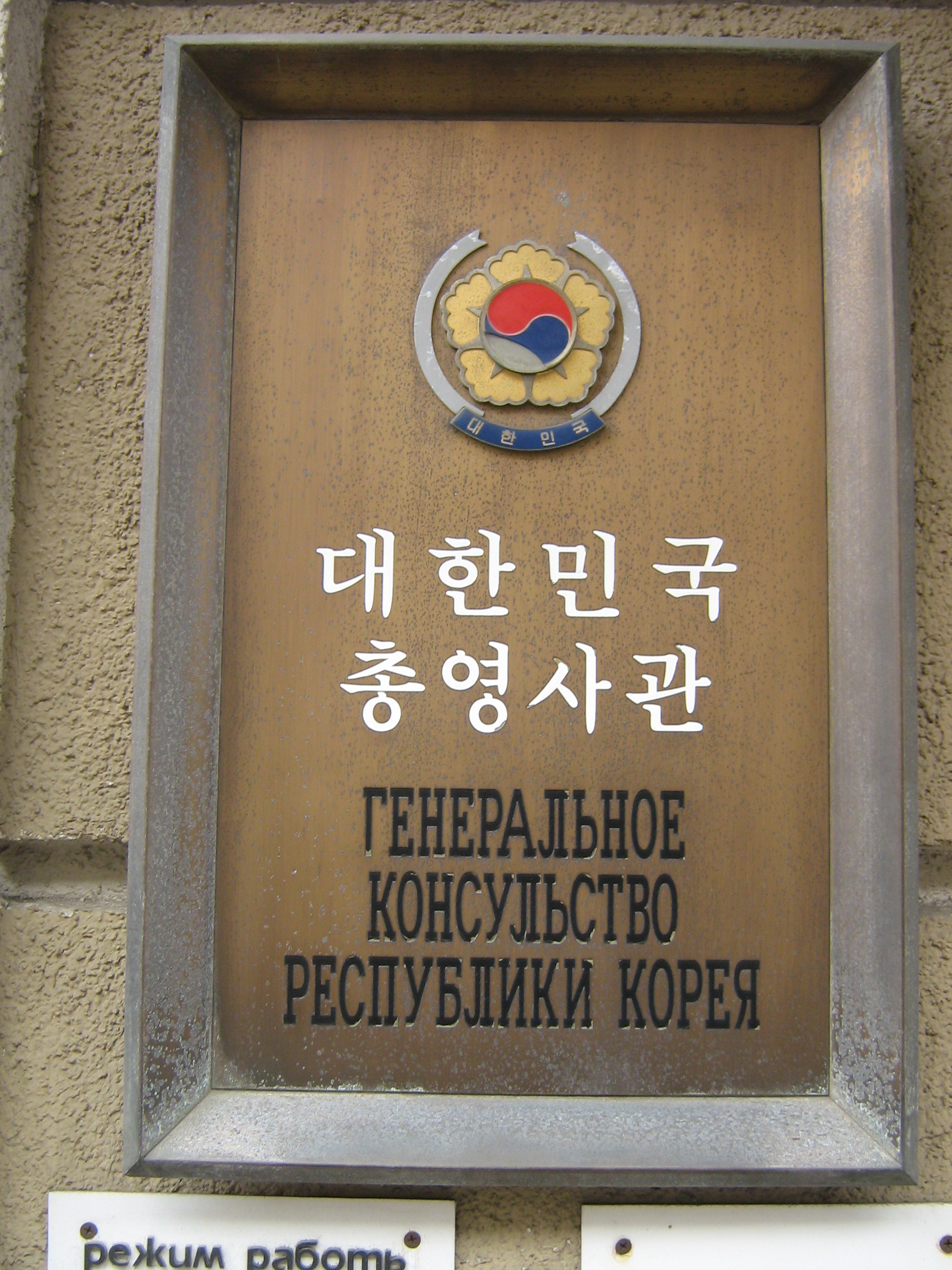
The plaque of General Consulate of Republic of Korea in Saint Petersburg, Russia; here the word 'Republic of Korea' (Korean: 대한민국; Hanja: 大韓民國) and 'General Consulate' (Korean: 총영사관; Hanja: 總領事館) are both Sino-Korean words

Sino-Korean vocabulary or Hanjaeo (Korean: 한자어; Hanja: 漢字語) refers to Korean words of Chinese origin. Sino-Korean vocabulary includes words borrowed directly from Chinese, as well as new Korean words created from Chinese characters, and words borrowed from Sino-Japanese vocabulary. Many of these terms were borrowed during the height of Chinese-language literature on Korean culture. Subsequently, many of these words have also been truncated or altered for the Korean language.

Estimates of the percentage of Sino-Korean ranges from as low as 30% to as high as 70%. According to the Standard Korean Language Dictionary published by the National Institute of Korean Language (NIKL), Sino-Korean represents approximately 57% of the Korean vocabulary.

== History ==
The use of Classical and Literary Chinese and Chinese characters in Korea dates back to at least 194 BCE. While Sino-Korean words were widely used during the Three Kingdoms period, they became even more popular during the Silla period. During this time, male aristocrats changed their given names to Sino-Korean names. Additionally, the government changed all official titles and place names in the country to Sino-Korean.

Sino-Korean words remained popular during the Goryeo and Joseon periods. Ultimately, the majority of Sino-Korean words were introduced before 1945, including Sino-Japanese words themselves that were introduced to Korea during Japanese Occupation. Right after the occupation ended, many South Korean intellectuals made suggestions for native Korean replacements of borrowed terms, especially those of Japanese origin, but also some of Sino-Korean origin too. Similarly, the North Korean government called for many Sino-Korean words to be replaced by native Korean terms. In the 21st century, Sino-Korean vocabulary has continued to grow in South Korea, where the meanings of Chinese characters are used to coin new words in Korean that did not exist in Classical and Literary Chinese and do not exist in modern Sinitic languages.

== Usage ==
Sino-Korean words constitute a large portion of South Korean vocabulary, the remainder being native Korean words and loanwords from other languages, such as Japanese and English to a lesser extent. Sino-Korean words are typically used in formal or literary contexts, and to express abstract or complex ideas.

All Korean surnames and most Korean given names are Sino-Korean. Additionally, Korean numerals can be expressed with Sino-Korean and native Korean words, though each set of numerals has different purposes.

Sino-Korean words may be written either in the Korean alphabet, known as Hangul, or in Chinese characters, known as Hanja.

== Examples ==
=== Words borrowed from Chinese ===
Sino-Korean words borrowed directly from Chinese come mainly from Chinese classics, literature, and colloquial Chinese.

Word	Korean (RR)	Hanja	Hanja meaning	Ref	Remarks
peace; tranquility; wellness	안녕 (annyeong)	安寧	"tranquil peace"		Colloquially often used as a form of greeting. For example, annyeonghaseyo (Korean: 안녕하세요; Hanja: 安寧하세요; lit. '"hello"') from annyeong (Korean: 안녕; Hanja: 安寧; lit. '"peace; tranquillity; wellness"') + haseyo (Korean: 하세요; lit. '"to do (casual polite)"').
birthday	생일 (saengil)	生日	"birth day"		
happiness; good fortune	행복 (haengbok)	幸福	"happiness blessing"		
parents	부모 (bumo)	父母	"father mother"		
student	학생 (haksaeng)	學生	"study student"		
sun	태양 (taeyang)	太陽	"great light"		
question	질문 (jilmun)	質問	"background ask"		
perfume	향수 (hyangsu)	香水	"fragrant water"		

=== Words created in Korea using Chinese characters ===
These words below were created in Korea using Chinese characters. They are not used in China, Japan, nor Vietnam.

Definition	Korean	Revised Romanization	Hanja	Remark
shame	미안	mian	未安	Colloquially often used to express shame, sorrow or as a form of apology. For example, mianhamnida (Korean: 미안합니다; Hanja: 未安합니다; lit. '"I am sorry"') from mian (Korean: 미안; Hanja: 未安; lit. '"shame"') + hamnida (Korean: 합니다; lit. '"to do (formal polite)"').
false; rumor; canard	낭설	nangseol	浪說	
marital compatibility; well-suited; well-matched	궁합	gunghap	宮合	
common cold	감기	gamgi	感氣	
deceptive; trickster	고단수	godansu	高段數	
hardship; trouble; suffering	고생	gosaeng	苦生	
notebook	공책	gongchaek	空冊	
amazing	굉장	goengjang	宏壯	
determiner (grammar); prenoun	관형사	gwanhyeongsa	冠形詞	
prison; penitentiary	교도소	gyodoso	矯導所	
assortment (of goods)	구색	gusaek	具色	
a joke	농담	nongdam	弄談	
unity; join; combine	단합	danhap	團合	
reply; response; answer	답장	dapjang	答狀	
fortune; lucky	다행	dahaeng	多幸	
cod(fish)	대구	daegu	大口	
mass transportation; public transit	대중교통	daejung-gyotong	大衆交通	
site; land mass	대지	daeji	垈地	
indebtedness	덕분	deokbun	德分	
subcontract	도급	dogeup	都給	
unmarried young man; bachelor; youngster	도령	doryeong	道令	
flu; influenza	독감	dokgam	毒感	
same age	동갑	donggap	同甲	
sense of kinship	동질감	dongjilgam	同質感	
beer	맥주	maekju	麥酒	
pollock	명태	myeongtae	明太	
(national) holiday	명절	myeongjeol	名節	
business card containing name	명함	myeongham	名銜	
carpenter	목수	moksu	木手	
extinction; annihilation	몰사	molsa	沒死	
massacre; slaughter; extermination	몰살	molsal	沒殺	
hibiscus	무궁화	mugunghwa	無窮花	
visit to sick person	문병	munbyeong	問病	
questioning; interrogating	문초	muncho	問招	
uneasy; uncomfortable; to be apologetic	미안	mian	未安	
public harm	민폐	minpye	民弊	
just	방금	banggeum	方今	
sitting cushion; sitting mat	방석	bangseok	方席	
lottery ticket	복권	bokgwon	福券	
real estate agency	복덕방	bokdeokbang	福德房	
off-season; slow season	비수기	bisugi	非需期	
ice rink	빙상장	bingsangjang	氷上場	
subscribe	구독	gudog	購讀	
cemetery; grave; tomb	산소	sanso	山所	
fish (specifically prepared as food)	생선	saengseon	生鮮	
stonemason	석수	seoksu	石手	
present; gift	선물	seonmul	膳物	
peak season; busy season	성수기	seongsugi	盛需期	
(your) name	성함	seongham	姓銜	
effort	수고	sugo	受苦	
sexual harassment	성희롱	seonghuirong	性戲弄	
duty; responsibility; task	소임	soim	所任	
precious; valuable	소중	sojung	所重	
trip; picnic; excursion	소풍	sopung	逍風	
cheque	수표	supyo	手票	
beginning of; start of; embark upon	시작	sijak	始作	
earnestly request	신신당부	sinsindangbu	申申當付	
child actor or actress	아역	ayeok	兒役	
seize; distrainment; sequestration	압류	amnyu (apryu)	押留	
bad term; grudge	앙숙	angsuk	怏宿	
uproar; clamor; commotion	야단	yadan	惹端	
socks	양말	yangmal	洋襪	
heartlessness; mercilessness	야박	yabak	野薄	
as expected; also	역시	yeoksi	亦是	
yellow-green; light green	연두	yeondu	軟豆	
alien; extraterrestrial	외계인	oegyein	外界人	
native speaker	원어민	woneomin	原語民	
exclave	월경지	wolgyeongji	越境地	
beginning; commencing	위시	wisi	爲始	
lean on; depend on; rely on	의지	uiji	依支	
move; relocate	이사	isa	移徙	
rice-planting machine	이앙기	ianggi	移秧機	
behalf	자기편	jagipyeon	自己便	
determination; decision; plan	작정	jakjeong	作定	
gloves; mittens	장갑	janggap	掌匣 / 掌甲	
lease; charter	전세	jeonse	專貰	
procedure (for); process (of); steps; proceedings	절차	jeolcha	節次	
lovers' talk	정담	jeongdam	情談	
identity	정체성	jeongcheseong	正體性	
bakery; bakeshop	제과점	jegwajeom	製菓店	
gas station	주유소	juyuso	注油所	
kettle	주전자	jujeonja	酒煎子	
sorry; pardon; regrettable	죄송	joesong	罪悚	
purse; wallet	지갑	jigap	紙匣	
order; turn; table of contents	차례	charye	次例	
bookstore	책방	chaekbang	冊房	
window	창문	changmun	窓門	
ceiling	천장	cheonjang	天障	
wedding invitation	청첩장	cheongcheopjang	請牒狀	
elementary school	초등학교	chodeung-hakgyo	初等學校	
elementary school student	초등학생	chodeung-haksaeng	初等學生	
spring fatigue	춘곤증	chungonjeung	春困症	
release; launch	출시	chulsi	出市	
stairs; stairway; staircase	층계	cheunggye	層階	
friend	친구	chingu	親舊	
release	출시	chulsi	出市	video game related
block	차단	chadang	遮斷	
spring of clock; clockwork	태엽	taeyeop	胎葉	
consilience	통섭	tongseop	統攝	
convenience store	편의점	pyeoneuijeom	便宜店	
letter; epistle	편지	pyeonji	便紙	
a visit; a trip; travelling	행차	haengcha	行次	
brag; bluff; boast	허풍	heopung	虛風	
cash	현찰	hyeonchal	現札	
circumstances; conditions	형편	hyeongpyeon	形便	
go crazy; be out of one's mind	환장	hwanjang	換腸	
change of seasons; in-between seasons	환절기	hwanjeolgi	換節期	
Hyeonchungil	현충일	hyeonchungil	顯忠日	
device	기기	gigi	機器/器機	Does not share the same meaning in Chinese, which means machine.
name card	명함	myeongham	名銜	

=== Words borrowed from Sino-Japanese ===
Sino-Korean words borrowed from Sino-Japanese are used only in Korean and Japanese, not in Chinese.

Word	Hangul (RR)	Hanja	Hanja meaning	Ref
airplane	비행기 (bihaenggi)	飛行機	"fly go machine"	
movie	영화 (yeonghwa)	映畵	"shine picture"	
item of personal preference	기호품 (gihopum)	嗜好品	"like items"	
actor	배우 (baeu)	俳優	"show actor"	
broadcast	방송 (bangsong)	放送	"put send"	
passport	여권 (yeogwon)	旅券	"travel certificate"	
station	역 (yeok)	驛	"station"	
photo	사진 (sajin)	寫眞	"write real"	

== Phonetic correspondences ==
=== Initial consonants ===
Correspondences of initial consonants
	Middle Chinese	Sino-Korean
Labials	幫 p	p/pʰ (Note: In early prescriptive dictionaries, Middle Chinese aspirates always yield Sino-Korean aspirates, but in actual pronunciation aspiration is unpredictable.)
Labials	滂 pʰ	p/pʰ
Labials	並 b	p/pʰ
Labials	明 m	m
Dentals	端 t	t/tʰ (Note: In Modern Sino-Korean, dentals [t]/[tʰ] preceding a palatal approximant [j] become palatalized as [tɕ]/[tɕʰ], respectively, e.g. 田: ttyen > cen, 定: ttyeng > ceng.)
Dentals	透 tʰ	t/tʰ
Dentals	定 d	t/tʰ
Dentals	泥 n	n
Dentals	來 l	l
Retroflex stops	知 ʈ	t/tʰ
Retroflex stops	徹 ʈʰ	t/tʰ
Retroflex stops	澄 ɖ	t/tʰ
Dental sibilants	精 ts	tɕ/tɕʰ
Dental sibilants	清 tsʰ	tɕ/tɕʰ
Dental sibilants	從 dz	tɕ/tɕʰ
Dental sibilants	心 s	s
Dental sibilants	邪 z	s
Retroflex sibilants	莊 ʈʂ	tɕ/tɕʰ
Retroflex sibilants	初 ʈʂʰ	tɕ/tɕʰ
Retroflex sibilants	崇 ɖʐ	s/tɕ/tɕʰ
Retroflex sibilants	生 ʂ	s
Palatals	章 tɕ	tɕ/tɕʰ
Palatals	昌 tɕʰ	tɕ/tɕʰ
Palatals	禪 dʑ	s
Palatals	書 ɕ	s
Palatals	船 ʑ	s
Palatals	日 ɲ	z > ∅
Velars	見 k	k/h
Velars	溪 kʰ	k/h
Velars	群 ɡ	k
Velars	疑 ŋ	ŋ > ∅
Laryngeals	影 ʔ	ʔ > ∅
Laryngeals	曉 x	h
Laryngeals	匣 ɣ	h

=== Final consonants ===
The Middle Chinese final consonants were semivowels (or glides) /j/ and /w/, nasals /m/, /n/ and /ŋ/, and stops /p/, /t/ and /k/. Sino-Korean preserves all the distinctions between final nasals and stops. Although Old Korean had a /t/ coda, words with the Middle Chinese coda /t/ have /l/ in Sino-Korean, reflecting a northern variety of Late Middle Chinese in which final /t/ had weakened to /r/.

Correspondences of final consonants
Middle Chinese	Sino-Korean
-m	m
-n	n
-ng	ŋ
-p	p
-t	l
-k	k

== See also ==
- Chinese influence on Korean culture
- Korean language
- Hanja
- Korean mixed script
- Sino-Japanese vocabulary
- Sino-Vietnamese vocabulary
