= Non-Sinoxenic pronunciations =

Type of vocabulary borrowed from Chinese

Non-Sinoxenic pronunciations are vocabularies borrowed from Chinese, but differ from Sinoxenic pronunciations in that:

- The corresponding Chinese writing system is not borrowed alongside the pronunciation
- The pronunciation did not arise from the attempt at adopting Chinese as the literary language
- The borrowed vocabulary is not limited to Classical Chinese, but often includes modern and colloquial forms of Chinese

As such, non-Sinoxenic pronunciations are therefore loanwords in which the corresponding Chinese character is not adopted. These non-Sinoxenic pronunciations are thus most prominent in Asian languages in which cultural exchanges with Chinese culture occurred (e.g. Mongolian, Central Asian or Turkic languages), but the adoption of the Chinese writing system did not occur. This also includes non-Sinitic languages within China (e.g. Tibetan, Uyghur, Hani, Zhuang, Hmong). While the Sinoxenic model has traditionally held the limelight as the most distinctive and influential model for the borrowing of Chinese vocabulary, it is not the only model. For Sinoxenic languages, pronunciations are regarded as non-Sinoxenic if there is a mismatch between the vocabulary and the codified Sinoxenic pronunciation.

== Mongolian ==
=== Timespan ===
Chronologically, Mongolian borrowing of Chinese vocabulary took place later than that of the Sinoxenic languages. In contrast to Sinoxenic vocabulary, Sino-Mongolian vocabulary is not the result of an attempt to adopt Chinese as the literary language or the adoption of the Chinese writing system as a whole. The majority of Mongolian loanwords from Chinese occurred in the last 800 years, sourced from Early, Middle, and Modern Mandarin as spoken in northern China, rather than Classical Chinese, as in the case of Sinospheric cultures.

=== Indirect and direct borrowing ===
Modes of borrowing are not uniform. Some vocabulary was borrowed indirectly, such as the term for writing, bichig (Mongolian script: ᠪᠢᠴᠢᠭ᠌; Mongolian Cyrillic: бичиг), which appears to have entered from Turkic in ancient times. Bichig derives from biir (ᠪᠢᠷ; Mongolian Cyrillic: бийр), which was adopted from Tibetan for writing instrument, pir (Tibetan: པིར), which itself is derived from the Chinese word for pen or writing brush (Chinese: 笔; pinyin: bǐ).

In more recent times, most words have been borrowed directly. Some are starkly different from the Chinese pronunciation because of the long time for pronunciations to change or because of impressionistic auditory borrowing. One example is the word for window, tsonkh (Mongolian script: ᠴᠣᠩᠬᠣ; Mongolian Cyrillic: цонх), from Chinese chuānghu (Chinese: 窗戶). Similarly, the word for peace, taivang (Mongolian script: ᠲᠠᠢᠢᠪᠣᠩ; Mongolian Cyrillic: тайван) is supposedly from Chinese tàipíng (Chinese: 太平), which also means peace. Note that the traditional spelling (which equates to 'taibung') makes no attempt to reproduce the original vowel in 平 'píng'.

Although the traditional Mongolian script often tends to highlight the original Chinese pronunciation, the Cyrillic orthography, which spells words as they are pronounced, obscures the connection with Chinese. For instance, the syllable-final н in the Cyrillic script is pronounced /ŋ/ in Mongolia, thus neutralising the earlier distinction between /ŋ/ and /n/ in this position and further obscuring the regularity of relationships with Chinese. The distinction between /ŋ/ and /n/ is retained in Inner Mongolian dialects.

=== Examples ===
Note that the following examples are in the context of non-Sinoxenic vocabulary that exist in the Mongolian language.

The Sinoxenic languages of Japanese, Korean and Vietnamese are included for comparative purposes. Words that do not actually occur in the Sinoxenic languages are given in their Sinoxenic reading but are greyed out. The absence of these terms in Sinoxenic languages suggests that the borrowing of Chinese in Mongolian is attributed to a more recent form of a Sinitic language (such as Early Mandarin and Middle Mandarin), rather than Classical Chinese.

Artisan occupations
Meaning	Chinese characters	Chinese pronunciation	Mongolian	Mongolian Script	Japanese	Korean	Vietnamese
Brassfounder	銅匠	ㄊㄨㄥˊ ㄐㄧㄤˋ tóngjiàng	түнжаан (tünǰaan)	ᠳᠥᠨᠵᠢᠶᠠᠩ (tünǰiyaŋ)	どうしょう (dōshō)	동장 (dongjang)	đồng tượng
Carpenter	木匠	ㄇㄨˋ ㄐㄧㄤˋ mùjiàng	мужаан (muǰaan)	ᠮᠤᠵᠢᠶᠠᠩ (muǰiyaŋ)	ぼくしょう (bokushō) or もくしょう (mokushō)	목장 (mokjang)	mộc tượng
Ironworker	鐵匠	ㄊㄧㄝˇ ㄐㄧㄤˋ tiějiàng	тижаан (tiǰaan)	ᠲᠢᠵᠢᠶᠠᠩ (tiǰiyaŋ)	てっしょう (tesshō)	철장 (cheoljang)	thiết tượng
Silversmith	銀匠	ㄧㄣˊ ㄐㄧㄤˋ yínjiàng	инжаан (inǰaan)	ᠢᠨᠵᠢᠶᠠᠩ (inǰiyaŋ)	ぎんしょう (ginshō)	은장 (eunjang)	ngân tượng
Stonemason	石匠	ㄕˊ ㄐㄧㄤˋ shíjiàng	шожоон (šoǰoon)	ᠱᠤᠵᠢᠶᠠᠩ (šoǰiyaŋ)	せきしょう (sekishō)	석장 (seokjang)	thạch tượng

Food related
Meaning	Chinese characters	Chinese pronunciation	Mongolian	Mongolian Script	Japanese	Korean	Vietnamese
Gourd	葫蘆	ㄏㄨˊ ㄌㄨˊ húlu	хулуу (xuluu)	ᠬᠣᠯᠣ (xulu)	ころ (koro)	호로 (horo)	hồ lô
Green pepper	青椒	ㄑㄧㄥ ㄐㄧㄠ qīngjiāo	чинжүү (činjüü)	ᠴᠢᠨᠵᠦᠦ (činǰüü) or ᠴᠢᠩ ᠵᠢᠶᠣᠣ (čiŋ ǰiyuu)	せいしょう (seishō)	청초 (cheongcho)	thanh tiêu
Peanut	花生	ㄏㄨㄚ ㄕㄥ huāshēng	хуасан (xuasan)	ᠬᠣᠸᠠᠱᠧᠩ (xuwašEŋ)	かせい (kasei)	화생 (hwasaeng)	hoa sinh
Pepper (spice)	花椒	ㄏㄨㄚ ㄐㄧㄠ huājiāo	хуажуу (xuaǰuu)	ᠬᠣᠸᠠᠵᠣᠣ (xuwaǰuu)	かしょう (kashō)	화초 (hwacho)	hoa tiêu
Radish	蘿蔔	ㄌㄨㄛˊ ㄅㄨˇ luóbo	лууван (luuvan)	ᠯᠣᠣᠪᠠᠩ (luubaŋ)	らふく, (rafuku) or らほく (rahoku)	나복 (nabok) or 라복 (rabok)	la bặc
Steamed bread (or dumpling)	饅頭	ㄇㄢˊ ㄊㄡˊ mántou	мантуу (mantuu)	ᠮᠠᠨᠲᠠᠣ (mantau)	まんとう (mantō)	만두 (mandu)	màn thầu
Teapot	茶壺	ㄔㄚˊ ㄏㄨˊ cháhú	саахуу (saaxuu)	ᠰᠠᠬᠣᠣ (saxuu)	ちゃこ (chako)	차호 (chaho)	trà ho, chè ho

== Korean ==
=== Sinoxenic vs non-Sinoxenic ===
Sino-Korean vocabulary, borrowing from Middle Chinese with highly consistent and systematic pronunciation correspondences, dominates the spectrum of borrowed Chinese words. However, there are words in Korean also derived from Chinese that do not align with the systematically borrowed pronunciation. Such loanwords most likely preserve a different Sinitic variety or different stage of Sinitic from the one codified in Sino-Korean, thus making such words Sinitic borrowings but not classically Korean Sino-Xenic (non-Sinoxenic) pronunciation.

==== Examples ====
===== Brush =====
- The Korean term for brush, but (붓), descended from Middle Korean but (붇), is likely derived from Sinitic 'brush' 筆 (Old Chinese *p.[r]ut) This predates the Sino-Korean pronunciation for 筆 (from Middle Chinese pit), now pronounced as pil (필).

===== Ink =====
- The Korean term for ink, meok (먹), is likely derived from the Sinitic 'ink' 墨—possibly Early Middle Chinese (*mək) or Old Chinese (*C.mˤək). This predates the Sino-Korean reading for 墨, now pronounced as muk (묵).

===== Horse =====
- The Korean term for horse, mal (말), may have been derived from the Early Middle Chinese term for horse (馬), but actually, the Sino-Korean reading for 馬 was codified (and is pronounced) as ma (마). However, considering the Mongolic word for horse, mori, shows a trace of the l/r consonant in mal (Korean mal becomes mari in the nominative case), it is unlikely to be a Chinese loanword.

=== Old Chinese cognates ===
A few native Korean words closely resemble reconstructed pronunciations of Old Chinese that was spoken at least 2000 years ago in China. It is unclear if these words are borrowed from Old Chinese, or if Old Chinese borrowed these words from an ancient Koreanic language, or if these words are borrowed from another language (i.e. both Old Korean and Old Chinese borrowed from another language), or if these words are descended from a common proto-language, or if these words are false cognates by mere chance. These words may or may not be non-Sinoxenic pronunciations.

==== Examples ====
===== Wind =====
- The Korean term for wind, baram (바람), may have been derived from the Old Chinese term for wind, /*prəm/ (風). The Sino-Korean reading for 風 is pronounced as pung (풍), from Middle Chinese (Baxter pjuwng, ZZ /*pɨuŋ/).

===== Taste =====
- The Korean term for taste, mat / mas- (맛), may have been derived from the Old Chinese term for taste, /*mɯds/ (味). The Sino-Korean reading for 味 is pronounced as mi (미), from Middle Chinese (Baxter mj+jH, ZZ /*mʉiH/).

===== Bowl =====
- The Korean term for bowl, geureut / geureus- (그릇), may have been derived from the Old Chinese term for container, /*kʰrɯds/ (器). The Sino-Korean reading for 器 is pronounced as gi (기), from Middle Chinese (Baxter khijH, ZZ /*kʰˠiɪH/).

===== Comb =====
- The Korean term for comb, bit / bis- (빗), may have been derived from the Old Chinese term for comb, /*bis/ (篦). The Sino-Korean reading for 篦 is pronounced as bi (비), from Middle Chinese (Baxter pej, ZZ /*pei/).

===== River =====
- The Korean term for river, garam (가람), may have been derived from the Old Chinese term for river, /*kroːŋ/ (江). The Sino-Korean reading for 江 is pronounced as gang (강), from Middle Chinese (Baxter kaewng, ZZ /*kˠʌŋ/).

===== Bear =====
- The Korean term for bear, gom (곰), may have been derived from the Old Chinese term for bear, /*ɢʷlɯm/ (熊). The Sino-Korean reading for 熊 is pronounced as ung (웅), from Middle Chinese (Baxter hjuwng, ZZ /*ɦɨuŋ/).

===== Dragon =====
- The Korean term for dragon, mireu (미르), may have been derived from the Old Chinese term for dragon, /*mroːŋ/ (龍). The Sino-Korean reading for 龍 is pronounced as ryong (룡), from Middle Chinese (Baxter ljowng, ZZ /*lɨoŋ/).

===== Street =====
- The Korean term for street, geori (거리), may have been derived from the Old Chinese term for street, /*kreː/ (街). The Sino-Korean reading for 街 is pronounced as ga (가), from Middle Chinese (Baxter kea, ZZ /*kˠɛ/).

== Vietnamese ==
Some Sinologists such as Wang Li have attempted to classify words of Chinese origins into at least three categories: old or pre-Sino-Vietnamese vocabulary, Sino-Vietnamese vocabulary, and nativized Chinese vocabulary. Among the three, only Sino-Vietnamese vocabulary is considered to have a Sino-Xenic pronunciation, borrowed from Classical Chinese. The other two were introduced verbally through colloquial speech and are not as systematic, especially in terms of the lack of consistent correspondence between the tones of Vietnamese tones and the four tones of Middle Chinese. Some dictionaries, such as that of Thiều Chửu, may consider some pre-Sino-Vietnamese syllables to be Sino-Vietnamese.

Consequences of the multiple layers of borrowing are doublets and alternative readings:

Traditional Chinese	Middle Chinese	Pre-Sino-Vietnamese (non-Sino-Xenic)	Sino-Vietnamese (Sino-Xenic)	Nativized Chinese (non-Sino-Xenic)	Gloss
嫁	kæH	gả	giá		to marry off
價	kæH	cả	giá		price
斧	pjuX	búa	phủ		hammer
符	bju	bùa	phù		spell; charm
佛	bjut	Bụt	Phật		Buddha
夏	hæH	hè	hạ		summer
車	tsyhæ	xe	xa		wheeled vehicle
未	mjɨjH	Mùi	vị		zodiac goat
味	mjɨjH	mùi	vị		smell; taste
為	hjwe		vị	vì	because
類	lwijH		loại	loài	kind; species
外	ngwajH		ngoại	ngoài	outside
鏡	kjængH		kính	gương	mirror
劍	kjæmH		kiếm	gươm	sword
記	kiH		kí	ghi	to write
壁	pek		bích	vách	wall
板	pænX		bản	ván	plank; board

Apart from these old borrowings, which are deeply integrated into Vietnamese, there are also phonetic borrowings of Yue or Cantonese origin, such as lì xì, lạp xưởng, xíu mại, xí ngầu, hầm bà lằng, and tả pín lù. These words were also borrowed through the spoken language and, unlike Sino-Vietnamese, also are not systematic. They are especially common in southern Vietnam, which has a significant population of Chinese, known as the Hoa ethnic group. A lot of these pronunciations came from recent Cantonese migration to southern Vietnam during the 17th–20th centuries. Most of the Cantonese eventually settled down in Chợ Lớn, and they introduced their cuisine to Vietnam. Thus, many Cantonese borrowings in Vietnamese are food-related.

Chinese characters	Cantonese	Teochew	Vietnamese borrowing	Sino-Vietnamese pronunciation
豉油 'soy sauce'	si^{6} jau^{4}		xì dầu	thị du
點心 'dim sum, Cantonese food'	dim^{2} sam^{1}		điểm sấm	điểm tâm
雲吞, 餛飩 'wonton'	wan^{4} tan^{1}, wan^{4} tan^{4-1}		vằn thắn, hoành thánh	vân thôn, hồn đồn
饅頭 'mantou'	maan^{6} tau^{4}		màn thầu	man đầu
燒賣 'shumai'	siu^{1} maai^{6-2}		xíu mại	thiêu mại
臘腸 'Chinese sausage; lap cheong'	laap^{6} coeng^{4-2}		lạp xưởng	lạp tràng/trường
蝦餃 'har gow'	haa^{1} gaau^{2}		há cảo	hà giảo
水圓 'tangyuan'	seoi^{2} jyun^{4}		sủi dìn	thuỷ viên
叉燒 'char siu'	caa^{1} siu^{1}		xá xíu	xoa thiêu
酸梅 'smoked plum'	syun^{1} mui^{4}		xí muội	toan mai
白小 'white coffee'	baak^{6} siu^{2}		bạc xỉu	bạch tiểu
咖椰 'coconut jam'	gaa^{3} je^{4}		ca dé	ca da
豆腐 'douhua'	dau^{6} fu^{6}		tàu hủ	đậu hủ
清補涼 'ching bo leung'	cing^{1} bou^{2} loeng^{4-2}		sâm bổ lượng	thanh bổ lương
芥蘭 'gai lan'	gaai^{3} laan^{4-2}		cải làn	giới lan
味精 'Monosodium glutamate'	mei^{6} zing^{1}		mì chính	vị tinh
腩 'flank beef'	naam5		nạm (Note: This borrowing is from the meaning rather than the pronunciation.)	nạm
香港 'Hong Kong'	hoeng^{1} gong^{2}		Hồng Kông	Hương Cảng (dated name)
我愛你 'I love you'	ngo^{5} oi^{3} nei^{5}		ngộ ái nị (humorous, is rarely used)	ngã ái nhĩ
幸 'lucky'	hang^{6}		hên	hạnh
利市 'red envelope'	lai^{6} si^{6}		lì xì	lợi thị
馬刀 'machete'	maa^{5} dou^{1}		mã tấu	mã đao
抵制 'to boycott'	dai^{2} zai^{3}		tẩy chay	để chế
曬冷 'to let go of all restraints'	saai^{3} laang^{5-1}		xả láng	sái lãnh
冚唪唥 'mixed; mingled; miscellaneous'	ham^{6} baang^{6} laang^{6}		hầm bà lằng	(no reading) phủng (no reading) (Note: Two of the characters, specifically 冚 and 唥, are characters used mainly in Cantonese, thus there are no Sino-Vietnamese readings for these characters.)
死 'to die; ugly; bad'	sei^{2}, si^{2}		xí (slang)	tử
衰鬼 'unlucky'	seoi^{1} gwai^{2}		xúi quẩy	suy quỷ
食 'to eat'	sik^{6}		xực (slang)	thực
長衫 'cheongsam'	coeng4 saam1		xường xám	trường sam
小 'tiny'	siu^{2}		xíu	tiểu
一 'the best'	jat^{1}		(số) dách	nhất
十四十五 'to cheat'	sap^{6} sei^{3} sap^{6} ng^{5}		xập xí xập ngầu	thập tứ thập ngũ
四五 'die [as in dice])	sei^{3} ng^{5}		xí ngầu	tứ ngũ
麻雀 'mahjong'	maa^{4} zoek^{3}		mạt chược	ma tước
打邊爐 'Chinese hotpot'	daa^{2} bin^{1} lou^{4}		tả pín lù	đả biên lô
爐 'hotpot'		lou^{5}	lẩu	lô
薄餅 'popiah'		boh^{8} bian^{2}	bò bía	bạc bánh
粿條 'kuyteav'		guê^{2} diou^{5}	hủ tiếu	quả điều
仙草 'grass jelly'		siêng^{1} cao^{2}	sương sáo	tiên thảo

== Zhuang ==
According to Zev Handel, Sino-Zhuang is the term used to describe pronunciations in the Zhuang language that are used to read Chinese characters. These borrowings are borrowed from Old Chinese to present-day Chinese. However, there were no large scale borrowings or formal standardised readings of Chinese characters such as seen during the development of the Sino-xenic languages such as Vietnamese. These readings were unsystematically borrowed.

Chinese characters	Middle Chinese	Zhuang	Gloss
我	ngaX	ngoh	I; me
壓	'aep	ep	to force
大	dajH	daih	big; large
國	kwok	guek	country

== Other examples ==
=== Radish ===
The word "radish" in Chinese (simplified Chinese: 萝卜; traditional Chinese: 蘿蔔; pinyin: luóbo) was attested in various forms since early Old Chinese. This is the source of the terms for "radish" and "turnip" in Sinoxenic languages like Korean (나복, nabok in Standard South Korean; or 라복, rabok in Standard North Korean) and it has also been adopted in a non-Sinoxenic way by many other languages in China and elsewhere in Asia. In Mongolian as spoken in Mongolia, its meaning has shifted to refer to a carrot, while radish is referred to as tsagaan luuvan (Mongolian: Цагаан лууван, lit. 'white carrot'). Note the presence of a final velar stop (orthographically -k or -g). This is still reflected in a number of Southern Chinese varieties (Cantonese lo4 baak6, Hokkien lô-po̍k), but lost in Standard Chinese.

Radish
Chinese	Hmong	Indonesian	Malaysian	Mongolian	Tibetan	Uyghur	Zhuang
萝卜 (蘿蔔) ( ㄌㄨㄛˊ ㄅㄛ ) luóbo	lauj pwm or lwj pwm	lobak	lobak (لوبق)	лууван (luuvan) refers to "carrot"	ལ་ཕུག (la phug)	لوبو (lobo) or لوبۇ (lobu)	lauxbaeg

== See also ==
- Chinese language

- Classical Chinese
- Standard Chinese

- List of English words of Chinese origin
- Sino-Xenic pronunciations
