= List of English words of Chinese origin =

Words of Chinese origin have entered European languages, including English. Most of these were direct loanwords from various varieties of Chinese. However, Chinese words have also entered indirectly via other languages, particularly Korean, Japanese and Vietnamese, that have all used Chinese characters at some point and contain a large number of Chinese loanwords.

== Sources ==
English words of Chinese origin usually have different characteristics, depending on precisely how the words encountered the West. Despite the increasingly widespread use of Standard Chinese—based on the Beijing dialect of Mandarin—among Chinese people, English words based on Mandarin are comparatively few.

Chinese vocabulary has spread to the West by means such as:

- via missionaries who were living in China. These have heavy Latin influence due to Portuguese and Spanish missionaries.
- via sinologists who lived in China. These have heavy French influence due to the long history of French sinology.
- via the maritime trade route, e.g. tea, Amoy, cumshaw etc. Heavily influenced by the Min Nan Amoy dialect in southern seaports.
- via the early immigrants to the American West during gold rush era, e.g. chop suey. Heavily influenced by the Toisan dialect.
- via the multi-national colonization of Shanghai. Influenced by many European countries, as well as Japan.
- via the British colonization of Hong Kong, e.g. cheongsam. Heavily influenced by Cantonese.
- via modern international communication, especially after the 1970s when the People's Republic of China reduced up travel restrictions, allowing emigration to various countries, e.g. wushu, feng shui. Heavily influenced by Mandarin.
- via Japanese, Korean, and Vietnamese, often Sino-Xenic words, These languages historically borrowed large swaths of Chinese vocabulary, and wrote Chinese and their native language in Chinese characters. The pronunciation of such loanwords is not based directly on Chinese, but on the local pronunciation of Chinese loanwords in these languages, known as Sino-Japanese, Sino-Korean, and Sino-Vietnamese. In addition, the individual characters were extensively used as building blocks for local neologisms with no semantic counterpart in the original Chinese, resulting in words whose relationship to the Chinese language is similar to the relationship between new Latinate words—particularly those that form a large part of the international scientific vocabulary—and Latin. Such words are excluded from the list, as they sound pretty similar to their English renderings.

Though all these following terms originated from China, the spelling of the English words depends on the direct point of contact and borrowing, as well as which transliteration scheme is typically used.

== Table ==
English	Direct origin	Word	Transliteration	Details
Baizuo	Mandarin	白左	báizuǒ	The word is made up of two Chinese morphemes, bai (Chinese: 白; pinyin: bái, "white") and zuo (Chinese: 左; pinyin: zuǒ, "left"),lit. 'white left'. In China, this term is used to describe Western liberals, progressives, or "awakened" individuals, particularly those who focus on identity politics, immigration, and environmentalism while ignoring practical issues.
Bok choy, pak choi, pok choi	Cantonese	白菜	baak^{6} coi^{3}	A Chinese cabbage: lit. 'white vegetable'
Brainwash	Semantic borrowing	洗腦	xínǎo	A calque of Chinese 洗腦, literally 洗; 'wash' 腦; 'brain'. The term was first used by the People's Volunteer Army during the Korean War, then picked up by the American media. It refers to forcible indoctrination to induce someone to give up basic political, social or religious beliefs and attitudes and to accept contrasting regimented ideas; or persuasion by propaganda or salesmanship. The term "brainwashing" came into mainstream English after the Western media first used the term to describe the attitudes of POWs returning from the Korean War.
Cha	Cantonese	茶	caa^{4}	tea, see 'tea' below
Char siu	Cantonese	叉燒	caa^{1} siu^{1}	lit. fork roasted
Cheongsam	Cantonese	長衫	coeng^{4} saam^{1}	lit. 'long clothes', popularly used during the 19th and early 20th centuries.
Chin chin, chin-chin	Mandarin	請	qǐng	lit. 'please', 'invite', an exclamation used to express good wishes before drinking—cf. Mandarin 乾杯; gānbēi; 'empty the glass', Sino-Japanese kanpai. While chin-chin is an informal and somewhat dated term in British English, (for instance the TV sitcom As Time Goes By),, it is only occasionally used in American English.
China	Old Chinese	秦 or 晉	/*[dz]i[n]/, /*tsi[n]-s/ (Baxter-Sagart)	Via Latin Sina, Persian چین Cin, and Sanskrit चीन Chinas; ultimately either from the name of the 秦; 'Qin' or 晉; 'Jin' state
Chop chop	Cantonese	速速	cuk^{1} cuk^{1}	lit. 'hurry', 'urgent'
Chopsticks	Pidgin	筷子	Kuai zi	from Chinese Pidgin English chop chop.
Chop suey	Cantonese	雜碎	zaap^{6} seoi^{3}	'mixed pieces'
Chow	Cantonese	炒	caau^{2}	From meaning 'cook', perhaps based on Cantonese. lit. 'to stir fry'
Chow Chow	Cantonese			any of a breed of heavy-coated blocky dogs of Chinese origin
Chow mein	Cantonese (Taishanese)	炒麵	caau^{2} min^{6}	lit. 'stir fried noodle', from when the first Chinese immigrants from Taishan came to the United States.
Confucius	Jesuit Latinization	孔夫子	Kǒngfūzǐ	Latinization of 'Master Kong'
Cumshaw	Hokkien (Amoy)	感謝	kám-siā	feeling gratitude
Dim sum, Dim sim	Cantonese	點心	dim^{2} sam^{1}	lit. '(slightly) touches the heart, skimming the heart, igniting the heart', generally an idiom meaning 'dessert, pastry (accompanied by green tea), light refreshments'
Fan-tan	Cantonese	番攤	faan^{1} taan^{1}	'take turns scattering'
Feng shui	Mandarin	風水	fēngshuǐ	from 風; 'wind' and 水; 'water'; denotes a form of aesthetic balance, generally in rooms or objects
Foo dog	Mandarin	佛	fó	Refers to the statues of lions that serve as guardians of Buddhist temples: combination of 佛; 'Buddha' and 'dog', due to the statues resembling dogs
Ginkgo	Sino-Japanese	銀杏	ginkyō	From Japanese ginkyō or ginnan
Ginseng	Hokkien	人參	jîn-sim	From the name of the plant: some say the word came via the Japanese pronunciation, though 人参 now means 'carrot' in Japanese, while the modern word for 'ginseng' is 朝鮮人參, 'Korean carrot'.
Go	Sino-Japanese	碁	go	Japanese name for the Chinese board game, cf. Mandarin 圍棋; wéiqí.
Guanxi	Mandarin	關係	guānxi	lit. 'relationship', refers to such in Chinese culture—or refers to nepotism or cronyism in Chinese business and bureaucracy
Gung-ho	Mandarin	工合	gōnghé	Short for 工業合作社; 'Chinese Industrial Cooperatives'
Gweilo	Cantonese	鬼佬	gwai^{2} lou^{2}	Literally 'ghost guy', used as an insult for Westerners. Without modifiers, it refers to white people and has a history of deprecatory use, though it has been argued that it now has a more neutral connotation.
Gyoza	Sino-Japanese	餃子	gyōza	From Chinese jiǎozi; 'stuffed dumpling'. In English, refers to the fried style of dumplings, as opposed to those boiled in water.
Hanfu	Mandarin	漢服	hànfú	lit. 'Han clothing': traditional Chinese clothes, includes several varieties for both men and women.
Har gow	Cantonese	蝦餃	haa^{1} gaau^{2}	'shrimp dumpling'
Hoisin	Cantonese	海鮮	hoi^{2} sin^{1}	'seafood'
Japan	Hokkien	日本	Ji̍-pún	lit. 'sun's origin'
Junzi	Mandarin	君子	jūnzǐ	lit. 'person of high stature'; translatable as "respectable person" or simply "gentleman"
Kanji	Sino-Japanese	漢字	kanji	Name for Chinese characters as used in Japanese, cf. Mandarin hànzì.
Kaolin	Mandarin	高嶺	gāolǐng	lit. 'high mountain peak', the name of a village or suburb of Jingdezhen in Jiangxi, the site of a mine from which kaolin clay (高嶺土; gāolǐngtǔ) was taken to make the fine porcelain produced in Jingde.
Keemun	Cantonese	祁門	kei^{4} mun^{4}	tea from Qimen
Ketchup	Hokkien (Amoy)	膎汁	kê-chiap	In the 17th century, the Chinese mixed a concoction of pickled fish and spices, called kôe-chiap or kê-chiap in Amoynese, whose meaning refers to the brine of pickled fish or shellfish (膎; 'pulp', 汁; 'juice'). By the early 18th century, the sauce had made it to the Malay peninsula, where it was later discovered by English explorers. That word then gradually evolved into the English word "ketchup", and was taken to the American colonies by English settlers.
Koan	Sino-Japanese	公案	kōan	cf. Mandarin 公案; gōng'àn; 'public record'
Kowtow	Cantonese	叩頭	kau^{3} tau^{4}	'knock head'
Kumquat, cumquat	Cantonese	柑橘	gam^{1} gwat^{1}	'tangerine'
Kung fu	Cantonese	功夫	gung^{1} fu^{1}	lit. 'efforts', used in English to collectively describe Chinese martial arts
Lo mein	Cantonese	撈麵	lou^{1} min^{6}	'scooped noodle'
Longan	Cantonese	龍眼	lung^{4} ngaan^{5}	lit. 'dragon's eye'
Long time no see	Calque from Mandarin	好久不見	hǎojiǔbùjiàn	—N/a
Loquat	Cantonese	蘆橘	lou^{4} gwat^{1}	Archaic name for the fruit
Lychee	Cantonese	荔枝	lai^{6} zi^{1}	twigs of cat-tail like grass
Mao-tai, moutai	Mandarin	茅台酒	máotáijiǔ	liquor from Maotai, Guizhou
Mahjong	Ultimately Northern Wu	麻將	mo-tsian	sparrow checkmate, short for 'hemp sparrow warfare', hemp sparrow being the term for house sparrow, and sparrow warfare (麻雀战; 麻雀戰), a form of guerrilla tactics. Name derived from 麻雀 with the erhua suffix 兒, which is a nasal element in Northern Wu (mo-tsiaq-ng > mo-tsian)
Mu shu	Mandarin	木須	mùxū	'wood shredded pork'
Nankeen	Mandarin	南京	Nánjīng	The name for a city, sometimes used in English to refer to the durable, buff-colored cotton cloth originally produced there.
No can do	Semantic borrowing	唔可以 (Cantonese), 不可以 (Mandarin)	m^{4} ho^{2} yi^{5}; bù kěyǐ	Calque, though also possibly a calque of Mandarin 不能做; bùnéng zùo; 'no can do'.
Nunchuk	Hokkien	雙節棍, 兩節棍	nng-chat-kun	Via Okinawan Japanese, lit. 'pair of joined sticks, double jointed sticks'
Oolong	Hokkien (Amoy)	烏龍	o͘-liông	'dark dragon'
Pai gow	Cantonese	排九	paai^{4} gau^{2}	lit. 'row of nine', 'line of nine'
Paper tiger	Semantic borrowing	紙老虎	zhǐlǎohǔ	Calque of an idiom referring to a thing or person whose claims to be threatening or powerful are paper-thin, as they are actually ineffectual and unable to withstand challenge. Became known internationally due to its use by Mao Zedong to refer to his political opponents, particularly the American government.
Pekin	Mandarin	北京	Běijīng	From an older romanization of Beijing. A distinction used to be made between "sharp" (ie. dentialveolar) and "blunt" (ie. alveolo-palatal) sibilants before high front vowels; the latter was conventionally spelt with velar consonants (k, g).
Pidgin	Chinese Pidgin English	pidgin		From the CPE term for business, ie. "business language" (English)
Pinyin	Mandarin	拼音	pīnyīn	'put together sounds', 'spelled-out sounds'
Pekoe	Hokkien (Amoy)	白毫	pe̍k-hô	'white downy hair'
Pongee	Cantonese	本機		lit. 'our own loom', 'homespun', a kind of thin silk
Pu'er, puerh	Mandarin	普洱	Pǔ'ěr	Named after a city
Qi, ch'i	Mandarin	氣	qì	Energy of an object or person, lit. 'air', 'spirit'. (Note: This word has the Wade–Giles romanization of ch'i, but the rough breathing mark—replaced by an apostrophe in most texts—has largely disappeared in colloquial English.)
Qipao	Mandarin	旗袍	qípáo	Another name for Cheongsam.
Ramen	Sino-Japanese	拉麵	rāmen	cf. Mandarin lāmiàn
Rickshaw	Sino-Japanese	人力車	zinrikusya	Japanese neologism, jinrikisha (c. 1887) composed of semantic elements 人; 'human', 力; 'power' and 車; 'vehicle'.
Sampan	Cantonese	舢舨	saan^{1} baan^{2}	—N/a
Scared to lose	Semantic borrowing from Hokkien	驚輸 / 惊输	kiaⁿ-su	"Scared to lose" appears in several song names and lyrics in English. It comes from the Hokkien kiaⁿ-su which literally means "scared to lose".
Shanghai	Mandarin	上海	Shànghǎi	The city name, used in English as a verb meaning 'to put someone aboard a ship by trickery or intoxication', or generally 'to put someone in a bad situation by trickery'. From an old practice of deceitfully acquiring sailors for voyages to Shanghai
Shantung	Mandarin	山東	Shāndōng	The Wade-Giles romanization of the province's name, used in English to refer to a wild silk fabric, usually undyed.
Shaolin	Mandarin	少林	shàolín	—N/a
Shar Pei	Cantonese	沙皮	sa^{1} pei^{4}	'sand skin'
Shih Tzu	Mandarin	獅子狗	shīzigǒu	lit. 'lion child dog', Chinese lion. Spelt using the Wade-Giles romanization.
Shogun	Sino-Japanese	將軍	shōgun	lit. 'military general', the full Japanese title was 征夷大将軍, Seii Taishōgun, 'generalissimo who overcomes the barbarians'
Siu mai	Cantonese	燒賣	siu^{1} maai^{2}	pork dumplings, lit. 'to cook and sell'
Sifu	Cantonese	師傅	si^{1} fu^{2}	'master'
Souchong	Cantonese	小種茶	siu^{2} zung^{2} caa^{4}	'small kind of tea'
Soy	Satsuma Sino-Japanese	醬油	soi	From Satsuma Japanese, the variety spoken in and around Kagoshima. Cf. Mandarin jiàngyóu, Tokyo Japanese syouyu
Struggle session	Semantic calque from Mandarin	批鬥大會	pīdòudàhuì	According to Lin Yutang, the expression comes from 批判; pīpàn; 'to criticize and judge' and 鬥爭; dòuzhēng; 'to fight and contest', so the whole expression conveys the message of 'inciting spirited judgment and fighting'. It was often shortened to 批鬥; pīdòu. The term refers to a phenomenon especially prevalent during the Cultural Revolution, where public sessions were ostensibly held for the benefit the target, intending to eliminate counterrevolutionary, reactionary thinking.
Tai chi	Mandarin	太極	tàijí	From the Wade-Giles romanization of taijiquan (i.e., "tʻai chi chʻüan"), meaning 'great ultimate boxing'
Tai-pan	Cantonese	大班	daai^{6} baan^{1}	equivalent to "big shot"
Tangram	Compound word	唐	táng	from Tang + English gram
Tao, Dao	Mandarin	道	dào	'way', path'
Tea	Hokkien	茶	tê	In most European languages, the word resembles te; this reflects the version from Amoy. The other common word for tea worldwide, generally in places where tea came via the Silk Road, derives from the Mandarin pronunciation with the same Old Chinese etymology.
Tofu	Sino-Japanese	豆腐	tōfu	cf. Mandarin dòufu
Tong	Cantonese	堂	tong^{4}	—N/a
Tung oil	Cantonese	桐油	tung^{4} jau^{4}	—N/a
Tycoon	Sino-Japanese	大君	taikun	'great nobleman'
Typhoon	Hokkien (Taiwanese), Cantonese, or Mandarin	颱風	thai-hong	lit. 'wind coming from Taiwan', usually hong-thai in contemperary Taiwanese, cf. Cantonese toi^{4} fung^{1}, Shanghainese de-fon. Other etymologies exist.
Wok	Cantonese	鑊	wok^{6}	—N/a
Wonton	Cantonese	雲吞	wan^{4} tan^{1}	homophone in Cantonese with the original 餛飩, cf. Mandarin húntún, lit. 'cloud swallow', describing its shape
Wushu	Mandarin	武術	wǔshù	—N/a
Wuxia	Mandarin	武俠	wǔxiá	—N/a
Yamen	Mandarin	衙門	yámén	'court'
Yen	Cantonese	癮	yan^{5}	Craving, usually in reference to opium addiction, lit. 'addiction'
Yen	Sino-Japanese	圓	en	cf. Mandarin yuán, lit. 'round', 'name of currency unit'. Usually spelt 元 in Chinese languages and 圓 in dialects of Korean and Japanese.
Yin yang	Mandarin	陰陽	yīnyáng	Yin meaning 'feminine', 'dark' and yang meaning 'masculine', 'bright'
Yuanfen	Mandarin, Vietnamese	緣分	yuánfèn	lit. 'fateful coincidence'—conceptually similar to karma, but interactive instead of individualized; predestination without divine implications
Zen	Sino-Japanese	禪	zen	cf. Mandarin chán, originally from Sanskrit ध्यान Dhyāna, Pali झन jhāna.

== See also ==
- List of loanwords in Chinese
- List of Spanish words of Chinese origin
- Chinese Pidgin English
  - Chinglish
  - Singlish
