= List of loanwords in Chinese =

Loanwords have entered written and spoken Chinese from many sources, including ancient peoples whose descendants now speak Chinese. In addition to phonetic differences, varieties of Chinese such as Cantonese and Shanghainese often have distinct words and phrases left from their original languages which they continue to use in daily life and sometimes even in Mandarin. As a result of long-term direct relationships with northern peoples, starting from the Qin-Han period, there have been many exchanges of words. In addition, there were times when northern tribes dominated China. As a result, there are also a number of loanwords from nearby languages such as various Turkic languages, Mongolian, and Manchu (Tungusic).

Throughout China, Buddhism has also introduced words from Sanskrit and Pali. More recently, foreign invasion and trade since the First and Second Opium Wars of the mid-nineteenth century has led to prolonged contact with English, French, and Japanese. Although politically minded language reform under the Republic and People's Republic of China have generally preferred to use calques and neologisms in place of loanwords, a growing number – particularly from American English – have become current in modern Chinese. On the mainland, transcription into Chinese characters in official media and publications is directed by the Proper Names and Translation Service of the Xinhua News Agency and its reference work Names of the World's Peoples.

Since Hong Kong was under British control until 1997, Hong Kong Cantonese borrowed many words from English such as 巴士 (from the word "bus", pinyin: bāshì; Jyutping: baa^{1} si^{6-2}), 的士 (from "taxi", dīshì; dik^{1} si^{6-2}), 芝士 (from "cheese", zhīshì; zi^{1} si^{6-2}), and 麥當勞/麦当劳 (from "McDonald's", Màidāngláo; mak^{6} dong^{1} lou^{4}), and such loanwords have been adopted into Mandarin, despite them sounding much less similar to the English words than the Cantonese versions.

Foreign businesses and products are usually free to choose their own transliterations and typically select ones with positive connotations and phonetic similarity to their products: for example, 宜家 (IKEA) is "proper home". Owing to antonomasia and genericization, these can then enter general Chinese usage: for example Coca-Cola's 可口可乐; 可口可樂; kěkǒu kělè; "delicious fun" has led to 可乐; 可樂 kělè becoming the common Chinese noun for all colas.

Since the Kuomintang retreated to Taiwan after the Chinese Civil War, relations between the ROC and PRC had been hostile, thus communication between Taiwan and mainland China became limited. For that reason, many loanwords and proper names became quite different from each other. For example, "cheese" in mainland China is 芝士; zhīshì, while cheese in Taiwan is 起司; qǐsī.

== Sanskrit ==
The majority of Sanskrit loanwords entered Chinese in and before the Tang dyansty. As such, Baxter's transcription for Middle Chinese is provided for all terms. Many of the following, such as 尸陀林 and 舍利子, are hybrids between a loaned element and a native element (with both above examples having the first two syllables loaned and last one native), and some terms may have irregular pronunciations to better match the original Sanskrit pronunciation. This is most famous in the conclusion mantra of the Heart Sutra:

गते गते पारगते पारसंगते
बोधि स्वाहा

gate gate pāragate pārasaṃgate
bodhi svāhā

Gone, gone, gone to the other shore, landed at the other shore, "O Wisdom Svaha!"

Which is rendered in Chinese as:

Xuanzhang translation

揭諦揭諦 波羅揭諦
波羅僧揭諦 菩提薩婆訶

Baxter QYS

gjet tej^{H} gjet tej^{H} pa la gjet tej^{H}
pa la song gjet tej^{H} bu dej sat ba xa

Mandarin (Pinyin)

Jiēdì jiēdì bōluójiēdì
Bōluósēngjiēdì pútí sàpóhē

Cantonese (Jyutping)

gat^{3} de^{1} gat^{3} de^{1} bo^{1} lo^{4} gat^{3} de^{1}
bo^{1} lo^{4} zang^{1} gat^{3} de^{1} pou^{4} tai^{4} saat^{3} po^{4} ho^{1}

Shanghainese (Wugniu)

ciq-ti ciq-ti pu-lu ciq-ti
pu-lu-sen ciq-ti bu-di-saq bu-ho

Sino-Japanese (Nihonsiki)

gyatei gyatei hara gyatei
harasougyatei bozisowaka

Chinese Word	Pinyin	Baxter	Meaning	Original word	Original pronunciation	Original meaning
阿彌陀佛	Āmítuófó, Ēmítuófó	'a mjie da bjut	Amitābha	अमिताभ	amitābha	limitless light
波羅蜜多	bōluómìduō	pa la mjit ta	Pāramitā	पारमिता	pāramitā	perfection
剎那	chànà	tsrhaet na	instant	क्षण	kṣaṇa	instant
訶子	hēzǐ	xa tsi^{X}	chebulic myrobalan	हरीतकी	harītakī	
涅槃	nièpán	net ban	nirvana	निर्वाण	nirvāna	nirvana
蘋果	píngguǒ		apple	बिम्बा	bimbā	apple
菩提	pútí	bu dej	bodhi	बोधि	bodhi	supreme knowledge
舍利子	shèlìzǐ	syae^{H} lij^{H} tsi^{X}	śarīra relic; Śārika	शरीर	śarīra	body
尸陀林	shītuólín	syij da lim	shmashana	शीत	śīta	cold
曇花	tánhuā	dom xwae	epiphyllum	उदुम्बर	udumbara	cluster fig tree
須彌山	Xūmíshān	sju mjie srean	Mt. Sumeru	सुमेरु	sumeru	Mt. Sumeru
閻魔羅闍	yánmóluóshé	yem ma la dzyae	Yamaraja	यमराज	yamarāja	Yamaraja

== Persian ==
Chinese Word	Pronunciation	Meaning	Original word	Original pronunciation	Original meaning
巴刹	bāshā	bazaar (market)	بازار	bāzār	bazaar (market)
巴旦木	bādànmù	almond	بادام	bādām	almond
葡萄	pútáo	grape	باده or Bactrian *bādāwa	bāde	wine
獅子	shīzi	lion	شیر	šīr	lion
百里香	Bǎilǐxiāng	thyme	آویشن	Avišan	thyme
巫	wū	shaman, mage	مَجوس	maguš	magus, priest

== English ==
Chinese words of English origin have become more common in mainland China during its reform and opening and resultant increased contact with the West. Note that some of the words below originated in other languages but may have arrived in Chinese via English (for example "pizza/披萨" from Italian). English acronyms are sometimes borrowed into Chinese without any transcription into Chinese characters; for example "IT" (information technology), "PPT" (PowerPoint), "GDP" (Gross domestic product), "APP" (mobile app), "KTV" (karaoke), or "DVD". A rarer occurrence is the blending of the Latin alphabet with Chinese characters, as in "卡拉OK" ("karaoke"), “T恤” ("T-shirt"), "IP卡" ("internet protocol card"). In some instances, the loanwords exists side by side with neologisms that translate the meaning of the concept into existing Chinese morphemes. For instance, while the loanword for 'penicillin' is 盘尼西林 (pánníxīlín), a neologism that 'translates' the word was later coined, 青霉素 (qīngméisù), which means 'blue/green mold extract/essence'. In contemporary Chinese, neologisms using native Chinese morphemes tend to be favored over loanwords that are transliterations. In the case of penicillin, the term 青霉素 is used almost exclusively, while 盘尼西林 is viewed as an early 20th century relic. Similarly, 'science' is now known as 科学 (kēxué) 'subject/specialty study' rather than 赛因斯 (sàiyīnsī), though it should be pointed out that the characters 科学 were actually coined in the late 19th century by the Japanese as a kanji compound.

English	Pinyin	Simplified	Traditional	Notes
Amen	āmen	阿们	阿們	
ammonia	āmóníyà	阿摩尼亚	阿摩尼亞	Rarely used in mainland China
amoeba	āmǐbā	阿米巴		
amoxicillin	āmòxīlín	阿莫西林		
ampere	ānpéi	安培		
amphetamine	ānfēitāmìng	安非他命		
ampoule	ānbù	安瓿		
antitrust	fǎntuōlāsī	反托拉斯		
aspartame	āsībātián	阿斯巴甜		
Aspirin	āsīpílín	阿斯匹林		
Baccarat	Bǎijiālè	百家乐	百家樂	
bacon	péigēn	培根		From Shanghainese (cf. be-ken)
bagel	bèiguǒ	贝果	貝果	
ballet	bālěi	芭蕾		
bandage	bēngdài	绷带	繃帶	
banjo	bānzhuóqín	班卓琴		
bar	bā	吧		
Baroque	bāluòkè	巴洛克	巴洛克	
Baroque	bāluókè	巴罗克	巴羅克	
bass	bèisī	贝司	貝司	
bass	bèisī	贝斯	貝斯	
bassoon	bāsōngguǎn	巴松管		Used primarily in mainland China, Hong Kong, and Macau. In Taiwan, 長管 is preferred
bazooka	bāzǔkǎ	巴祖卡		
beer	píjiǔ	啤酒		From Cantonese (cf. be^{1} zau^{2})
bikini	bǐjīní	比基尼		
bingo	bīnguǒ	宾果	賓果	
bit (unit of information)	bǐtè	比特		
blog	bókè	博客		
blues	bùlǔsī	布鲁斯	布魯斯	
bolero	bōláiluó	波莱罗	波萊羅	
bourgeois	bù'ěrqiáoyà	布尔乔亚	布爾喬亞	
brandy	báilándì	白兰地	白蘭地	
brownie	bùlǎngní	布朗尼		
bullying	bàlíng	霸凌		
bungee jumping	bèngjí	蹦极	蹦極	
bus	bāshì	巴士		Chiefly Hong Kong
bye-bye	bàibài	拜拜		
caffeine	kāfēiyīn	咖啡因		
calorie	kǎlùlǐ	卡路里		
cancan	kāngkāngwǔ	康康舞		
cannon	jiānóngpào	加农炮	加農炮	
carat	kèlā	克拉		
carbine	kǎbīnqiāng	卡宾枪	卡賓槍	
card	kǎpiàn	卡片		As the last element of a compound, kǎ 卡 alone is used, e.g. yínháng kǎ 银行卡 / 銀行卡 "Bank card (ATM card)".
carnival	jiāniánhuá	嘉年华	嘉年華	
cartel	kǎtè'ěr	卡特尔	卡特爾	
cartoon	kǎtōng	卡通		
cashmere	kāishìmǐ	开士米	開士米	
celluloid	sàilùluò	赛璐珞	賽璐珞	
cement	shúiméntīng	水门汀	水門汀	Dated in Standard Mandarin. From Shanghainese (cf. sy-men-thin)
cha-cha	qiàqiàwǔ	恰恰舞		
Champagne	xiāngbīn	香槟	香檳	
cheese	qǐsī	起司		Used primarily in Taiwan. From Shanghainese (cf. chi-sy)
cheese	qishì	奇士		Used primarily in Taiwan.
cheese	zhīshì	芝士		Used primarily in Hong Kong. From Cantonese (cf. zi^{1} si^{6-2})
cherry	chēlízi	车厘子	車厘子	Transliterated from plural, exclusively refers to black cherries in mainland China. From Cantonese (cf. ce^{1} lei^{4} zi^{2})
chiffon	xuěfǎng	雪纺	雪紡	As in a kind of fabric
chiffon	qìfēng	戚风	戚風	As in chiffon cake
chocolate	qiǎokèlì	巧克力		From Shanghainese (cf. chiau-kheq-liq)
cider	xīdá	西打		
cigar	xuějiā	雪茄		From Shanghainese (cf. shiq-ga)
clone	kèlóng	克隆		
coca, coke	kějiā	可加		
coca, coke	gǔkē	古柯		
Coca-Cola	kěkǒu kělè	可口可乐	可口可樂	
cola	kělè	可乐	可樂	
cocaine	kěkǎyīn	可卡因		
cocoa	kěkě	可可		
codeine	kědàiyīn	可待因		
coffee	kāfēi	咖啡		From various sources. Loaned via American English in Shanghainese (cf. kha-fi), French in Cantonese and Mandarin (cf. gaa^{3} fe^{1}), Russian in Dungan (cf. кофе), and Malay-Indonesian or Tagalog in migrant communities in Southeast Asia.
cookie	qǔqí	曲奇		
cool	kù	酷		
copy	kǎobèi	拷贝	拷貝	Only used in the context of computers
sofa	shāfā	沙发	沙發	From Shanghainese (cf. so-faq). Doublet of 梳化
coup d'état	kǔdiédǎ	苦迭打		
craton	kèlātōng	克拉通		
cream	jìlián	忌廉		From Cantonese (cf. gei^{3} lim^{1})
cream	qílín	淇淋		Likely of Southern Chinese origin
crêpe	kělìbǐng	可丽饼	可麗餅	
croissant	kěsòng	可颂	可頌	
cumin	kūmíng	枯茗		Rarely used in mainland China, usually appears in compound words such as kūmíngqúan 枯茗醛 “cuminaldehyde”
curry	gālí	咖喱		
cyanide	shān'āi	山埃		Rarely used in mainland China
Dacron	díquèliáng	的确良	的確良	
daddy	diēdì	爹地		
didgeridoo	díjílǐdùguǎn	迪吉里杜管		
disco	dísīkě	迪斯科		
Disney	Díshìní	迪士尼		From Shanghainese (cf. diq-zy-gni)
domino	duōmǐnuò	多米诺	多米諾	
drive-thru	déláisù	得来速	得來速	
Eucalyptus	yóujiālì	尤加利		
eureka	yóulǐkǎ	尤里卡		
fan	fěnsī	粉丝	粉絲	Transliterated from plural, also a term for cellophane noodles (fensi)
fantasy	fàntèxī	范特西	范特西	Rarely used in mainland China
fascism	fǎxīsī	法西斯		
fillet	fēilì	菲力		Usually refers to filet mignon
geek	jíkè	极客	極客	
ghetto	gédōu	隔都		
go-kart	gāokǎchē	高卡车	高卡車	
golf	gāo'ěrfūqiú	高尔夫球	高爾夫球	
guitar	jítā	吉他		From Shanghainese (cf. ciq-tha)
guitar	jiétā	结他	結他	From Cantonese (cf. git^{6} taa^{1})
hacker	hēikè	黑客		
hallelujah	hālìlùyà	哈利路亚	哈里路亞	
hamburger	hànbǎobāo	汉堡包	漢堡包	From 漢堡, 'Hamburg', and 包, 'bun'
hello	hālóu, hālǎo	哈喽, 哈佬	哈嘍, 哈佬	Latter chiefly Cantonese (cf. haa^{1} lou^{5})
heroin	hǎiluòyīn	海洛因		
hippie	xīpíshì	嘻皮士		
honey	hāní	哈尼		As a term of endearment
hysteria	xiēsīdǐlǐ	歇斯底里		
humour	yōumò	幽默		
ice cream	bīngqílín	冰淇淋		
jacket	jiākè	夹克	夾克	
jacket		茄克衫	茄克衫	Chiefly Shanghainese (jia-kheq-se)
jazz	juéshì	爵士		From Shanghainese (cf. ciaq-zy)
Jeep	jípǔchē	吉普车	吉普車	
jitterbug	jítèbā	吉特巴		
karaoke	kǎlā ok (kǎlāōukēi)	卡拉OK		
karting	kǎdīngchē	卡丁车	卡丁車	
ketamine	kètāmìng	克他命		
khaki	kǎqísè	卡其色		
koala	kǎolā	考拉		
lace	lěisī	蕾丝	蕾絲	
lesbian	lěisībīan	蕾丝边	蕾絲邊	
lacquer	làkè	腊克	臘克	From Shanghainese (cf. laq-kheq)
Lamborghini	Lánbójīní	兰博基尼	蘭博基尼	
laser	léishè	镭射	鐳射	
latte	nátiě	拿铁	拿鐵	Rare in Cantonese
lemon	níngméng	柠檬	檸檬	
limbo	língbōwǔ	凌波舞		
liquor	lìkǒujiǔ	利口酒		
logic	luóji	逻辑	邏輯	
lottery	lètòu	乐透	樂透	
mankini	nánjīní	男基尼		
marathon	mǎlāsōng	马拉松	馬拉松	
margarine	màiqílín	麦淇淋	麥淇淋	Dated in mainland China
marker	mǎkèbǐ	马克笔	馬克筆	
massage	mǎshājī	马杀鸡	馬殺雞	Rarely used in mainland China
metre	mǐ	米		
meme	míyīn	迷因		
mini	mǐnǐ	迷你		
michelin	míqílín	米其林		
microphone	màikèfēng	麦克风	麥克風	From Shanghainese (cf. maq-kheq-fon)
microphone		咪高峰		Chiefly Cantonese (mai^{1} gou^{1} fung^{1})
model	mótèr	模特儿	模特兒	
modern	módēng	摩登		
mohair	mǎhǎimáo	马海毛	馬海毛	
mommy	māmi	妈咪	媽咪	
montage (film)	méngtàiqí	蒙太奇		
mosaic	mǎsàikè	马赛克	馬賽克	From Shangahinese (cf. mo-se-kheq)
motif	mǔtǐ	母体	母體	Musical motifs are known as 動機 dòngjī
motif	mú	模		Musical motifs are known as 動機 dòngjī
motor	mǎdá	马达	馬達	From Shanghainese (cf. mo-daq)
motorcycle	mótuōchē	摩托车	摩托車	
mousse	mùsī	慕斯		
mozzarella	mòzālǐlā	莫扎瑞拉	莫扎瑞拉	Used in Taiwan and Singapore
mozzarella	mǎsūlǐlā	马苏里拉	馬蘇里拉	Used in mainland China
mozzarella	mòsàlìlā	莫萨利拉	莫薩利拉	Used in Hong Kong
muffin	mǎfēn	玛芬	瑪芬	
mug	mǎkèbēi	马克杯	馬克杯	Latter chiefly Cantonese (mak^{1})
mug		唛	嘜	
mummy	mùnǎiyī	木乃伊		
Nazi	Nàcuì	纳粹	納粹	
neon	níhóng	霓虹		From Shanghainese (cf. gni-ghon)
nicotine	nígǔdīng	尼古丁		
Nylon	nílóng	尼龙	尼龍	
ohm	ōumǔ	欧姆	歐姆	
Olympics	Àolínpǐkè	奥林匹克		
opium	yāpiàn	鸦片	鴉片	
parfait	bāfēi	芭菲		
parka	pàikè dàyī	派克大衣		
party	pàiduì, pātǐ	派对, 趴体	派對, 趴體	Latter used informally
penicillin	pánníxīlín	盘尼西林	盤尼西林	Dated in mainland China
Pharaoh	fǎlǎo	法老		
pickup truck	píkǎ	皮卡		
pie	pài	派		
pizza	pīsà	披萨	披薩	
pizza	bǐsà	比萨	比薩	
pizza		匹萨	匹薩	Chiefly Shanghainese (phi-saq)
poker	pūkè	扑克	撲克	Refers to card games in general
polka	bō'ěrkǎ	波尔卡	波爾卡	
pudding	bùdīng	布丁		
pudding	bùdiān	布甸		From Cantonese (cf. bou^{3} din^{1})
pump	bèng	泵		
punk	péngkè	朋克		
rabbi	lābǐ	拉比		
radar	léidá	雷达	雷達	
romance	luómànshǐ	罗曼史	羅曼史	
romance	làngmàn	浪漫		
rum	lǎngmǔjiu	朗姆酒		
rumba	lúnbā	伦巴	倫巴	
salad	shālà	沙拉		
salad	sèlā	色拉		
salad	shālǜ	沙律		Chiefly Cantonese (cf. saa^{1} leot^{6-2})
salmon	sānwényú	三文鱼	三文魚	
salon	shālóng	沙龙	沙龍	
sandwich	sānmíngzhì	三明治		
sandwich	sānwénzhì	三文治		From Cantonese (cf. saam^{1} man^{4} zi^{6})
sardine	shādīngyú	沙丁鱼	沙丁魚	
sardine	shādiānyú	沙甸鱼	沙甸魚	Chiefly Cantonese and Penang Hokkien
sauna	sāngná	桑拿		
saxophone	sàkèsīfēng	萨克斯风	薩克斯風	From Shanghainese (cf. saq-kheq-sy-fon)
saxophone		昔士风	昔士風	Chiefly Cantonese (sik^{1} si^{6} fung^{1})
scooter	sùkèdá	速克达	速克達	Rarely used in mainland China
shampoo	xiāngbō	香波		
sherry	xuělìjiǔ	雪利酒		
shock	xīukè	休克		
sirloin	shālǎng, xīlěng	沙朗, 西冷		
snooker	sīnuòkè	斯诺克	斯諾克	
sonar	shēngnà	声呐	聲吶	
soda	sūdá	苏打	蘇打	sūdáshǔi 蘇打水 is used when referring to soft drinks, xiǎosūdá 小蘇打 is used when referring to baking soda
soda	shūdǎ	梳打	梳打	From Cantonese (cf. so^{1} daa^{2})
strawberry	-	士多啤梨		Chiefly Cantonese (si^{6} do^{1} be^{1} lei^{5})
Soviet	Sūwéi'āi	苏维埃	蘇維埃	
sundae	shèngdài	圣代	聖代	From Shanghainese (cf. sen-de)
sundae	xīndì	新地		From Cantonese (cf. san^{1} dei^{6-2})
talk show	tuōkǒuxiù	脱口秀	脫口秀	
tango	tàngē	探戈	探戈	
tank	tǎnkè	坦克		
tannic acid	dānníngsuān	单宁酸	單寧酸	
taxi		的士		Chiefly Cantonese (dik^{1} si^{6-2})
taxi		差头	差頭	Chiefly Shanghainese (tsha-deu), from English charter
tarot	tǎluó	塔罗	塔羅	
Teflon	tiěfúlóng	铁氟龙	鐵氟龍	Used primarily in Taiwan
Teflon	tèfùlóng	特富龙	特富龍	Used primarily in mainland China
T-shirt	-	T恤		Chiefly Cantonese (ti^{1} seot^{1})
telephone	délǜfēng	德律风	德律風	From Shanghainese (cf. teq-liq-fon). Dated in Standard Chinese
ten-pin bowling	bǎolíngqiú	保龄球	保齡球	
toast	tǔsī	土司		
toast	tǔsī	吐司		
toast	duōshì	多士		Chiefly Cantonese (cf. do^{1} si^{6-2})
TOEFL	tuōfú	托福		
toffee	tàifēitáng	太妃糖		From Shanghainese (cf. tha-fi)
tuna	tūnnáyú	吞拿鱼	吞拿魚	Likely from Cantonese (cf. tan^{1} naa^{4})
USB flash drive	u pán (yōupán)	U盘	U盤	Used primarily in mainland China
valve	fá	阀	閥	
Vaseline	fánshìlín	凡士林		From Shanghainese (cf. ve-zy-lin)
vitamin	wéitāmìng	维他命	維他命	Dated in mainland China
vodka	fútéjiā	伏特加		
waltz	huá'ěrzī	华尔兹	華爾茲	
watt	wǎtè	瓦特		
whisky	wēishìjì	威士忌		
X-ray	x guāng (àikèsīguāng)	X光		
yogurt	yōugé	优格	優格	Chiefly Taiwan
yo-yo	yōuyōuqiú	悠悠球		
yuppie	yǎpíshì	雅皮士		

== Malay ==
Malay	Pinyin	Chinese	Meaning	Notes
tolong	duōlóng	多隆	help	Only used in Singapore and Malaysia.
kampung	gānbǎng	甘榜	village	Only used in Singapore and Malaysia.
sagu	xīgǔmǐ	西谷米	sago (starch)	sagu + 米 (mǐ, 'grain'). Only used in Singapore and Malaysia.
tumpang	lóngbāng	隆帮	to stay with somebody	Only used in Singapore and Malaysia.
tanjung	dānróng	丹戎	cape	Only used in Singapore and Malaysia.
mangga	mángguǒ	芒果	mango	
pasar	Bāshā	巴刹	marketplace	Only used in Singapore

== See also ==
- List of English words of Chinese origin
- List of English words of Japanese origin
- List of Spanish words of Chinese origin
- List of English words of Cantonese origin
- Chinglish
- Gairaigo
- Sino-Japanese vocabulary
