= Sino-Xenic vocabularies =

Chinese-original CJKV character readings

Sino-Xenic vocabularies are large-scale and systematic borrowings of the Chinese lexicon into the Japanese, Korean and Vietnamese languages, none of which are genetically related to Chinese. The resulting Sino-Japanese, Sino-Korean and Sino-Vietnamese vocabularies now make up a large part of the lexicons of these languages. The pronunciation systems for these vocabularies originated from conscious attempts to consistently approximate the original Chinese sounds while reading Classical Chinese. They are used alongside modern varieties of Chinese in historical Chinese phonology, particularly the reconstruction of the sounds of Middle Chinese. Some other languages, such as Hmong–Mien and Kra–Dai languages, also contain large numbers of Chinese loanwords but without the systematic correspondences that characterize Sino-Xenic vocabularies.

The term was coined in 1953 by the linguist Samuel E. Martin from the Greek ξένος (xénos, 'foreign'); Martin called these borrowings "Sino-Xenic dialects".

Korean, Japanese and Vietnamese are the most widespread examples of sinoxenic languages. Indeed, these languages, by importing the Chinese writing system (sinograms), were enriched with a new vocabulary from China. Little by little, this vocabulary of the classical (written) Chinese language penetrated the vernacular languages, to the point that today, including the words invented in Japan on the basis of Sino-Japanese readings of sinograms, 49% of the words found in the Japanese dictionary Shinsen-kokugo-jiten (新選国語辞典, 2002) are Sino-xenic, without including a part of the hybrid terms (8%) which, in a number of cases, contain at least one sinoxenic element. Nevertheless, their weight in terms of frequency of use, appears clearly lower, especially in the oral language; for example, a 1995 study of television shows shows a share of only 18% for Sino-xenic vocabulary. Everyday conversations see this share reduced even further, as a trend.

== Background ==
Limited borrowing from Chinese into Vietnamese and Korean occurred during the Han dynasty. During the Tang dynasty (618–907), Chinese writing, language and culture were imported wholesale into Vietnam, Korea and Japan. Scholars in those countries wrote in Literary Chinese and were thoroughly familiar with the Chinese classics, which they read aloud in systematic local approximations of Middle Chinese. With those pronunciations, Chinese words entered Vietnamese, Korean and Japanese in huge numbers.

The plains of northern Vietnam were under Chinese control for most of the period from 111 BC to AD 938. After independence, the country adopted Literary Chinese as the language of administration and scholarship. As a result, there are several layers of Chinese loanwords in Vietnamese. The oldest loans, roughly 400 words dating from the Eastern Han, have been fully assimilated and are treated as native Vietnamese words. Sino-Vietnamese proper dates to the early Tang dynasty, when the spread of Chinese rime dictionaries and other literature resulted in the wholesale importation of the Chinese lexicon.

Isolated Chinese words also began to enter Korean from the 1st century BC, but the main influx occurred in the 7th and 8th centuries after the unification of the peninsula by Silla. The flow of Chinese words into Korean became overwhelming after the establishment of civil service examinations in 958.

Japanese has two well-preserved layers and a third that is also significant:

- Go-on readings date to the introduction of Buddhism to Japan from Korea in the 6th century. Based on the name, they are widely believed to reflect pronunciations of Jiankang in the lower Yangtze area during the late Northern and Southern dynasties period. However, this cannot be substantiated, and Go-on appears to reflect an amalgam of different Chinese varieties transmitted through Korea.
- Kan-on readings are believed to reflect the standard pronunciation of the Tang period, as used in the cities of Chang'an and Luoyang. It was transmitted directly by Japanese who studied in China.
- Tōsō-on readings were introduced by followers of Zen Buddhism in the 14th century and are thought to be based on the speech of Hangzhou.

Examples of Sino-Xenic readings
Character	Middle Chinese (Note: Transcribed using Baxter's notation. The initial h- represents a voiced fricative [ɣ] or [ɦ], while the final letters X and H represent the rising and departing tones respectively.)	Modern Chinese		Sino-Vietnamese	Sino-Korean (Note: Late Middle Korean forms in Yale romanization)	Sino-Japanese		
Character	Middle Chinese	Mandarin	Cantonese (Yale) (Note: Unlike Mandarin, Cantonese preserves the final consonants of Middle Chinese.)	Sino-Vietnamese	Sino-Korean	Go-on	Kan-on	Tōsō-on
一 'one'	'jit	yī	yāt	nhất	Gil	ichi	itsu	
二 'two'	nyijH	èr	yih	nhị	zi	ni	ji	
三 'three'	sam	sān	sāam	tam	sam	san	san	
四 'four'	sijH	sì	sei	tứ	so	shi	shi	
五 'five'	nguX	wǔ	ńgh	ngũ	Gwo	go	go	
六 'six'	ljuwk	liù	luhk	lục	lyuk	roku	riku	ryū
七 'seven'	tshit	qī	chāt	thất	chil	shichi	shitsu	
八 'eight'	peat	bā	baat	bát	phal	hachi	hatsu	
九 'nine'	kjuwX	jiǔ	gáu	cửu	kwu	ku	kyū	
十 'ten'	dzyip	shí	sahp	thập	sip	jū	shū	
百 'hundred'	paek	bǎi	baak	bách	poyk	hyaku	haku	
千 'thousand'	tshen	qiān	chīn	thiên	chen	sen	sen	
萬 '10 thousand'	mjonH	wàn	maahn	vạn	man	man	ban	
億 '100 million'	'ik	yì	yīk	ức	Gek	oku	yoku	
明 'bright'	mjaeng	míng	mìhng	minh	myeng	myō	mei	min
農 'agriculture'	nowng	nóng	nùhng	nông	nwong	nō	dō	
寧 'peaceful'	neng	níng	nìhng	ninh	nyeng	nyō	nei	
行 'walk'	haeng	xíng	hàahng	hành	hoyng	gyō	kō	an
請 'request'	tshjengX	qǐng	chéng, chíng	thỉnh	cheng	shō	sei	shin
暖 'warm'	nwanX	nuǎn	nyúhn	noãn	nan	nan	dan	non
頭 'head'	duw	tóu	tàuh	đầu	twu	zu	tō	jū
子 'child'	tsiX	zǐ	jí	tử	co	shi	shi	su
下 'down'	haeX	xià	hah	hạ	ha	ge	ka	

In contrast, vocabulary of Chinese origin in Thai, including most of the basic numerals, was borrowed over a range of periods from the Han (or earlier) to the Tang.

Since the pioneering work of Bernhard Karlgren, these bodies of pronunciations have been used together with modern varieties of Chinese in attempts to reconstruct the sounds of Middle Chinese. They provide such broad and systematic coverage that the linguist Samuel Martin called them "Sino-Xenic dialects", treating them as parallel branches with the native Chinese dialects. The foreign pronunciations sometimes retain distinctions lost in all the modern Chinese varieties, as in the case of the chongniu distinction found in Middle Chinese rime dictionaries. Similarly, the distinction between grades III and IV made by the Late Middle Chinese rime tables has disappeared in most modern varieties, but in kan-on, grade IV is represented by the Old Japanese vowels i_{1} and e_{1} while grade III is represented by i_{2} and e_{2}.

Vietnamese, Korean and Japanese scholars later adapted the Chinese script to write their languages, using Chinese characters both for borrowed and native vocabulary. Thus, in Japanese, Chinese characters may have both Sino-Japanese readings (on'yomi) and native readings (kun'yomi). Similarly, in the chữ Nôm script used for Vietnamese until the early 20th century, some Chinese characters could represent both a Sino-Vietnamese word and a native Vietnamese word with similar meaning or sound to the Chinese word, but would often be marked with a diacritic when the native reading was intended. However, in the Korean mixed script, Chinese characters (hanja) are only used for Sino-Korean words. The character-based Vietnamese and Korean scripts have since been replaced by the Vietnamese alphabet and hangul respectively, although Korean does still use Hanja to an extent.

== Sound correspondences ==
Inevitably, foreign pronunciations of these words only approximated the original Chinese, and many distinctions were lost. In particular, Korean and Japanese had far fewer consonants and much simpler syllables than Chinese, and they lacked tones. Even Vietnamese merged some Chinese initial consonants (for example, several different consonants were merged into t and th while ph corresponds to both p and f in Mandarin). A further complication is that the various borrowings are based on different local pronunciations at different periods. Nevertheless, it is common to treat the pronunciations as developments from the categories of the Middle Chinese rime dictionaries.

Middle Chinese is recorded as having eight series of initial consonants, though it is likely that no single dialect distinguished them all. Stops and affricates could also be voiced, voiceless or voiceless aspirated. Early Vietnamese had a similar three-way division, but the voicing contrast would later disappear in the tone split that affected several languages in the Mainland Southeast Asia linguistic area, including Vietnamese and most Chinese varieties. Old Japanese had only a two-way contrast based on voicing, while Middle Korean had only one obstruent at each point of articulation.

Correspondences of initial consonants
Middle Chinese		Modern Chinese	Sino-Vietnamese (Note: Graphemes are given in angle brackets.)	Sino-Korean	Sino-Japanese		
Middle Chinese		Mandarin	Sino-Vietnamese	Sino-Korean	Go-on	Kan-on	Tōsō-on
Labials	幫 p	p/f	*p > ɓ (Note: In syllables with chongniu grade IV finals (denoted as -ji- in Baxter's notation), labial stops usually shifted to dental stops in Sino-Vietnamese.) ⟨b⟩	p/pʰ (Note: In early prescriptive dictionaries, Middle Chinese aspirates always yield Sino-Korean aspirates, but in actual pronunciation aspiration is unpredictable.)	ɸ > h	ɸ > h	ɸ > h
Labials	滂 pʰ	pʰ/f	*pʰ > f ⟨ph⟩	p/pʰ	ɸ > h	ɸ > h	ɸ > h
Labials	並 b	p/pʰ/f	*b > ɓ ⟨b⟩	p/pʰ	b	ɸ > h	ɸ > h
Labials	明 m	m/w	m (Note: In syllables with chongniu grade IV finals, the Middle Chinese initial m yielded the Vietnamese initial spelled d, which was formerly *dʲ and is [z] or [j] in modern dialects.) ⟨m⟩, v ⟨v⟩	m	m	b (Note: Yields m- in syllables ending in original -ng.)	m
Dentals	端 t	t	*t > ɗ ⟨đ⟩	t/tʰ (Note: In Modern Sino-Korean, dentals [t]/[tʰ] preceding a palatal approximant [j] become palatalized as [tɕ]/[tɕʰ], respectively, e.g. 田: ttyen > cen, 定: ttyeng > ceng.)	t	t	t
Dentals	透 tʰ	tʰ	tʰ ⟨th⟩	t/tʰ	t	t	t
Dentals	定 d	t/tʰ	*d > ɗ ⟨đ⟩	t/tʰ	d	t	t
Dentals	泥 n	n	*n > n ⟨n⟩	n	n	d (Note: Yields n- in syllables ending in original -ng.)	n
Dentals	來 l	l	*l > l ⟨l⟩	l	r	r	r
Retroflex stops	知 ʈ	ʈʂ	*ʈ > ʈʂ ⟨tr⟩	t/tʰ	t	t	s
Retroflex stops	徹 ʈʰ	ʈʂʰ	*ʂ > ʂ ⟨s⟩	t/tʰ	t	t	s
Retroflex stops	澄 ɖ	ʈʂ/ʈʂʰ	*ɖ > ʈʂ ⟨tr⟩	t/tʰ	d	t	s
Dental sibilants	精 ts	ts (Note: In Standard Chinese, dental sibilants [ts]/[tsʰ]/[s] and velars [k]/[kʰ]/[x] preceding vocalic and non-vocalic [i]/[y] merge into [tɕ]/[tɕʰ]/[ɕ], respectively, e.g. 青: cīng > qīng, 卻: küè > què.)	*s > t ⟨t⟩	tɕ/tɕʰ	s	s	s
Dental sibilants	清 tsʰ	tsʰ	*ɕ > tʰ ⟨th⟩	tɕ/tɕʰ	s	s	s
Dental sibilants	從 dz	ts/tsʰ	*s > t ⟨t⟩	tɕ/tɕʰ	z	s	s
Dental sibilants	心 s	s	*s > t ⟨t⟩	s	s	s	s
Dental sibilants	邪 z	s	*s > t ⟨t⟩	s	z	s	s
Retroflex sibilants	莊 ʈʂ	ʈʂ	*ʈ > ʈʂ ⟨tr⟩	tɕ/tɕʰ	s	s	s
Retroflex sibilants	初 ʈʂʰ	ʈʂʰ	*ʂ > ʂ ⟨s⟩	tɕ/tɕʰ	s	s	s
Retroflex sibilants	崇 ɖʐ	ʈʂ/ʈʂʰ	*ʂ > ʂ ⟨s⟩	s/tɕ/tɕʰ	z	s	s
Retroflex sibilants	生 ʂ	ʂ	*ʂ > ʂ ⟨s⟩	s	s	s	s
Palatals	章 tɕ	ʈʂ	*c > tɕ ⟨ch⟩	tɕ/tɕʰ	s	s	s
Palatals	昌 tɕʰ	ʈʂʰ	*tʃ > s ⟨x⟩	tɕ/tɕʰ	s	s	s
Palatals	禪 dʑ	ʈʂ/ʈʂʰ	*ɕ > tʰ ⟨th⟩	s	z	s	s
Palatals	書 ɕ	ʂ	*ɕ > tʰ ⟨th⟩	s	s	s	s
Palatals	船 ʑ	ʂ	*ɕ > tʰ ⟨th⟩	s	z	s	s
Palatals	日 ɲ	ʐ~ɻ or syllable əɻ	ɲ ⟨nh⟩	z > ∅	n	z	z
Palatals	以 j	j	z~j ⟨d⟩	j	j	j	j
Velars	見 k	k	k ⟨k/c/q⟩, *ʝ > z~j ⟨gi⟩	k/h	k	k	k
Velars	溪 kʰ	kʰ	kʰ ⟨kh⟩	k/h	k	k	k
Velars	群 ɡ	k/kʰ	k ⟨k/c/q⟩	k	g	k	k
Velars	疑 ŋ	∅/n	ŋ ⟨ng⟩	ŋ > ∅	g	g	g
Laryngeals	影 ʔ	∅	*ʔ > ∅	ʔ > ∅	∅	∅	∅
Laryngeals	曉 x	x	h ⟨h⟩	h	k	k	∅
Laryngeals	匣 ɣ	x	h ⟨h⟩, v ⟨v⟩	h	ɣ > g/w > g/∅	k	∅

The Middle Chinese final consonants were semivowels (or glides) /j/ and /w/, nasals /m/, /n/ and /ŋ/, and stops /p/, /t/ and /k/. Sino-Vietnamese and Sino-Korean preserve all the distinctions between final nasals and stops, like southern Chinese varieties such as Yue. Sino-Vietnamese has added allophonic distinctions to -ng and -k, based on whether the preceding vowel is front (-nh, -ch) or back (-ng, -c). Although Old Korean had a /t/ coda, words with the Middle Chinese coda /t/ have /l/ in Sino-Korean, reflecting a northern variety of Late Middle Chinese in which final /t/ had weakened to /r/.

In go-on and kan-on, the Middle Chinese coda -ng yielded a nasalized vowel, which in combination with the preceding vowel has become a long vowel in modern Japanese. For example, Tōkyō 東京, is Dōngjīng in Mandarin Chinese. Also, as Japanese cannot end words with consonants (except for moraic n), borrowings of Middle Chinese words ending in a stop had a paragoge added so that, for example, Middle Chinese kwok (國) was borrowed as koku. The later, less common Tōsō-on borrowings, however, reflect the reduction of final stops in Lower Yangtze Mandarin varieties to a glottal stop, reflected by Japanese /Q/.

Correspondences of final consonants
Middle Chinese	Modern Chinese	Sino-Vietnamese	Sino-Korean	Sino-Japanese		
Middle Chinese	Mandarin	Sino-Vietnamese	Sino-Korean	Go-on	Kan-on	Tōsō-on
-m	n	m ⟨m⟩	m	/ɴ/	/ɴ/	/ɴ/
-n	n	n ⟨n⟩	n	/ɴ/	/ɴ/	/ɴ/
-ng	ŋ	ŋ ⟨ng⟩/ɲ ⟨nh⟩	ŋ	ũ/ĩ (Note: ĩ after -e- and ũ after other vowels) > u/i	ũ/ĩ > u/i	/ɴ/
-p	∅	p ⟨p⟩	p	ɸu > u	ɸu > u	/Q/
-t	∅	t ⟨t⟩	l	ti > chi	tu > tsu	/Q/
-k	∅	k ⟨k⟩/ʲk ⟨ch⟩	k	ku/ki (Note: ki after -i- and ku after other vowels)	ku/ki	/Q/

Middle Chinese had a three-way tonal contrast in syllables with vocalic or nasal endings. As Japanese is atonal, Sino-Japanese borrowings preserve no trace of Chinese tones. Most Middle Chinese tones were preserved in the tones of Middle Korean, but they have since been lost in all but a few dialects. By contrast, Sino-Vietnamese reflects the Chinese tones fairly faithfully, including the Late Middle Chinese split of each tone into two registers conditioned by voicing of the initial. The correspondence to the Chinese rising and departing tones is reversed from the earlier loans, so the Vietnamese hỏi and ngã tones reflect the Chinese upper and lower rising tone while the sắc and nặng tones reflect the upper and lower departing tone. Unlike northern Chinese varieties, Sino-Vietnamese places level-tone words with sonorant and glottal stop initials in the upper level (ngang) category.

== Structural effects ==
Large numbers of Chinese words were borrowed into Vietnamese, Korean and Japanese and still form a large and important part of their lexicons.

In the case of Japanese, the influx has led to changes in the phonological structure of the language. Old Japanese syllables had the form (C)V, with vowel sequences being avoided. To accommodate the Chinese loanwords, syllables were extended with glides as in myō, vowel sequences as in mei, geminate consonants and a final nasal, leading to the moraic structure of later Japanese. Voiced sounds (b, d, z, g and r) were now permitted in word-initial position, where they had previously been impossible.

In Middle Korean, the influx of Chinese vocabulary contributed to the development of tones, which are still present in some dialects. Sino-Korean words have also disrupted the native structure in which l does not occur in word-initial position, and words show vowel harmony.

Chinese morphemes have been used extensively in all these languages to coin compound words for new concepts in a similar way to the use of Latin and Greek roots in English. Many new compounds, or new meanings for old phrases, were created in the late 19th and early 20th centuries to name Western concepts and artifacts. The coinages, written in shared Chinese characters, have then been borrowed freely between languages. They have even been accepted into Chinese, a language usually resistant to loanwords, because their foreign origin was hidden by their written form. Often, different compounds for the same concept were in circulation for some time before a winner emerged, and sometimes, the final choice differed between countries.

The proportion of vocabulary of Chinese origin thus tends to be greater in technical, scientific, abstract or formal language or registers. For example, Sino-Japanese words account for about 35% of the words in entertainment magazines (where borrowings from English are common), compared with over half the words in newspapers and 60% of the words in science magazines.

== See also ==
- Chinese family of scripts
- East Asian languages
- Mainland Southeast Asia linguistic area
- Non-Sinoxenic pronunciations
- Brushtalk

=== Other languages ===
- Church Slavonic § Recensions, for the similar practice in Eastern Orthodox communities when pronouncing the Church Slavonic language.
- Pronunciation of Ancient Greek in teaching, for the similar practice in Europe when pronouncing the Ancient Greek language.
- Latin regional pronunciation, for the similar practice in several European countries when pronouncing the Latin language.
- Cultism (linguistics) and Semicultism, about the words whose morphology follows strictly and closely respectively the classic languages such as Latin and Greek.
