= Sino-Vietnamese vocabulary =

Morphemes borrowed into Vietnamese from Literary Chinese

Sino-Vietnamese vocabulary (Vietnamese: từ Hán Việt (IPA: [tɯ̀ hǎn viə̂ˀt]), Chữ Hán: 詞漢越, 'Chinese-Vietnamese words') is a layer of about 3,000 monosyllabic morphemes of the Vietnamese language borrowed from Literary Chinese with consistent pronunciations based on Middle Chinese. Compounds using these morphemes are used extensively in cultural and technical vocabulary. Together with Sino-Korean and Sino-Japanese vocabularies, Sino-Vietnamese has been used in the reconstruction of the sound categories of Middle Chinese. Samuel Martin grouped the three together as "Sino-Xenic". There is also an Old Sino-Vietnamese layer consisting of a few hundred words borrowed individually from Chinese in earlier periods, which are treated by speakers as native words. More recent loans from southern Chinese languages, usually names of foodstuffs such as lạp xưởng 'Chinese sausage' (from Cantonese 臘腸; 腊肠; laahpchéung), are not treated as Sino-Vietnamese but more direct borrowings.

Estimates of the proportion of words of Sinitic origin in the Vietnamese lexicon vary from one third to half and even to 70%. The proportion tends towards the lower end in speech and towards the higher end in technical writing. In the famous Từ điển tiếng Việt dictionary by Vietnamese linguist Hoàng Phê, about 40% of the vocabulary is of Sinitic origin.

== Monosyllabic loanwords ==
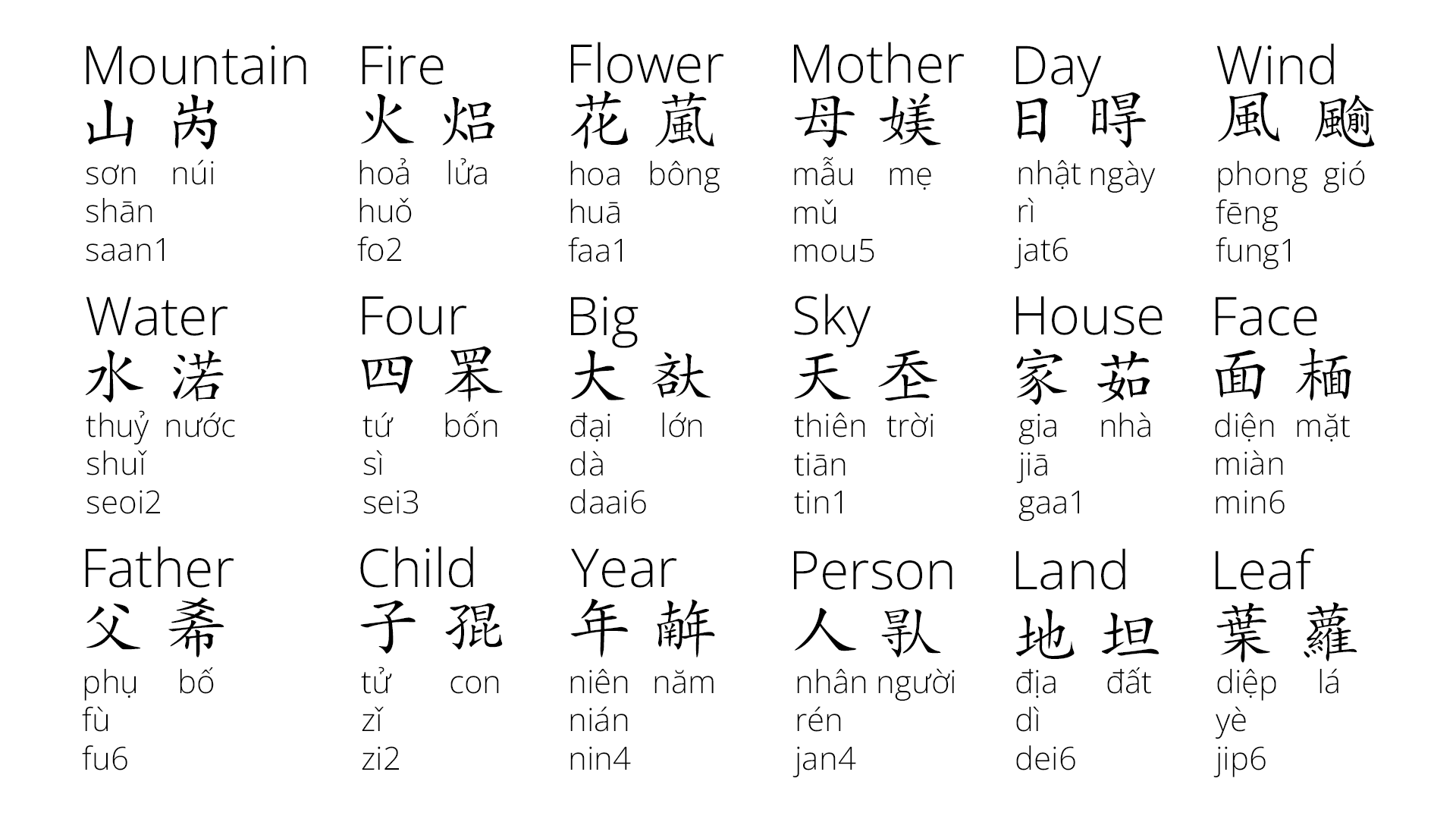
A comparison between Sino-Vietnamese (left) vocabulary with Mandarin and Cantonese pronunciations below and native Vietnamese vocabulary (right).

As a result of a thousand years of Chinese control, a small number of Sinitic words were borrowed into Vietnamese, called Old Sino-Vietnamese layer. Furthermore, a thousand years of use of Literary Chinese after independence, a considerable number of Sinitic words were borrowed, called the Sino-Vietnamese layer. These layers were first systematically studied by linguist Wang Li.

The ancestor of the Vietic languages was atonal and sesquisyllabic, featured many consonant clusters, and made use of affixes. The northern Vietic varieties ancestral to Vietnamese and Muong have long been in contact with Tai languages and Chinese as part of a zone of convergence known as the Mainland Southeast Asia linguistic area. As a result, most languages of this area, including Middle Chinese and Vietnamese, are analytic, with almost all morphemes monosyllabic and lacking inflection. The phonological structure of their syllables is also similar. Traces of the original consonant clusters can be found in materials from the 17th century, but have disappeared from modern Vietnamese.

The Old Sino-Vietnamese layer was introduced after the Chinese conquest of the kingdom of Nanyue, including the northern part of Vietnam, in 111 BC. The influence of the Chinese language was particularly felt during the Eastern Han period (25–190 AD), due to increased Chinese immigration and official efforts to sinicize the territory. This layer consists of roughly 400 words, which have been fully assimilated and are treated by Vietnamese speakers as native words. It has also been theorised that some Old-Sino-Vietnamese words came from a language shift from a population of Annamese Middle Chinese speakers that lived in the Red River Delta, in northern Vietnam, to proto-Viet-Muong.

The much more extensive Sino-Vietnamese proper was introduced with Chinese rhyme dictionaries such as the Qieyun in the late Tang dynasty (618–907). Vietnamese scholars used a systematic rendering of Middle Chinese within the phonology of Vietnamese to derive consistent pronunciations for the entire Chinese lexicon. After driving out the Chinese in 880, the Vietnamese sought to build a state on the Chinese model, using Literary Chinese for all formal writing, including administration and scholarship, until the early 20th century. Around 3,000 words entered Vietnamese over this period. Some of these were re-introductions of words borrowed at the Old Sino-Vietnamese stage, with different pronunciations due to intervening sound changes in Vietnamese and Chinese, and often with a shift in meaning.

Examples of multiple-borrowed Sinitic words
Chinese (Old > Middle)	Old Sino-Vietnamese	Sino-Vietnamese
味 *mjəts > mjɨjH	mùi [mùj] 'smell, odor'	vị [vǐˀ] 'flavor, taste'
本 *pənʔ > pwonX	vốn [vǒn] 'capital, funds'	bản [ɓân] 'root, foundation'
役 *wjek > ywek	việc [viə̌ˀk] 'work, event'	dịch [zǐˀc] 'service, corvee'
帽 *muks > mawH	mũ [mǔˀ] 'hat'	mạo [mâˀw] 'hat'
鞋 *gre > hɛ	giày [ʑàːj] 'shoe'	hài [hàːj] 'shoe'
嫁 *kras > kæH	gả [ɣǎˀ] 'marry'	giá [zǎː] 'marry'
婦 *bjəʔ > bjuwX	vợ [vɤ̂ʔ] 'wife' (Note: Shorto considers vợ a native Vietnamese word, inherited from Proto-Mon-Khmer *(ʔ)boʔ "mother"; Haudricourt proposes that 婦 *bjəʔ's Old Sino-Vietnamese reflex is bụa in the compound goá bụa < Old Chinese 寡婦 kʷraːʔ-bjəʔ > Late Sino-Vietnamese quả phụ.)	phụ [fûˀ] 'woman'
跪 *gjojʔ > gjweX	cúi [kǔj] 'bow, prostrate oneself'	quỳ [kɥì] 'kneel'
禮 *rijʔ > lejX	lạy [lâˀj] 'kowtow'	lễ [lěˀ] 'ceremony'
法 *pjap > pjop	phép [fɛ̌p] 'rule, law'	pháp [fǎːp] 'rule, law'

Wang Li followed Henri Maspero in identifying a problematic group of forms with "softened" initials g-, gi, d- and v- as Sino-Vietnamese loans that had been affected by changes in colloquial Vietnamese. Most scholars now follow André-Georges Haudricourt in assigning these words to the Old Sino-Vietnamese layer.

Sino-Vietnamese shows a number of distinctive developments from Middle Chinese:

- Sino-Vietnamese distinguishes Early Middle Chinese palatal and retroflex sibilants, which are identified in all modern Chinese languages, and had already merged by the Late Middle Chinese period.
- Sino-Vietnamese reflects Late Middle Chinese labiodental initials, which were not distinguished from labial stops at the Early Middle Chinese phase.
- Middle Chinese grade II finals yield a palatal medial -y- like northern Chinese languages but unlike southern ones. For example, Middle Chinese 交 kæw yields SV giao, Cantonese gaau and Beijing jiāo.

== Modern compounds ==
Up until the early 20th century, Literary Chinese was the vehicle of administration and scholarship, not only in China, but also in Vietnam, Korea and Japan, similar to Latin in medieval Europe. Though not a spoken language, this shared written language was read aloud in different places according to local traditions derived from Middle Chinese pronunciation: the literary readings in various parts of China and Sino-Xenic pronunciations in the other countries.

As contact with the West grew, Western works were translated into Literary Chinese and read by the literate. In order to translate words for new concepts (political, religious, scientific, medical and technical terminology) scholars in these countries coined new compounds formed from Chinese morphemes and written with Chinese characters. The local readings of these compounds were readily adopted into the respective local vernaculars of Japan, Korea and Vietnam. For example, the Chinese mathematician Li Shanlan created hundreds of translations of mathematical terms, including 代數學 ('replace-number-study') for 'algebra', yielding modern Mandarin dàishùxué, Vietnamese đại số học, Japanese daisūgaku and Korean daesuhak. Often, multiple compounds for the same concept were in circulation for some time before a winner emerged, with the final choice sometimes differing between countries.

A fairly large amount of Sino-Vietnamese compounds have meanings that differ significantly from their usage in other Sinitic vocabularies. For example:

- bác sĩ (博士) is widely used with the meaning 'physician' or 'medical doctor', while in Mandarin it refers to a doctoral degree;
- tiến sĩ (進士) is used to refer to 'doctoral degree', whilst in Mandarin it is used to refer to 'successful candidate in the highest imperial civil service examination'.
- bạc 鉑 'silver' is the Old Sino-Vietnamese reflex of Old Chinese *bra:g 白 'white', cognate with later Sino-Vietnamese bạch 'white' and Non-Sino-Vietnamese bệch '(of complexion) chalky', yet in Mandarin 鉑 means 'thin sheet of metal' (variants: 箔, 薄) and 鉑 (pinyin: bó) has also acquired the meaning 'platinum', whose Sino-Vietnamese name is 白金 bạch kim, literally 'white gold';
- luyện kim (煉金) means 'metallurgy' instead of its original meaning, 'alchemy';
- giáo sư (教師) means 'teacher' in Mandarin, but is now associated with 'professor' in Vietnamese.
- English "club" became 俱樂部 kurabu in Japan, was borrowed to China, then to Vietnam, is read as câu lạc bộ, and abbreviated CLB, which can be an abbreviation for club.
- linh miêu (靈貓) means 'civet' in Mandarin but means 'lynx' in Vietnamese.
- ân nghĩa ~ ơn nghĩa (恩義) not only retains its original Sinitic meaning "feeling of gratitude" but also acquires the extended meaning "favor, kindness".
- thời tiết (時節) is used with the meaning of 'weather", while in Mandarin, it means a 'season' (mainly refers to a specific period of time, often within the context of a particular season).
- thư viện (書院) means 'library' in Vietnamese, but in Mandarin, it refers to a 'study room' or an 'academy'.
- phương phi (芳菲) is an adjective meaning 'fat' or 'corpulent', but in Mandarin, it means 'fragrant' or 'fresh-smelling'.
- ung thư (癰疽) means 'cancer' in Vietnamese, but in Mandarin, it is a term used in traditional Chinese medicine meaning a 'skin abscess'.
- thập phân (十分) means 'decimal' in Vietnamese, but in Mandarin, it means 'very'; 'extremely'.
- thương (傷) has the meaning 'to like, to love', while also sharing the common meaning of 'to (be) injured, wounded' with Mandarin.
- thư (書) refers to a letter, while in Mandarin, it means book. (Vietnamese uses sách (冊) instead)

There also a significant amount of Sino-Vietnamese compounds that are used, but the terms differ in different Sinosphere languages. Such as:

English	Vietnamese	Mandarin	Cantonese	Japanese	Korean
university student	sinh viên 生員	大學生/大学生 dàxuéshēng	大學生/大学生 daaihhohksāang	大学生 daigakusei	대학생 (大學生) daehaksaeng
professor	giáo sư 教師	教授 jiàoshòu	教授 gaausauh	教授 kyōju	교수 (敎授) gyosu
bachelor (academic degree)	cử nhân 舉人	學士/学士 xuéshì	學士/学士 hohksih	学士 gakushi	학사 (學士) haksa
doctorate (academic degree)	tiến sĩ 進士	博士 bóshì	博士 boksih	博士 hakushi	박사 (博士) baksa
library	thư viện 書院	圖書館/图书馆 túshūguǎn	圖書館/图书馆 tòuhsyūgún	図書館 toshokan	도서관 (圖書館) doseogwan
office	văn phòng 文房	事務所/事务所 shìwùsuǒ	事務所/事务所 sihmouhsó	事務所 jimusho	사무소 (事務所) samuso
map	bản đồ 版圖	地圖/地图 dìtú	地圖/地图 deihtòuh	地図 chizu	지도 (地圖) jido
clock	đồng hồ 銅壺	鐘/钟 zhōng, 時計/时计 (literary) shíjì	鍾/钟 jūng	時計 tokei	시계 (時計) sigye
hotel; inn	khách sạn 客棧	酒店 jiǔdiàn, 旅館/旅馆 lǚguǎn	酒店 jáudim, 旅館/旅馆 léuihgún	ホテル hoteru, 旅館 (traditional inn) ryokan	여관 (旅館) yeogwan
demonstration	biểu tình 表情	示威 shìwēi	示威 sihwāi	示威 jii	시위 (示威) siwi
autism	tự kỷ 自己	自閉症/自闭症 zìbìzhèng	自閉症/自闭症 jihbaijing	自閉症 jiheishō	자폐증 (自閉症) japyejeung

=== Self-coined Sino-Vietnamese compounds ===
Some Sino-Vietnamese compounds are entirely invented by the Vietnamese and are not used in any Chinese languages, such as linh mục 'priest' from 靈 'soul' and 牧 'shepherd', or giả kim thuật (假金術 'art of artificial metal'), which has been applied popularly to refer to 'alchemy'. Another example is linh cẩu (靈狗, 'alert dog') meaning 'hyena'. Others are no longer used in modern Chinese languages or have other meanings.

Definition	Chinese characters	Vietnamese alphabet
farm	莊寨	trang trại
city	城庯	thành phố
week	旬禮	tuần lễ
to be present at	現面	hiện diện
to entertain	解智	giải trí
to lack	少寸	thiếu thốn
to be proud	倖面	hãnh diện
pleasant to the eyes	玩目	ngoạn mục
orderly; proper	眞方	chân phương
(polite, respectful) you	貴位	quý vị
traditional	古傳	cổ truyền
festival	禮會	lễ hội
legend	玄話	huyền thoại
to satisfy	妥滿	thoả mãn
polite	歷事	lịch sự
important; significant	關重	quan trọng
millionaire	兆富	triệu phú
billionaire	秭富	tỷ phú
thermometer	熱計	nhiệt kế
(mathematics) matrix	魔陣	ma trận
biology	生學	sinh học
average	中平	trung bình
cosmetics	美品	mỹ phẩm
surgery	剖術	phẫu thuật
allergy	異應	dị ứng
hearing-impaired	欠聽	khiếm thính
bacteria; microbe; germ	微蟲	vi trùng
to update	及日	cập nhật
data; information	與料	dữ liệu
forum	演壇	diễn đàn
a smoothie (drink)	生素	sinh tố
dojo; martial art school	武堂	võ đường
cemetery	義地	nghĩa địa
a surgical mask	口裝	khẩu trang
thermometer	熱計	nhiệt kế
television (medium)	傳形	truyền hình
broadcast	發聲	phát thanh
animation	活形	hoạt hình
subtitles	附題	phụ đề
to transcribe	翻音	phiên âm
to transliterate	轉字	chuyển tự
visa	視實	thị thực
(informal) nurse; a medical assistant	醫佐	y tá
a specialist in humanities; an artist, painter, musician, actor, comic, etc.	藝士	nghệ sĩ
a singer	歌士	ca sĩ
a musician, especially a songwriter or a composer	樂士	nhạc sĩ
a poet	詩士	thi sĩ
a dentist	牙士	nha sĩ
an artist (painter)	畫士	hoạ sĩ
a member of any legislative body.	議士	nghị sĩ
victim	難人	nạn nhân
special forces	特攻	đặc công

== Proper names ==
Since Sino-Vietnamese provides a Vietnamese form for almost all Chinese characters, it can be used to derive a Vietnamese form for any Chinese word or name. For example, the name of Chinese leader Xi Jinping consists of the Chinese characters 習近平. Applying Sino-Vietnamese reading to each character yields the Vietnamese translation of his name, Tập Cận Bình.

Some Western names and words, approximated to Chinese languages often through Mandarin or in some cases approximated in Japanese and then borrowed into Chinese languages, were further approximated in Vietnamese. For example, Portugal is transliterated as 葡萄牙 (pinyin: Pútáoyá; Cantonese Yale: Pòuhtòuhngàh) and becomes Bồ Đào Nha in Vietnamese. England (英格蘭; Yīnggélán; Yīnggaaklàahn) became Anh Cát Lợi (英吉利), shortened to Anh (英), while United States became Mỹ Lợi Gia (美利加), shortened to Mỹ (美). The formal name for the United States in Vietnamese is Hoa Kỳ (花旗); this is a former Sinitic name of the United States and translates literally as "flower flag".

Country	Sinitic name	Mandarin Pinyin	Cantonese Yale	Vietnamese name
Australia	澳大利亞	Àodàlìyǎ	Oudaaihleih'a	Úc (澳)
Austria	奧地利	Àodìlì	Oudeihleih	Áo (奧)
Belgium	比利時	Bǐlìshí	Béileihsìh	Bỉ (比) (Note: 比 (tỉ) is read with the alternative reading of bỉ.)
Czechia	捷克	Jiékè	Jithāak	Tiệp Khắc (捷克)
France	法蘭西 (Note: Before borrowing this name from Mandarin, Vietnamese had used Phật Lãng Sa 弗朗沙 (a misreading of Phất Lãng Sa) and Phú Lãng Sa 富浪沙. Phú Lãng Sa was used in the treaty of Saigon (1862), 今大富浪沙國大皇帝、大衣坡儒國大皇帝、大南國大皇帝切願將三國不協之處調和，以敦永好。)	Fǎlánxī (China), Fàlánxī (Taiwan)	Faatlàahnsāi	Pháp (法)
Germany	德意志	Déyìzhì	Dākyiji	Đức (德)
Italy	意大利	Yìdàlì	Yidaaihleih	Ý (意)
Netherlands	荷蘭 (from 'Holland', a misnomer)	Hélán	Hòhlāan	Hà Lan (荷蘭)
Prussia	普魯士	Púlǔshì	Póulóuhsih	Phổ (普)
Russia	俄羅斯	Éluósī	Ngòhlòhsī	Nga (俄)
Spain	西班牙 (Note: Vietnamese had used "Y Pha Nho" (衣坡儒) before adopting Tây Ban Nha.)	Xībānyá	Sāibāanngàh	Tây Ban Nha (西班牙)
Yugoslavia	南斯拉夫	Nán Sīlāfū	Nàahm Sīlāaifū	Nam Tư (南斯)

Except for the oldest and most deeply ingrained Sino-Vietnamese names, modern Vietnamese instead uses direct phonetic transliterations for foreign names, in order to preserve the original spelling and pronunciation. Today, the written form of such transliterated names are almost always left unaltered; with rising levels of proficiency in English spelling and pronunciation in Vietnam, readers generally no longer need to be instructed on the correct pronunciation for common foreign names. For example, while the Sino-Vietnamese Luân Đôn remains in common usage in Vietnamese, the English equivalent London is also commonplace. Calques have also arisen to replace some Sino-Vietnamese terms. For example, the White House is usually referred to as Nhà Trắng (literally, "white house") in Vietnam, though Tòa Bạch Ốc (based on 白屋) retains some currency among overseas Vietnamese.

However, China-specific names such as Trung Quốc (Middle Kingdom, 中國), as well as Korean names with Chinese roots, continue to be rendered in Sino-Vietnamese rather than the romanization systems used in other languages. Examples include Triều Tiên (Joseon, 朝鮮) for both Korea as a whole and North Korea in particular, Hàn Quốc (Hanguk, 韓國) for South Korea, Bình Nhưỡng (Pyongyang, 平壤), and Bàn Môn Điếm (Panmunjom, 板門店). Seoul, unlike most Korean place names, has no corresponding hanja; it is therefore phonetically transliterated as Xê-un.

== Usage ==
Sino-Vietnamese words have a status similar to that of Latin-based words in English: they are used more in formal context than in everyday life. Because Chinese languages and Vietnamese use different order for subject and modifier, compound Sino-Vietnamese words or phrases might appear ungrammatical in Vietnamese sentences. For example, the Sino-Vietnamese phrase bạch mã (白馬 "white horse") can be expressed in Vietnamese as ngựa trắng ("horse white"). For this reason, compound words containing native Vietnamese and Sino-Vietnamese words are very rare and are considered improper by some. For example, chung cư ("apartment building") was originally derived from chúng cư 眾居 ("multiple dwelling"), but with the syllable chúng "multiple" replaced with chung, a "pure" Vietnamese word meaning "shared" or "together". Similarly, the literal translation of "United States", Hợp chúng quốc (合眾國) is commonly mistakenly rendered as Hợp chủng quốc, with chúng (眾 - many) replaced by chủng (種 - ethnicity, race). Another example is tiệt diện (截面; "cross-section") being replaced by tiết diện (節面).

One interesting example is the current motto of Vietnam : "Cộng hòa Xã hội chủ nghĩa Việt Nam / Độc lập – Tự do – Hạnh phúc", in which all the words are Sino-Vietnamese (獨立 – 自由 – 幸福).

Writing Sino-Vietnamese words with the Vietnamese alphabet causes some confusion about the origins of some terms, due to the large number of homophones in Sino-Vietnamese. For example, both 明 (bright) and 冥 (dark) are read as minh, thus the word "minh" has two contradictory meanings: bright and dark (although the "dark" meaning is now esoteric and is used in only a few compound words). Perhaps for this reason, the Vietnamese name for Pluto is not Minh Vương Tinh (冥王星 – lit. "underworld king star") as in other East Asian languages, but is Diêm Vương Tinh (閻王星) and sao Diêm Vương, named after the Hindu and Buddhist deity Yama. During the Hồ dynasty, Vietnam was officially known as Đại Ngu (大虞 "Great Peace"). However, most modern Vietnamese know ngu (愚) as "stupid"; consequently, some misinterpret it as "Big Idiot". Conversely, the Han River in South Korea is often erroneously translated as sông Hàn (韓) when it should be sông Hán (漢) due to the name's similarity with the country name. However, the homograph/homophone problem is not as serious as it appears, because although many Sino-Vietnamese words have multiple meanings when written with the Vietnamese alphabet, usually only one has widespread usage, while the others are relegated to obscurity. Furthermore, Sino-Vietnamese words are usually not used alone, but in compound words, thus the meaning of the compound word is preserved even if individually each has multiple meanings.

Today Sino-Vietnamese texts are learnt and used mostly only by Buddhist monks since important texts such as the scriptures to pacify spirits (recited during the ritual for the Seventh Lunar month - Trai đàn Chẩn tế; 齋壇振濟) are still recited in Sino-Vietnamese pronunciations. Such as the chant, Nam mô A Di Đà Phật coming from 南無阿彌陀佛.

=== Naming taboo ===
Naming taboos were historically practiced in Vietnam. Due to this practice, some Sino-Vietnamese readings were changed to avoid the uttering the taboo name.

Chinese Character	Original Reading	Deviated Reading	Name
承	Thằng	Thừa	Trần Thừa (陳承)
利	Lị	Lợi	Lê Lợi (黎利)
黄	Hoàng	Huỳnh	Nguyễn Hoàng (阮潢)
金/今	Câm	Kim	Nguyễn Kim (阮淦)
周	Chu	Châu	Nguyễn Phúc Chu (阮福淍)
映	Ánh	Yếng	Nguyễn Phúc Ánh (阮福暎)
時	Thì	Thời	Nguyễn Phúc Thì (阮福時)
山	San	Sơn	Nguyễn Phúc Vĩnh San (阮福永珊)

== See also ==
- Chữ Nôm (historical writing system modelled on Chinese characters)
- History of writing in Vietnam
- Stratum (linguistics)
