= List of Chinese dictionaries =

Notable Chinese dictionaries, past and present, include:

| Title | Year | Notes |
|---|---|---|
| ABC Chinese-English Dictionary | 1996 | First Chinese dictionary collated in single-sort alphabetical order of pinyin, John DeFrancis |
| A Chinese-English Dictionary | 1892 | Herbert Allen Giles' bestselling dictionary, 2nd ed. 1912 |
| A Dictionary of the Chinese Language | 1815–1823 | First Chinese-English, English-Chinese dictionary, Robert Morrison |
| A Syllabic Dictionary of the Chinese Language | 1874 | First Chinese-English dictionary to include regional pronunciations, Samuel Wells Williams |
| Cangjiepian | 220 BC (Qin) | Small Seal Script orthographic primer, Li Si's language reform |
| CEDICT | 1997–present | Paul Denisowski's text file project modeled on Japanese EDICT dictionary |
| CFDICT | 2010–present | David Houstin's text file project modeled on English CEDICT dictionary |
| Chinese and English Dictionary | 1842 | Walter Henry Medhurst |
| Chinese-English Dictionary of Modern Usage | 1972 (Hong Kong) | Lin Yutang |
| Cihai | 1938–2009 (ROC, PRC) | Popular modern general-purpose encyclopedic dictionary, 6 editions |
| Ciyuan | 1915–1984 (ROC, PRC) | First major 20th-century encyclopedic dictionary, 3 editions and 3 supplements |
| Concise Dictionary of Spoken Chinese | 1947 | Yuen Ren Chao's and Yang Lien-sheng's first Chinese dictionary for spoken language |
| Dai Kan-Wa Jiten | 1955–1960, 2000 (Japan) | Tetsuji Morohashi's Chinese-Japanese character dictionary, 50,305 entries |
| Erya | 250 BC (Warring States) | Oldest extant Chinese dictionary, semantic field collation, one of the Thirteen Classics |
| Fangyan | 15 BC (Han) | Yang Xiong, first dictionary of Chinese regional varieties |
| Le Grand Ricci (or Grand dictionnaire Ricci de la langue chinoise) | 2001, DVD 2010 | 7 volume Chinese-French dictionary, 13,500 characters and about 300,000 entries of terms and expressions. |
| Ganlu Zishu | 750 (Tang) | First orthography dictionary of the regular script |
| Grammata Serica Recensa | 1957 (Sweden) | Bernhard Karlgren's groundbreaking Old and Middle Chinese-English dictionary |
| Great Dictionary of Modern Chinese Dialects | 2002 (PRC) | Compendium of dictionaries for 42 local varieties of Chinese |
| Guangya | 230 (Cao Wei) | Zhang Yi's supplement to the Erya |
| Guangyun | 1008 (Song) | Rime dictionary expansion of Qieyun, source for reconstruction of Middle Chinese |
| Han-Han Dae Sajeon | 2008 (South Korea) | Korean hanja-to-hangul dictionary, 53,667 character entries |
| Hanyu Da Cidian | 1986–1993 (PRC) | Highly respected modern word/phase dictionary, diachronically collated, over 23,000 character entries |
| Hanyu Da Zidian | 1986–1989, 2010 (PRC) | Highly respected modern character dictionary, 60,370 entries |
| Jijiupian | 40 BC (Han) | Oldest extant orthographic primer, rhymed lines |
| Jingdian Shiwen | 580 (Tang) | Lu Deming's exegetical dictionary for Chinese classic texts |
| Jiyun | 1037 (Song) | Rime dictionary expansion of the Guangyun, 53,525 head characters |
| Kangxi Dictionary | 1716 (Qing) | Kangxi era character dictionary, 47,000 entries, see also List of 214 Kangxi radicals |
| Leipian | 1066 (Song) | Sima Guang's expansion of the Yupian, 31,319 character entries, 544 radicals |
| Longkan Shoujian | 997 (Liao) | Buddhist dictionary of pronunciations and meanings, 26,000 characters, radical and phonetic indexes |
| Mathews' Chinese-English Dictionary | 1931 | Robert Henry Mathews, 2nd ed. 1943 |
| Menggu Ziyun | 1308 (Yuan) | Only example of 'Phags-pa script-Chinese dictionary, 813 entries |
| Pearl in the Palm | 1048 (Western Xia) | First Chinese-Tangut language bilingual dictionary |
| Peiwen Yunfu | 1711 (Qing) | Rime dictionary of literary phrases, 10,257 entries arranged by 106 rimes |
| Pentaglot Dictionary | 1794 (Qing) | 8,671 Manchu entries translated into Tibetan, Mongolian, Chagatai, and Chinese |
| Piya | 1125 (Song) | Erya supplement of plant and animal names |
| Qi Lin Bayin | 1650 (Qing) | Rime dictionary of Fuzhou dialect |
| Qieyun | 601 (Sui) | Rime dictionary of Classical Chinese, fanqie pronunciation glosses, 2,158 character entries |
| Qiyin lüe | 1161 (Song) | Rime dictionary resembling Yunjing |
| Shenglei | 230 (Cao Wei) | First Chinese rime dictionary, lost work, partially reconstructed |
| Shiben | 250 BC (Warring States) | First Chinese encyclopedic dictionary of origins |
| Shiming | 200 (Han) | Expansion of Erya, 1,502 entries, linguistically important Han-era pronunciation glosses |
| Shizhoupian | 800 BC (Zhou) | First recorded Chinese dictionary, Great Seal script, lost work |
| Shuowen Jiezi | 121 (Han) | First character dictionary collated by graphic radicals, 9,353 entries, see also List of 540 Shuowen Jiezi radicals |
| Tangyun | 732 (Tang) | Rime dictionary revision of Qieyun, lost work |
| The Five Thousand Dictionary | 1926 (ROC) | Courtenay Hughes Fenn's dictionary of 5,000 commonly used characters |
| Xiandai Hanyu Cidian | 1978–2012 (PRC) | Authoritative general-purpose dictionary, 6 editions, 69,000 entries |
| Xiao Erya | 150 BC (Han) | "Little Erya" supplement, 374 entries |
| Xinhua Zidian | 1957–2004 (PRC) | Best-selling Chinese dictionary, world's most popular reference work, 11 editions, 3,300 character entries, 189-radical system |
| Yiqiejing Yinyi (Huilin) | 807 (Tang) | Expansion of Yiqiejing yinyi (Xuanying), 31,000 word entries, 100 chapters |
| Yiqiejing Yinyi (Xuanying) | 649 (Tang) | Oldest surviving Chinese "pronunciation and meaning" dictionary of Buddhist technical terminology, 25 chapters, archetype for Chinese bilingual dictionaries |
| Yunhai jingyuan | 780 (Tang) | First rime dictionary collated phonetically instead of graphically, lost work |
| Yunjing | 1161, 1203 (Song) | Oldest extant rime tables, arranged by four tones of Middle Chinese and 23 types of articulation |
| Yupian | 543 (Liang) | Character dictionary with 12,158 character entries, 542-radical system, fanqie glosses |
| Zhengzitong | 1627 (Ming) | Supplement to the Zihui character dictionary, 33,000 entries |
| Zhongguo Renming Dacidian | 1921 (ROC) | Leading biographical dictionary in China |
| Zhonghua Da Zidian | 1915 (ROC) | Updated expansion of Kangxi Dictionary, 48,000 entries |
| Zhonghua Zihai | 1994 (PRC) | Currently the largest character dictionary, 85,568 entries |
| Zhongwen Da Cidian | 1962–1968 | Chinese revised version of Japanese Dai Kan-Wa Jiten, 49,905 character entries |
| Zhongyuan Yinyun | 1324 (Yuan) | Rime table, 5,866 characters collated by 19 rime groups, important for historical Chinese phonology |
| Zihui | 1615 (Ming) | First character dictionary to use the 214-radical system adopted by many later works |
| Zilin | 350 (Jin) | Character dictionary with 12,824 entries, 540-radical system, lost work, partially reconstructed |
| Zitong | 1254 (Southern Song) | Dictionary of orthography, compares seal, clerical, and regular script characters |
| Ziyuan | 340 (Eastern Jin) | Character dictionary attributed to Ge Hong, lost work excepting fragments |

== See also ==
- List of English dictionaries
- List of French dictionaries
- List of Japanese dictionaries
- List of etymological dictionaries
