= Yiqiejing yinyi =

Yiqiejing yinyi (切經音義) may refer to:

- Yiqiejing yinyi (Xuanying), a (c. 649) 25-chapter dictionary compiled by the monk Xuanying 玄應
- Yiqiejing Yinyi (Huilin), a (c. 807) 100-chapter dictionary compiled by the monk Huilin 慧琳
