= Yiqiejing yinyi (Xuanying) =

Chinese dictionary of Buddhism (c. 649)

- Dunhuang manuscript (c. 8th century) Yiqiejing yinyi section for Mahāsāṃghika Śāriputraparipṛcchā (舍利弗問經)

Chinese name
- Traditional Chinese: 一切經音義
- Simplified Chinese: 一切经音义
- Literal meaning: Pronunciation and meaning in all the sutras
Transcriptions
Standard Mandarin
- Hanyu Pinyin: Yīqièjīng yīn-yì
- Wade–Giles: I-ch'ieh-ching yin-i
Yue: Cantonese
- Jyutping: Jat1-cai3-ging1 jam1-ji6
Southern Min
- Hokkien POJ: It-chhèkeng imgī
Middle Chinese
- Middle Chinese: ʔJittshetkeng ʔimngje

Korean name
- Hangul: 일체경음의
- Hanja: 一切經音義
Transcriptions
- McCune–Reischauer: Ilch'egyŏng ŭm'ŭi

Japanese name
- Kanji: 一切經音義
- Hiragana: いっさいきょうおんぎ
Transcriptions
- Revised Hepburn: Issaikyō ongi

The Yiqiejing yinyi (c. 649) is the oldest surviving Chinese dictionary of technical Buddhist terminology, and the archetype for later Chinese bilingual dictionaries. This specialized glossary was compiled by the Tang dynasty lexicographer and monk Xuanying (玄應), who was a translator for the famous pilgrim and Sanskritist monk Xuanzang. When Xuanying died he had only finished 25 chapters of the dictionary, but in 807 another Tang monk named Huilin (慧琳) compiled an enlarged 100-chapter version bearing the same title.

== Title ==
Xuanying's dictionary title combines three Chinese words:

- yīqiè 一切 "all; whole; every; everything" for Sanskrit sárva सर्व "whole; entire; all; every"
- jīng 經 "sutra; scripture; canon; classic" for sūtra सूत्र " string; thread; rule (that holds teachings together)"
- yīn-yì 音義 "pronunciation and meaning of a text", with yīn 音 "sound; tone; pronunciation" and yì 義 "meaning; significance", for śabdârtha "sound and meaning (of words)"

The term yīqièjīng 一切經 "all the sutras; complete Buddhist canon; Tripiṭaka" first came into use in the Sui dynasty (581-618), also known as the Dàzàngjīng 大藏經, referring to all the classic scriptures or the entire Buddhist canon. The term yīnyì 音義 "pronunciation and meaning", which refers to explaining the phonology and semantics of words, originated in the exegesis of Chinese classics. The Three Kingdoms (220-280) scholar Sun Yan 孫炎 used it in his commentary title Erya yinyi 爾雅音義 "Pronunciation and Meaning in the Erya".

There is no regular English translation of Yiqiejing yinyi, compare these renderings:

- Sounds and Meanings of all the Buddhist Sacred Books or Sounds and Meanings of the Whole Canon
- The Sound and Meaning of the Tripitaka
- Pronunciation and Meaning of all Classics
- Sounds and Meanings of all the Buddhist Scriptures
- Glosses of the Buddhist Texts
- Sound and Meaning of All Sutras
- A Lexicon of Sounds and Meanings in the Tripitaka
- The Sound and the Meaning of All Scriptures
- Pronunciation and Meaning of All the Scriptures
- Sounds and meanings for all [the words in the] scriptures

Alternate Yiqiejing yinyi titles include the [Da Tang] Zhongjing yinyi [大唐]眾經音義 "[Great Tang] Pronunciation and Meaning in Every Sutra", and to distinguish it from Hulin's version, the Xuanying yinyi 玄應音義 "Xuanying's Pronunciation and Meaning".

A Daoist text adapted the Yiqiejing yinyi title. In 712, Emperor Xuanzong of Tang ordered a team of scholars to compile the catalog Yiqie Daojing yinyi 一切道經音義 "Titles and Meanings of all the Daoist Canon".

== Author ==
The lexicographer monk Xuanying 玄應 (a Dharma name meaning "Profound Resonance", fl. c. 645–656), who compiled the Yiqiejing yinyi, was one of the ten Buddhist monks on Xuanzang's translation committee. A postscript to Daoxuan's Xù gāosēng zhuàn 續高僧傳 "Continued Biographies of Eminent Monks" describes Xuanying as "a monk in a temple in the capital. He has won wide respect for his accomplishments in philological studies. He is a master of the study of the phonetic system of Buddhist scriptures". Both Xuanzang and Xuanying were monks at the Da Ci'en Monastery 大慈恩寺 (see Giant Wild Goose Pagoda) in Chang'an.

The (664) Dà Táng nèidiǎn lù 大唐内典錄 "Records of Internal Classics in the Tang Dynasty" describes his interaction with Emperor Taizong of Tang,

Xuan Ying, a Master in the Temple of Da Ci'en Temple, was summoned several times by the Emperor to collect and sort Buddhist scriptures and phonetically notate and semantically interpret characters from them. He cited quotations from various classic works to support his interpretations. The book can help its users to readily understand the scriptures. It is a pity that his works stopped at that, without going further.

== History ==
Kamakura period (c. 14th century) portrait of Xuanzang's pilgrimage, Tokyo National Museum

Buddhism was first transmitted to China via the Silk Road during the Eastern Han dynasty (25-220 CE). Buddhist missionary monks from Central Asia, such as Kumārajīva (344-413), produced early Chinese translations of Buddhist sutras and texts.

Translators had difficulties rendering Buddhist terminology from Sanskrit, Pali, and Middle Indo-Aryan languages into written Chinese. Because of the polysemous and sacred character of such Buddhist doctrinal concepts as bodhi and prajñā, many Chinese translators preferred to transliterate rather than translate such crucial terms, so as not to limit their semantic range to a single Chinese meaning. Furthermore, the spiritual efficacy thought to be inherent in the pronunciations of Buddhist mantra spells and dhāraṇī codes compelled translators to preserve as closely as possible the original foreign-language pronunciation.

The wide variety of methods, source texts, and exegetical strategies used by different Chinese translators of Buddhist texts in the Southern and Northern dynasties period (420-589) gave rise to a large number of neologisms and repurposed Chinese terms. For instance, the Standard Chinese translation of nirvana is nièpán ← Middle Chinese ngetban 涅槃, but earlier transcriptions include nièpánnà ← ngetbannop 涅槃那, and níwán ← nejhwan 泥丸 ("muddy pellet", a term from Daoist internal alchemy). The Chinese language adopted many new words from Buddhism, such as yīnguǒ 因果 "cause and effect; karma" and Fútú 浮屠 "Buddha", and these were entered into both special dictionaries of Buddhism and general dictionaries.

With more and more Indian and Central Asian texts being translated into Chinese, the use of Sanskrit and Middle Indo-Aryan transcriptions and technical vocabulary increased, and became progressively more difficult to comprehend. Meanwhile, errors occurred in the copying and circulation of the scriptures, which the scholar of Buddhism Liu Yu 柳豫 describes:

The Buddhist scriptures are voluminous and the argumentations in them are profound. They are afflicted with errors and misspellings, and their phonetic notations and semantic interpretations are often rough and neglectful. Days and months are spent in studying and sorting them. There is some progress, but concerns are inevitable. Reflections on them often come to nothing. All the scholars of good will would be troubled by them.

By the 6th century, the glut of different Chinese character transcriptions used for the same Buddhist terms led to attempts to standardize the Chinese transcriptions of them, and to clarify the obscure characters and compounds used to translatie Buddhist texts. This material was compiled in so-called yinyi 音義 "pronunciation and meaning" lexicons, specialized dictionaries that give phonetic and semantic information.

A predecessor to yinyi lexicons was the Northern Qi (550-577) Buddhist monk Daohui's 道慧 Yiqiejing yin 一切經音 "Pronunciation in the Complete Buddhist Canon", which did not gloss meanings. While a few yinyi glossaries are for one specific scripture, such as the Miàofǎ liánhuá jīng yīnyì 妙法蓮華經音義 "Pronunciation and Meaning in the Lotus Sutra by Kuiji (632-682), more glossaries like the Yiqiejing yinyi are for the entire Buddhist canon. One was the (c. 940) Xinji zangjing yinyi suihanlu 新集蔵経音義随函録 "Newly Compiled Record of Pronunciation and Meaning in the Buddhist Canon and Accompanying Materials" compiled by the Later Jin dynasty monk Ke Hong 可洪. Another example was the (987) Xu yiqiejing yinyi 續一切経音義 "Extended Pronunciation and Meaning in the Complete Buddhist Canon" by the Liao dynasty monk Xilin 希麟. This 10-chapter work, which followed Xuanying's dictionary format and style, had entries taken from 226 volumes of Buddhist scriptures. Each entry gave the phonetic notation, definition, and citations from dictionaries, rime dictionaries, histories, and other classic literature. In addition to their value in establishing the Chinese interpretation of Buddhist technical terms, these "pronunciation and meaning" glossaries also serve as important sources for studying the Chinese phonology of their times.

Besides the yinyi phonological and semantic glossaries of Chinese Buddhist terms, there were also collections of translated terms in the sutras, such as the Fānyì míngyì jí 翻譯名義集 "Collection of Translated Buddhist Terms" by Fayun 法雲 and Fān fànyǔ 翻梵語 "Translating Sanskrit" by Bao Chang 寶唱. In a strict sense, neither the glossaries nor the collections can be considered Sanskrit-Chinese bilingual dictionaries.

A significant breakthrough in the quality of translations occurred during the Tang dynasty (618-907) after Chinese Buddhist monks such as Xuanzang (596-664) and Yijing (635-713) made pilgrimages to India to study Buddhism and the Buddhist languages. Yijing allegedly compiled what might be the first Sanskrit-Chinese glossary, the Fanyu qianzi wen 梵語千字文 "Sanskrit 1000-Character Text". The body of this work is a 1000-character text composed of rhymed 4-character verses, and the glossary has 995 entries, each of which gives a transliterated Sanskrit headword, its Chinese phonetic equivalent, and then a single Chinese explanatory word. The characters used in the text form are limited to the defining vocabulary of the glossary, similar to the modern lexicographical method of the (1978) Longman Dictionary of Contemporary English.

The most renowned of all translator monks was Xuanzang, who started on a pilgrimage to India in 629 and returned to the Tang capital Chang'an in 645 with foreign missionaries and sacred Buddhist texts. Under Emperor Taizong's patronage, Xuanzang organized many learned monks, including Xuanying, and oversaw a translation bureau that resulted in 75 important Buddhist texts being made available to Chinese Buddhists.

Xuanying compiled his 25-chapter dictionary during the late Zhenguan era (626-649). According to Daoxuan (596-667), Xuanying was dissatisfied with Daohui's Yiqiejing yin so he compiled his own. He assembled 454 sutras from Mahayana, Śrāvakayāna, Vinaya, and Shastra traditions, collected and explained their difficult Chinese characters, probably as a primer for members of Xuanzang's translation team. Xuanying arranged the texts in a series starting with the Avatamsaka Sutra (Chinese Huáyánjīng 華嚴經) and ending with the Abhidharma Nyayanusara Sutra (Shùnzhèng lǐlùn 順正理論).

Xuanying's scholarship utilized the unprecedented advances in philological studies that resulted from the Chinese interest in reading and translating Sanskrit. Two notable examples are the compilation of rime dictionaries arranged on the basis of syllabic rime, and the fanqie (lit. "cut and turn") method of indicating a character's pronunciation by using two other characters, the first having the same consonant as the given character and the second having the same vowel and rime.

Huilin expanded Xuanying's 25-chapter lexicon and incorporated material from other authors, compiling it into his 100-chapter Huilin yinyi dictionary.

The Yiqiejing yinyi was transmitted in several different versions, and two are included in the standard Buddhist Canon Taishō Tripiṭaka (T 54, no. 2128 A and B). Although the Yiqiejing yinyi was primarily compiled for the purpose of reading and studying Buddhist scriptures, it is also valuable for Chinese linguistic and other historical academic studies.

== Content ==
The Yiqiejing yinyi text comprises 25 chapters/volumes (juǎn 卷) in 450 sections/parts (bù 部). Xuanying's purpose in compiling it was to explain the "hard words" found in Chinese translations of 454 Buddhist sutras. He glossed the pronunciations of both Sanskrit-derived technical terms and ordinary Chinese characters, and explained their meanings. The glosses on ordinary characters occupy about half of the book.

The British diplomat and scholar Thomas Watters (1840-1901) was first to describe Xuanying's dictionary in English.

The work is a glossary to the foreign, technical, and difficult words and phrases in the Buddhist canon. It gives the sounds and meanings of the Sanskrit proper names and terms of religion, and the different transcriptions which had been used. Important Chinese phrases are also explained and the pronunciation of characters given and illustrated.

Categorizing the groundbreaking Yiqiejing yinyi is difficult, and the lexicographers Heming Yong and Jing Peng classify it as a defining dictionary, special-purpose dictionary, general dictionary for interpretations of Buddhist scriptures, and sound-meaning book (yinyi shu 音義書).

For the format and style of the Yiqiejing yinyi, Xuanying followed the example of Lu Deming's (583) Jingdian Shiwen exegetical dictionary of the Confucian Thirteen Classics. The Yiqiejing yinyi preface quoted Lu regarding phonetic notation and definition. Lu Deming said a dictionary entry should give the pronunciation of a character first so as to "help the user to compare usage", "should add phonetic notation, define the character, trace its origin, and analyse and explain the difficult points or confusions", and should take citations from both ancient and contemporary literature, making them "plain but not crude, abundant but not chaotic".

The basic structure of each Yiqiejing yinyi definition is to give: any variant renderings of the headword, the pronunciation of rare or difficult characters, Chinese translation and comments, and, optionally, the corrected transcription of the Sanskrit. The entry for jiǎokuài < Middle Chinese kæwX-kwajH 狡獪 "crafty; joke; play" exemplifies Xuanying's detailed glosses.

狡獪 jiǎo[kuài] < kæwX-kwajH (~ kwæjH): The Tōngsúwén 通俗文 says: small children playing is called 狡獪 kæwX-kwajH [or kæwX-kwæjH]. Nowadays, within the pass [guānzhōng 關中, i.e. in the central plain of Shānxī] it is pronounced 狡刮 kæwX-kwæt; this is an error.

Fu Qian's 服虔 (late 2nd century) Tongsuwen 通俗文 "Popular Words" was the first Chinese dictionary of common words. The Guanzhong region is in the lower valley of the Wei River.

Pronunciation glosses are indicated with fanqie, using Xuanzang's phonologically sophisticated fanqie transcription system. While Xuanying does not mention the (601) Qieyun rime dictionary, which uses different fanqie character "spellings" from the Yiqiejing yinyi, the similarity between the phonological systems of the two works indicates that they were based on the same Chinese dialect.

Xuanying's Yiqiejing yinyi made more detailed and specific semantic explanations than earlier dictionaries, "no judgements would be given before rigorous textual research had been carried out and meticulous comments added". For elucidating word meanings, Xuanying quotes from more than 112 works in Chinese literature. They include Confucian Classics and their commentaries, as well as early dictionaries like the Cangjiepian, Shuowen Jiezi, Ziyuan, Zilin, and Shenglei. Since many quotes come from lost works, Qing dynasty (1644-1911) scholars used the Yiqiejing yinyi to partially reconstruct them.

For the collation of Yiqiejing yinyi entries, Xuanying followed Lu Deming's Jingdian shiwen arrangement by provenance in individual scripture. At the beginning of each chapter is a listing of the sutras from which the headwords are selected, and the headwords are presented and numbered following the sequence of the sutra chapters. In order to find a word, a user cannot search by either character or pronunciation (as in most Chinese dictionaries), but must first find the scripture in which the word occurs. This method of collation by the order in which headwords appeared in the sutra text is comparable to the (c. 800) Leiden Glossary.

The Yiqiejing yinyi is not strictly a bilingual dictionary in the modern meaning of containing headwords in Sanskrit or other Buddhist-language scripts and Chinese translation equivalents. It is essentially a monolingual dictionary of Chinese Buddhist terms because all the headwords are Chinese character transcriptions of Sanskrit loanwords and the definitions are in Chinese characters. According to Yong and Peng, early yinyi glossaries and dictionaries bear some basic features of modern bilingual dictionaries, but it is more reasonable to consider them as the "most distant forerunners of modern Chinese bilingual dictionaries". In any case, the Yiqiejing yinyi, which compiled non-Chinese loanwords and defined them in Chinese, is the "first Buddhist dictionary of its kind and the first, albeit crude, attempt at bilingual lexicography". Furthermore, it preceded Horace Hayman Wilson's (1819) Sanskrit-English Dictionary by more than one thousand years.

There are flaws in the Yiqiejing yinyi. Most notably, it has an especially user-unfriendly lookup for words arranged according their occurrence in sutras. Watters said, "Though native scholars quote this treatise freely it is not easy to consult, owing to the absence of an index and the want of a good arrangement." There are also cryptic or incomplete definitions, unnecessary repetitions, and imbalanced treatment of different characters in notation and interpretation.

Despite its defects, scholars highly regard Xuanying's Yiqiejing yinyi. It is not only of interest for early Buddhist terminology, but also for the study of historical Chinese phonology and early written vernacular Chinese, which had a great influence on Buddhist writings (see bianwen). Yong and Peng describe the Yiqiejing yinyi as "extremely useful for studying Buddhist scriptures", "valuable to exegetic studies of ancient characters", and treasured for having retained what had been lost in other sources. Xing Guang calls it a "valuable work for modern scholars" owing to the high quality of Xuanying's editing and scholarship.
