= Shenglei =

First Chinese rime dictionary (c. 230 CE)

Chinese name
- Traditional Chinese: 聲類
- Simplified Chinese: 声类
- Literal meaning: sound categories
Transcriptions
Standard Mandarin
- Hanyu Pinyin: Shēnglèi
- Wade–Giles: Sheng-lei
Yue: Cantonese
- Jyutping: Seng1 leoi6
Southern Min
- Hokkien POJ: Siaⁿlui
Middle Chinese
- Middle Chinese: Syenglwij
Old Chinese
- Baxter–Sagart (2014): [l̥]eŋ[r]u[t]-s

Korean name
- Hangul: 聲類
- Hanja: 성류
Transcriptions
- McCune–Reischauer: Sŏngryu

Japanese name
- Kanji: 声類
- Hiragana: せいるい
Transcriptions
- Revised Hepburn: Seirui

The Shenglei was the first Chinese rime dictionary, compiled c. 230 CE by Li Deng (李登), a lexicographer from the state of Cao Wei (220–266). Earlier dictionaries were organized either by semantic fields (e.g. the c. 3rd-century BCE Erya) or by character radicals (e.g., the Shuowen Jiezi published in 121 CE). The last copies of the Shenglei were lost around the 13th century, and it is known only from earlier descriptions and quotations, which say it was in ten volumes and listed 11520 Chinese characters, with entries categorized by linguistic tone in terms of the 'five tones' (五聲; wǔshēng) of the pentatonic scale from Chinese musicology and wuxing ('five phases') theory.

== Title ==
The title combines shēng 聲 "sound; voice; declare; reputation; tone (in Chinese linguistics); initial consonant (of a Chinese syllable)" and lèi 類 "kind; type; class; category; genus; form class (in Chinese linguistics)".

English translations of the title include: Sounds Classified, Sound Categories, Classification of Sounds, Categories of Pronunciation, and Dictionary of Initial Consonants. This last translation interprets sheng 聲 in the 4th-century Shenglei to mean the contemporary linguistic term shēngmǔ 聲母 "initial consonant (of a Chinese syllable)"; exemplifying Yong and Peng's practice of assigning a "startlingly anachronistic English title" to some Chinese dictionaries, such as The Ready Guide for the venerable Erya.

== History ==
Chinese texts from circa the 6th century to the 13th century referred to the Shenglei, after which it was lost. In the 19th century, Chinese scholars collected hundreds of Shenglei fragments and quotations, enabling better understanding of the text.

Many works mentioned the Shenglei together with the second oldest rime dictionary, the (c. 280) Yunji 韻集 "Assembly of Rhymes", by Lü Jing 呂靜 of the Western Jin Dynasty. Neither of these works has survived, but judging by later rime dictionaries, they were clearly stimulated by the fanqie method of indicating character pronunciation. Both borrowed Chinese music terms in order to lexicographically collate words by pronunciation: the contrasting terms qīng 清 "clear; high pitch" and zhuó 濁 "muddy; low pitch", and the wǔshēng 五聲 "five musical tones (of the pentatonic scale)": gōng 宮, shāng 商, jué 角, zhǐ 徵 and yǔ 羽—equivalent to do, re, mi, sol, and la in western solfège.

=== Northern and Southern dynasties ===
The first references to the Shenglei and Yunji are from the Northern and Southern dynasties period (420–589). In the period of the Wei to the Northern and Southern dynasties, "lexicography in China entered the stage of exploration and development. There were more new dictionary types coming into being and discoveries were waiting to be made in format and style, in mode of definition, and in phonetic notation."

The (514) Lunshu biao 論書表 "Memorial on Calligraphy", by Jiang Shi 江式, was included by his biography in the (554) Book of Wei history of the Northern Wei (386–535) dynasty. It said, "Lü Jing, the brother of Lü Chen, took examples from [the Shenglei] by Li Deng and compiled [the Yunji] (five volumes). Each tone makes up a volume.".

Yan Zhitui's (581) Yanshi jiaxun 顏氏家訓 "Family Instructions of the Yan Clan" describes the origins of fanqie pronunciation notation and rime dictionaries with Sun Yan 孫炎's Erya Yinyi 爾雅音義 "Sounds and Meanings of the Erya": "Sun Shuyan writing Sounds and Meanings of the Ready Guide (爾雅音義) illustrates the first knowledge of fanqie. Fanqie became very popular in the Wei Dynasty … since then, rhyme books have begun to come out". The Qing dynasty scholar Chen Li (1810–1882) said this passage referred to the Shenglei.

As to 'since then, rhyme books have begun to come out'; Sun Shuyan was referring to Li Deng's compilation of The Dictionary of Initial Consonants, which was the first rhyme book in the history of Chinese lexicography. When the method of fanqie was invented, it was possible to group together characters with the same rhymes, and consequently, rhyme books came into being.

=== Sui dynasty ===
The (636) Book of Sui, the official Sui dynasty (581–618) history, first directly referred to the Shenglei and Yunji in two chapters. The "Biography of Pan Hui" 潘徽 compares these two 3rd-century rime dictionaries with four earlier character dictionaries, the Sancang 三蒼, Jijiupian, Shuowen Jiezi 說文解字, and Zilin 字林.

Previous works like Three Cang Primer [三蒼] and The Instant Primer [急就] have merely retained some texts and quotations; those like An Explanatory Dictionary of Chinese Characters [說文] and The Character Forest [字林] only focus on differentiating the form and structure of characters. As for the study of speech sounds and rhymes, there is much doubt and confusion. Either through speculation on ancient characters or interpretation of contemporary ones, the investigations have mostly missed the target. It is in The Dictionary of Initial Consonants [聲類] and The Collection of Rhymes [韻集] that the voiceless is differentiated from the voiced and the tones are demarcated in five scales [始判清濁才分宮羽]. (76)

In a more literal translation, "this book was the first to make distinctions between qing 清 and zhuo 濁, and divide gong 宮 and yu 羽 tones."

The Book of Sui "Bibliography" section (Yiwenzhi) said the Shenglei had ten volumes, and added scarce biographical information that Li Deng held the post of Zuoxianling 左校令 "Left Superintendent" (in the Board of Labor) in the last years of the Wei dynasty. Nothing further is known about him.

=== Tang dynasty ===
The Shenglei was in wide circulation during the Tang dynasty (618–907), as evidenced by the two Buddhist dictionaries titled Yiqiejing Yinyi 一切經音義 "Pronunciation and Meaning in the Tripiṭaka". The 25-volume version by the monk Xuanying 玄應 (c. 649–661) cited the Shenglei 207 times, once indicated by author and title, the rest by title alone; the 100-volume version by the monk Huilin 慧琳 (737–820) quoted the rime dictionary 625 times, some only by title, others by author and title.

The (c. 770) Fengshi wenjianji 封氏聞見記 "Master Feng's Record of Knowledge", written by the scholar Feng Yan 封演, was the first work to record the number of Shenglei dictionary volumes and characters. The Wenzi 文字 "Characters" section mentions it in a list of early Chinese dictionaries, "In the Wei dynasty there is a scholar called Li Deng, who compiled The Dictionary of Initial Consonants. It has ten volumes and contains 11,520 characters. It is arranged according to the five tones without further division into sections [以五聲命字不立諸部]." Translating the last sentence as, "the entries in the book were arranged according to five sound classes, but that rime groups were not yet to be established", Tsai notes, "A rime book not organized into rime groups is hardly a legitimate dictionary for riming purposes."

The (945) Old Book of Tang Bibliography lists Li Deng's Shenglei in ten volumes.

=== Song dynasty ===
Texts from the Song dynasty (960–1279) recorded the last existing copies of the Shenglei.

Both the (1161) Tongzhi encyclopedia by historian Zheng Qiao 鄭樵 and the (c. 1290) Yuhai 玉海 "Jade Ocean" by Wang Yinglin 王應麟 repeat the Book of Sui bibliographic information that the Shenglei had ten volumes and Li Deng served as "Left Superintendent".

The Shenglei was not recorded in the (1346) History of Song "Bibliography" or in any major private catalogues, indicating that the text was likely lost after the late Song era.

=== Qing dynasty ===
During the Qing dynasty (1644–1912) there was a resurgence of scholarship in the Chinese classics, and several researchers collected fragments of Shenglei glosses from the classics and encyclopedias. Huang Shi 黃奭 (c. 1826) collected 252 citations, and Ma Guohan 馬國翰 collected 73 Shenglei glosses.

== Interpretations ==
Early sources generally agree that the (c. 250) Shenglei rime dictionary contained 11,520 main characters organized by means of the qing 清 "clear" and zhuo 濁 "muddy" contrast pair, and the wusheng 五聲 "the Five Tones (do-re-mi-sol-la) of the pentatonic scale (gōng-shāng-jué-zhǐ-yǔ 宮, 商, 角, 徵, 羽)".

The terms qīng and zhuó had various applications in later phonological writings. In the Song dynasty rime tables, they referred to voiceless and voiced initial consonants respectively, but their Shenglei phonetic interpretation is obscure. The earliest recorded usage of qīngzhuó 清濁 meaning "voiceless and voiced" was in the (581) Yanshi jiaxun 顏氏家訓.

The pentatonic wusheng "Five Notes" were the Chinese musicology correlation of the wǔxíng 五行 "Five Phases; Five Elements" theory about mù 木 "Wood", huǒ 火 "Fire", tǔ 土 "Earth", jīn 金 "Metal"), and shuǐ 水 "Water". The Five Phases/Elements cosmological system has numerous corresponding sets of five. Many sets seem plausible, such as the wǔsè 五色 "Five Colors (blue/green, yellow, red, white, black)"—corresponding to Berlin and Kay's basic color terms hypothesis. Some less plausible Five Phases sets are correlated with naturally occurring sets of four, such as the four tones in Chinese. For instance, the cardinal directions and seasons are stretched into the wǔfāng 五方 "Five Directions (north, south, east, west, and center)" and wǔshí 五時 "Five Seasons (spring, summer, autumn, winter, and the 6th month [considered an intercalcary month between summer and autumn])".

The Bunkyō hifuron 文鏡祕府論, by the Japanese monk Kūkai (774–835), quotes Yuan Jing 元兢 (fl. 668), author of the Shisuinao 詩髓腦 "The Bone-marrow and Brains of Poetry", as saying that the Shenglei Five Tones correspond to the sìshēng 四聲 four tones of later rime dictionaries: píng 平 "even/level", shǎng 上 "rising", 去 qù "departing/going", rù 入 "entering/checked". "There are five sounds in music: jiao, zi, gong, shang, and yu. They are so distributed as to represent the four tones of characters, level (ping), rising (shang), departing (qu), and entering (ru). Gong and shang are the level tones. Zi is the rising tone. Yu is the departing tone. And jiao is the entering tone." The following table demonstrates the relationship between the Five Tones and the four tonal categories in the Shenglei according to this account.

Terms	Gong 宮	Shang 商	Jue 角	Zhi 徵	Yu 羽
Musical tones	Do	Re	Mi	So	La
Phonological tones	平 Level		上 Rising	去 Departing	入 Entering

However, the four tones were first explicitly identified around the start of the 6th century, by Shen Yue and Zhou Yong 周顒. Joseph Needham finds it "unlikely" that the circa-250 Shenglei used sheng to mean "linguistic tone", as in shēngdiào 聲調 "tone; note; key; melody".

Assuming that the 10-volume Shenglei (possibly with 2 volumes for each tone) and 5-volume Yunji were consistent in format and style, Yong and Peng suggest that the Shenglei must have already been classifying rime sections that were mutually differentiated under each tone. The stylistic features of later rime dictionaries organized according to rime sections based on the four-tone system, with fanqie phonetic notations, and definitions, "were basically present" in the Shenglei and Yunji. The Shenglei started a new era of compiling special rime dictionaries and established the format and style for rime dictionaries and other dictionaries to come.
