= Zilin =

Chinese Jin dynasty dictionary

Chinese name
- Chinese: 字林
- Literal meaning: character forest
Transcriptions
Standard Mandarin
- Hanyu Pinyin: Zìlín
- Wade–Giles: Tzu-lin
Yue: Cantonese
- Jyutping: Zi^{4}lam^{4}
Southern Min
- Hokkien POJ: Jīlîm
Middle Chinese
- Middle Chinese: DziH lim
Old Chinese
- Baxter–Sagart (2014): Mə-dzə(ʔ)-s[r]əm

Korean name
- Hangul: 字林
- Hanja: 자림
Transcriptions
- McCune–Reischauer: Charim

Japanese name
- Kanji: 字林
- Hiragana: じりん
Transcriptions
- Revised Hepburn: Jirin

The Zilin (Chinese: 字林; c. 350) or Forest of Characters was a Chinese dictionary compiled by the Jin dynasty (266–420) lexicographer Lü Chen (呂忱). It contained 12,824 character head entries, organized by the 540-radical system of the Shuowen Jiezi. In the history of Chinese lexicography, the Zilin followed the Shuowen Jiezi (121; with 9,353 character entries) and preceded the Yupian (c. 543; with 12,158 entries).

== Text ==
Lü Chen compiled the Zilin to supplement the Shuowen jiezi, and included more the 3,000 uncommon and variant Chinese characters. Yong and Peng describe the Zilin as a "more influential character dictionary" than the Shuowen jiezi.

Lü Chen's younger brother Lü Jing (呂靜) was also a lexicographer, who compiled the Yunji (韻集; "Assembly of Rimes"; c. 280). Other than their dictionaries, little is known about either brother.

The title Zilin, translated as "Forest of Characters" or "The Character Forest", combines zì 字 "character; script; writing; graph" and lín 林 "forest; woods; grove; group; collection of literary works; many; numerous". Titles of several Japanese dictionaries adapted this rin 林 "forest" metaphor, such as Daijirin (大辞林; "Great Forest of Words", 1988) and Dai Kangorin (大漢語林; "Great Forest of Chinese"; 1992).

== History ==
The Zilin was popular in the Northern and Southern dynasties period (420–589), when "lexicography in China entered the stage of exploration and development. There were more new dictionary types coming into being and discoveries were waiting to be made in format and style, in mode of definition, and in phonetic notation.".

During the Liu Song dynasty (420–479), Wu Gongceng (吳恭曾) from Yang Province compiled the first commentary to the Zilin, the Zilin yinyi (字林音義; "Pronunciations and Meanings in the Zilin") in 5 volumes.

Jiang Shi (江式) was a renowned calligrapher and epigraphist during the Northern Wei (386–535) dynasty. His biography in the Book of Wei (554) history included the Lunshu biao (論書表; "Memorial on Calligraphy"; 514), in which Jiang Shi described the Zilin. When Prince of Yiyang (r. 349–350) was enfeoffed at Rencheng (任城) commandery (present-day Yanzhou District), Lü Chen presented the Zilin in 6 volumes.

It generally follows the example of the [Shuowen jiezi]. It cites extensively and identifies and differentiates ancient characters, characters of the zhou style, odd characters, and characters easily confusable. Its writing style is the standardized official script of the Han dynasty. It has, to a large extent, captured the essence of xiaozhuan.

Zhòuwén (籀文; "Large Seal Script") and xiǎozhuàn (小篆; "Small Seal Script") were archaic forms of Chinese calligraphy. Thus, the Zilin followed the Shuowen jiezi format of giving the head character entry in Small Seal Script and the definition in clerical script.

The Northern Qi dynasty (550–577) scholar Yan Zhitui's (581) Yanshi jiaxun (顏氏家訓; "Family Instructions of the Yan Clan") referred to the usefulness of consulting the Zilin. After accompanying the Emperor on a tour, Yan Zhitui wanted to look up the origins and archaic pronunciations of two obscure place names, but could not find the answers in any books, until he checked the Zilin and Yunji character dictionaries. Yan Zhitui also referred to Lü Chen (without the Zilin title) in stressing the importance of character dictionaries. "Words and characters are fundamental. For students nowadays, they rarely have a better knowledge of characters: when they read the Five Classics" they follow the civil official Xu Miao rather than the lexicographer Xu Shen, "and when they practice writing fu-poems," they believed in the Chuci poet Qu Yuan's interpretations but neglected Lü Chen's.

The Book of Sui (636), the official Sui dynasty (581–618) history, "Biography of Pan Hui" (潘徽) criticized the Cangjiepian and Jijiupian character primers and Shuowen jiezi and Zilin character dictionaries and praised the Shenglei and Yunji rime dictionaries.

Previous works like Three Cang Primer [三蒼] and The Instant Primer [急就] have merely retained some texts and quotations; those like An Explanatory Dictionary of Chinese Characters [說文] and The Character Forest [字林] only focus on differentiating the form and structure of characters. As for the study of speech sounds and rhymes, there is much doubt and confusion. Either through speculation on ancient characters or interpretation of contemporary ones, the investigations have mostly missed the target. It is in The Dictionary of Initial Consonants [聲類] and The Collection of Rhymes [韻集] that the voiceless is differentiated from the voiced and the tones are demarcated in five scales [始判清濁才分宮羽]. (76)

The Book of Sui "Bibliography" section includes Lü Chen's Zilin in 7 volumes and Wu Gongceng's Zilin yinyi (字林音義) in 5 volumes.

Up through the Tang dynasty (618–907), the Zilin "was considered as important as the Shuowen jiezi, but it was later lost. Yan Yuansun (顏元孫; d. 732), the Tang author of Ganlu Zishu "Lexicon for Seeking a Salary", used the Zilin as a source for determining the zheng 正 "correct" (suitable for government examinations) forms of characters.

The Fengshi wenjianji (封氏聞見記; "Master Feng's Record of Knowledge"; c. 770), written by the Tang dynasty scholar Feng Yan (封演), described the Zilin in a list of early Chinese dictionaries (2). During the Jin dynasty, Lü Chen sought out unusual characters and compiled the Zilin in 7 volumes, following the [Shuowen jiezi system of] 540 radicals, it included 12,824 characters. Among all the Shuowen jiezi-based dictionaries, Lü Chen's was the most beneficial.

The last remaining copies of the Zilin were lost before the Song dynasty (960–1279). The Book of Song (1493) only mentions this dictionary once. A discussion of different vehicle types (18, 禮五) quotes the Zilin that a píngchē (軿車; "curtained carriage") had cloth curtains but no rear yuán (轅; "(cart/carriage) shaft"), while a zīchē (輜車; "ancient covered wagon") had a rear shaft.

During the Qing dynasty (1644–1911), scholars collected surviving fragments of the Zilin and quotations in other books. For example, the Kangxi Dictionary (1716) quotes its definitions and pronunciations over 180 times. Ren Dazhuang (任大樁; 1738–1789) compiled the 8-volume Zilin kaoyi (字林考逸; "Examining the Lost Zilin") in, and Tao Fangqi (陶方琦; 1845–1884) compiled the Zilin kaoyi buben (字林考逸補本; "Supplement to Examining the Lost Zilin").
