= Shi You =

Shi You (Chinese: 史游; pinyin: Shǐ Yóu; Wade–Giles: Shih Yu, fl. 48–33 BC) was a Chinese calligrapher, eunuch, and writer of the Han dynasty, who served as Director of Eunuch Attendants (黃門令) under Emperor Yuan of Han.

He authored the dictionary Jijiupian in c. 40 BC and is believed to be the inventor of cursive script.
