= Yiqiejing yinyi (Huilin) =

- Dunhuang manuscript (c. 8th century) Yiqiejing yinyi section for Mahāsāṃghika Śāriputraparipṛcchā (舍利弗問經)

Chinese name
- Traditional Chinese: 一切經音義
- Simplified Chinese: 一切经音义
- Literal meaning: Pronunciation and Meaning in all the Sutras
Transcriptions
Standard Mandarin
- Hanyu Pinyin: Yīqièjīng yīn-yì
- Wade–Giles: I-ch'ieh-ching yin-i
Yue: Cantonese
- Jyutping: Jat^{1}cai^{3}ging^{1} jam^{1}ji^{6}
Southern Min
- Hokkien POJ: It-chhèkeng imgī
Middle Chinese
- Middle Chinese: ʔJittshetkeng ʔimngje

Korean name
- Hangul: 一切經音義
- Hanja: 일체경음의
Transcriptions
- McCune–Reischauer: Ilch'egyŏng ŭm'ŭi

Japanese name
- Kanji: 一切經音義
- Hiragana: いっさいきょうおんぎ
Transcriptions
- Revised Hepburn: Issaikyō ongi

The Yiqiejing yinyi (Chinese: 一切經音義; lit. 'Pronunciation and Meaning in the Complete Buddhist Canon') was a dictionary compiled (c. 807) by the Tang dynasty lexicographer monk Huilin (慧琳), as an expanded revision of the original Yiqiejing yinyi compiled (c. 649) by Xuanying (玄應). Collectively, Xuanying's 25-chapter and Huilin's 100-chapter versions constitute the oldest surviving Chinese dictionary of Buddhist technical terminology (for instance, Púsà 菩薩 or Pútísàtuo 菩提薩埵 for Bodhisattva). A recent history of Chinese lexicography call Huilin's Yiqiejing yinyi "a composite collection of all the glossaries of scripture words and expressions compiled in and before the Tang Dynasty" and "the archetype of the Chinese bilingual dictionary".

== Title ==
The dictionary title combines three Chinese words:

- yị̄qiè 一切 "all; whole; every; everything" for Sanskrit sarva सर्व "whole; entire; all; every"
- jīng 經 "sutra; scripture; canon; classic" for sūtra सूत्र " string; thread; rule (that holds teachings together)"
- yīn-yì 音義 "pronunciation and meaning of a text", with yīn 音 "sound; tone; pronunciation" and yì 義 "meaning; significance", for śabdârtha "sound and meaning (of words)"

The term yīqièjīng (一切經, "all the sutras; complete Buddhist canon; Tripiṭaka") first came into use in the Sui dynasty (581–618), also known as the Dàzàngjīng (大藏經), referring to all the classic scriptures or the entire Buddhist canon. The term yīnyì (音義, "pronunciation and meaning"), which refers to explaining the phonology and semantics of words, originated in the exegesis of Chinese classics. The Three Kingdoms (220–280) scholar Sun Yan (孫炎) used it in his commentary title Erya yinyi (爾雅音義, "Pronunciation and Meaning in the Erya").

There is no regular English translation of Yiqiejing yinyi, compare these renderings:

- Sounds and Meanings of all the Buddhist Sacred Books or Sounds and Meanings of the Whole Canon
- The Sound and Meaning of the Tripitaka
- Pronunciation and Meaning of all Classics
- Sounds and Meanings of all the Buddhist Scriptures
- Glosses of the Buddhist Texts
- Sound and Meaning of All Sutras
- A Lexicon of Sounds and Meanings in the Tripitaka
- The Sound and the Meaning of All Scriptures
- Pronunciation and Meaning of All the Scriptures
- Sounds and meanings for all [the words in the] scriptures

Alternate Yiqiejing yinyi titles include the Dazang yinyi (大藏音義, "Pronunciation and Meaning in the Tripiṭaka"), and to distinguish it from Xuanying's version, the Huilin yinyi (慧琳音義, "Huilin's Pronunciation and Meaning").

== Author ==
There is more biographical information available for the Kashgar monk Huilin (733–817) than his predecessor Xuanying (d. c. 661).

The Biographies of Eminent Song Dynasty Monks (宋高僧傳; Song gaoseng zhuan, 988) gives a detailed record. Huilin's surname was Pei (裴), and he was born in Shule (疏勒) Kashgar (a city-state in the Tarim Basin, present-day Kashi (喀什), Xinjiang, the westernmost city in China). Huilin was a disciple of Master Bukong (不空) or Amoghavajra (705–744), one of the Patriarchs of Chinese Esoteric Buddhism and Shingon Buddhism. He was a monk at the Ximing Temple in Chang'an (present-day Xi'an, Shanxi, at the eastern terminus of the Silk Road). Huilin "inwardly strictly observes the regulations and outwardly studies the Confucian Classics. He has a profound knowledge of Indian philology and exegetic studies"

The Chinese Dharma name Huilin (慧琳, lit. "Wisdom Gem") was first used by another Buddhist monk. Huilin (fl. 421–445), who was favored by Emperor Wen of Liu Song, wrote the controversial Discourse on White and Black (白黑論; Baihei lun, 443) that expressed doubts about karmic retribution.

== History ==
In the history of Chinese lexicography, Hulin's Yiqiejing yinyi was an early Buddhist yinyi "pronunciation and meaning" dictionary. This genre originated when Buddhism became a popular Chinese religion in the period between the Eastern Han dynasty (25-220 CE) and Tang dynasty (618–907). For example, the Northern Qi (550–577) Buddhist monk Daohui (道慧) compiled the Pronunciation in the Complete Buddhist Canon (一切經音; Yiqiejing yin), which did not gloss meanings.

Early translators, including both Central Asian Buddhist missionaries and Chinese monks, often had difficulties accurately rendering Buddhist terminology from Sanskrit, Pali, and Middle Indo-Aryan languages into written Chinese. The wide variety of methods, source texts, and exegetical strategies used by different translators of Buddhist texts in the Southern and Northern dynasties period (420–589) gave rise to a large number of neologisms and repurposed Chinese terms. For instance, Sanskrit nirvana is usually transcribed with the Chinese characters nièpán ← Middle Chinese ngetban 涅槃, but also had alternate phonetic transcriptions such as nièpánnà ← ngetbannop 涅槃那, and a similarly pronounced term from Daoist internal alchemy níwán ← nejhwan 泥丸 ("muddy pellet; one of the Nine Palaces in the head"). With more and more Indian and Central Asian texts being translated into Chinese, the use of Sanskrit and Middle Indo-Aryan transcriptions and technical vocabulary increased, and became progressively more difficult to comprehend. Meanwhile, errors occurred in the copying and circulation of the scriptures, which the scholar of Buddhism Liu Yu (柳豫) describes:

The Buddhist scriptures are voluminous and the argumentations in them are profound. They are afflicted with errors and misspellings, and their phonetic notations and semantic interpretations are often rough and neglectful. Days and months are spent in studying and sorting them. There is some progress, but concerns are inevitable. Reflections on them often come to nothing. All the scholars of good will would be troubled by them.

Xuanying's purpose in writing the original Yiqiejing yinyi was to standardize the diverse Chinese Buddhist technical terminology used in the Buddhist canon, gloss correct pronunciation, note variant transcriptions, and give semantic explanations.

Huilin started to compile the Yiqiejing yinyi in 788 and finished it in 810 (or, according to another account, started in 783 and finished in 807). The text has two prefaces by Tang scholars, one written by the monk Gu Qizhi (顧齊之) and one by the poet Jing Fan (景審). The preface says Huilin's wordbook "is as vast as the sea, embracing numerous streams and therefore profound, and is as bright as a mirror, reflecting tirelessly the objects in the world". In 851, during the reign of Emperor Xuānzong of Tang, Huilin's book was officially included into the Buddhist Canon.

Huilin's dictionary was supplemented by the Extended Pronunciation and Meaning in the Complete Buddhist Canon (續一切経音義; Xu yiqiejing yinyi, 987), compiled by the Liao dynasty monk Xilin (希麟). This 10-chapter dictionary had entries taken from 226 Buddhist scriptures. Each entry gave the phonetic notation, definition, and citations from dictionaries, rime dictionaries, histories, and other classic literature. In addition to their value in establishing the Chinese interpretation of Buddhist technical terms, these "pronunciation and meaning" glossaries also serve as important sources for studying the Chinese phonology of their times.

Copies of the Yiqiejing yinyi were later transmitted to Korea and Japan. In 1737, it was first printed in Japan, and those copies were reprinted by Qing dynasty scholars. The Japanese (1924–1934) Taishō Tripiṭaka edition of the Chinese Buddhist canon included the Yiqiejing yinyi (T 54, no. 2128).

== Content ==
Huilin spent over 20 years editing the Yiqiejing yinyi, and the resultant dictionary is huge. It comprises 100 chapters/volumes (juan 卷), with a total of about 600,000 characters. There are 31,000 headword entries for difficult terms excerpted from over 1,300 different Buddhist scriptures.

Huilin compiled his magnum opus as an expanded version of Xuanying's (c. 649) Yiqiejing yinyi. He incorporated all of Xuanying's definitions, with some corrections. For the collation of entries, Huilin copied Xuanying's arrangement by provenance in individual scripture, which in turn was copied from Lu Deming's (583) Jingdian Shiwen exegetical dictionary of the Confucian Thirteen Classics. At the beginning of each chapter, Huilin listed the sutras and chapters from which the headwords are selected. This user-unfriendly method of collating headwords is comparable to the (c. 800) Leiden Glossary.

Each Yiqiejing yinyi entry first gives any variant transcriptions of the headword, the fanqie pronunciation of rare or difficult characters, Chinese translation, and comments. The entry for wúfù ← Middle Chinese mjubjuwH 無復 "never again" (Sanskrit apunar "not again; only once"; Muller exemplifies Huilin's use of fanqie glosses for pronunciation.

無復 [wúfù < mju-bjuwH]: The second character in the Wú 吳 pronunciation is 扶救切 [b(ju) + (k)juwH = bjuwH]; in the Qín 秦 pronunciation it is 切 [b(juwng) + (m)juwk = bjuwk].

The Tang period states of Wu and Qin correspond to present day Jiangsu-Zhejiang and Shaanxi.

Huilin's preface says the pronunciation glosses were based on "Qinyun" (秦韻, "Qin pronunciation"), that is, the koiné language spoken in the capital Chang'an. Pronunciations in the (c. 807) Yiqiejing yinyi document diachronic simplification in Chinese phonology, and more closely correlate with the 106 rimes of the (c. 780) Yunhai jingyuan rime dictionary than the 193 of the (601) Qieyun.

In order to explain the pronunciations and meanings of difficult words used in Buddhist scriptures, Huilin cited from over 750 lexicographical and commentarial works, including rime dictionaries, Chinese character dictionaries, yinyi commentaries to Buddhist scriptures, and commentaries to the Chinese classics. Many of these are now lost, but have been partly reconstructed on the basis of Huilin's "ample and carefully attributed" quotations.

First, Huilin cited early rime dictionaries, such as the Yunquan (韻詮, "Rime Interpretation"), Yunying (韻英, "Rime Essentials"), and Kaosheng qieyun (考聲切韻, "Examining Pronunciation in the Qieyun"). These three exemplify the numerous lost works that were primarily reassembled from Yiqiejing yinyi citations.

Second, the Yiqiejing yinyi quotes linguistic information from Chinese dictionaries and glossaries. Some are familiar lexicons like the Shuowen Jiezi, Yupian, and Zilin; others are little known like the Zitong (字統, "All Characters"), Gujin zhengzi (古今正字, "The Rectification of Ancient and Contemporary Characters"), and Kaiyuan yinyi (開元音義, "Pronunciations and Meanings of Kaiyuan [era 713-741] Characters").

Third, Huilin cited from phonetic-semantic commentaries for Buddhist sutras, such as Huiyuan's Huayanjing shu (華嚴經疏, "Commentary to the Garland Sutra"), and Kuiji's Miàofǎ liánhuá jīng yīnyì (妙法蓮華經音義, "Pronunciation and Meaning in the Lotus Sutra"). Hulin's dictionary was the first to comment on many Buddhist works.

Fourth, when Buddhist terminology was not included previous dictionaries or commentaries, Huilin quoted commentaries for the Chinese classics, both Confucian and Daoist. For instance, Zheng Zhong's commentary to the Kaogongji, Jia Kui's to the Guoyu, Xu Shen's commentary to the Huainanzi, and Sima Biao's to the Zhuangzi.

The Yiqiejing yinyi is not strictly a bilingual dictionary in the modern meaning of Sanskrit headwords and Chinese translation equivalents, it is technically a monolingual dictionary of Chinese Buddhist terms. Although early yinyi glossaries and dictionaries have some basic features of modern bilingual dictionaries, they can be considered as the "most distant forerunners of modern Chinese bilingual dictionaries".

Within the Chinese "pronunciation and meaning" tradition, Huilin's Yiqiejing yinyi became the definitive glossary. Scholars value it for having accurately recorded the pronunciations and understandings of Buddhist technical terms during the Tang dynasty. Yong and Peng call it a "huge masterpiece of notation and interpretation of the sounds and meanings of characters in Buddhist scriptures – exhaustively embracing the ancient exegetic interpretations, phonetically notating the Sanskrit classics – and it is broad in collection and rich in content".

Huilin's Yiqiejing yinyi is valuable for three reasons. It is extremely useful for studying Buddhist scriptures. It is significant to exegesis for providing the pronunciations and meanings of ancient words. And it is the main sourcebook for textual reconstructions, citing many classic works that would otherwise be unknown. According to the Qing scholar of Buddhism Yang Shoujing (楊守敬, 1835–1915), Huilin's Yiqiejing yinyi "is where philological studies reside and a diamond in the academic forest".
