= Jijiupian =

1st-century BCE Chinese dictionary

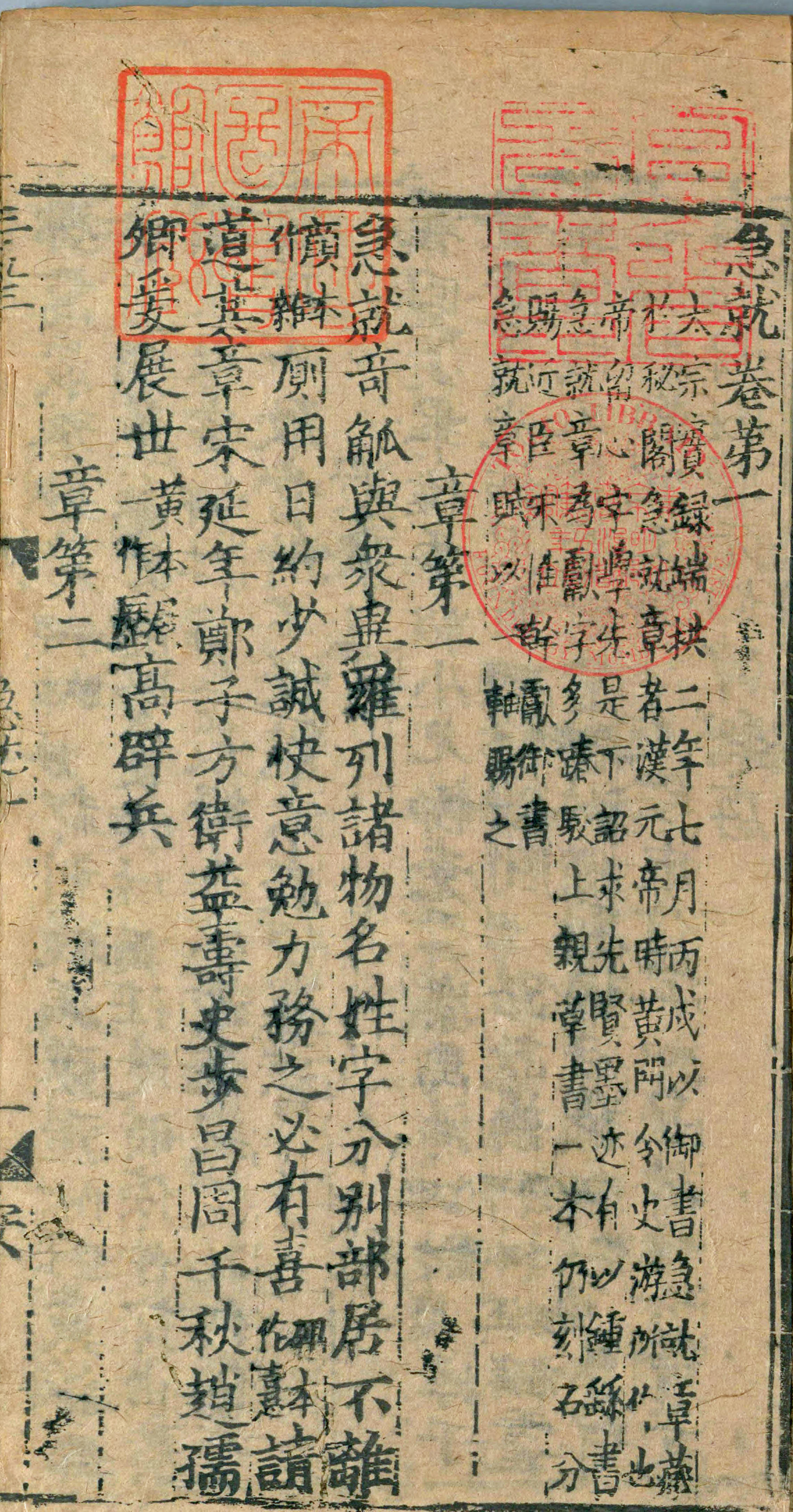
- 1340 edition Jijiupian, National Diet Library

Chinese name
- Chinese: 急就篇
- Literal meaning: Quickly Master [Characters] Chapters
Transcriptions
Standard Mandarin
- Hanyu Pinyin: Jíjiùpiān
- Wade–Giles: Chi-chiu-p'ien
Yue: Cantonese
- Jyutping: Gap^{1}zau^{6}pin^{1}
Southern Min
- Hokkien POJ: Kipchiūphiⁿ
Middle Chinese
- Middle Chinese: Kipdzjuwphjien
Old Chinese
- Baxter–Sagart (2014): [K](r)əp[dz]u[k]-spʰen

Korean name
- Hangul: 急就篇
- Hanja: 급취편
Transcriptions
- McCune–Reischauer: Kŭpch'wip'yŏn

Japanese name
- Kanji: 急就篇
- Hiragana: きゅうしゅうへん
Transcriptions
- Revised Hepburn: Kyūjūhen

The Jijiupian is a Chinese character primer that was compiled by the Han dynasty scholar Shi You around 40 BCE. Similar to an abecedarium, it contains a series of orthographic word lists, categorized according to character radical, and briefly explained in rhymed lines. In the Qin and Han dynasties, several similar orthographic primers were in circulation, such as Cangjiepian, but the Jijiupian is the only one that survived intact for two millennia.

== Title ==
The Jíjiùpiān "Quickly Master [Character] Chapters" is also called the Jíjiùzhāng 急就章 "Quickly Master [Character] Sections" and simply Jíjiù 急就.

The title Jíjiùpiān uses the word piān 篇, which is attested in Han dynasty texts with the meaning of "book, written document" (such as in the Hanshu 漢書 chapter on Wu Di, "著之於篇，朕親覽焉。"). Several other Chinese dictionary titles use pian, for example, the (c. 500? BCE) Shizhoupian "Historian Zhou's Chapters" (c. 220 BCE) Cangjiepian "Cangjie's Chapters" (c. 543) Yupian "Jade Chapters", and (1066) Leipian "Categorized Chapters".

Jíjiù has several possible interpretations, depending on the meanings of jí 急 "urgent; hurrying; rapid; fast; hasty; distress" and jiù 就 "proceed; advance; accomplish; achieve; accomplish; finish". The Science and Civilisation in China collaborators Joseph Needham, Lu Gwei-djen, and Huang Hsing-Tsung say, "One hardly knows how to render its title, unless 'Handy Primer'." Thomas Lee translates jijiu as "quickly getting to". The Chinese lexicographers Heming Yong and Jing Peng say that jijiu 急就 "instant success" suggested "fast learning", as seen in the first words of the Jijiupian preface.

Quickly learn the rarely seen drinking vessels and many different things: listing the names of objects, people, and family names; classify them into different sections so that they will not be easily mixed up. Occasional consultation will definitely be a great delight—for it is quick to retrieve, and, if hard effort is put into it, there will surely be surprising rewards. Please follow the guidelines in each chapter.

This passage is notably the earliest recorded discussion of how to classify characters into different textual sections.

While the title is usually transliterated Jijiupian, Chi-chiu-p'ien, etc., some English translations are:

- Handy Primer
- Quick Access [to Characters]
- Quick mastery of the characters
- The Instant Primer
- Primer for Quickly Learning Chinese Characters
- For Urgent Use
- Wood-Prism Bundles for Rapid Attainment

== History ==
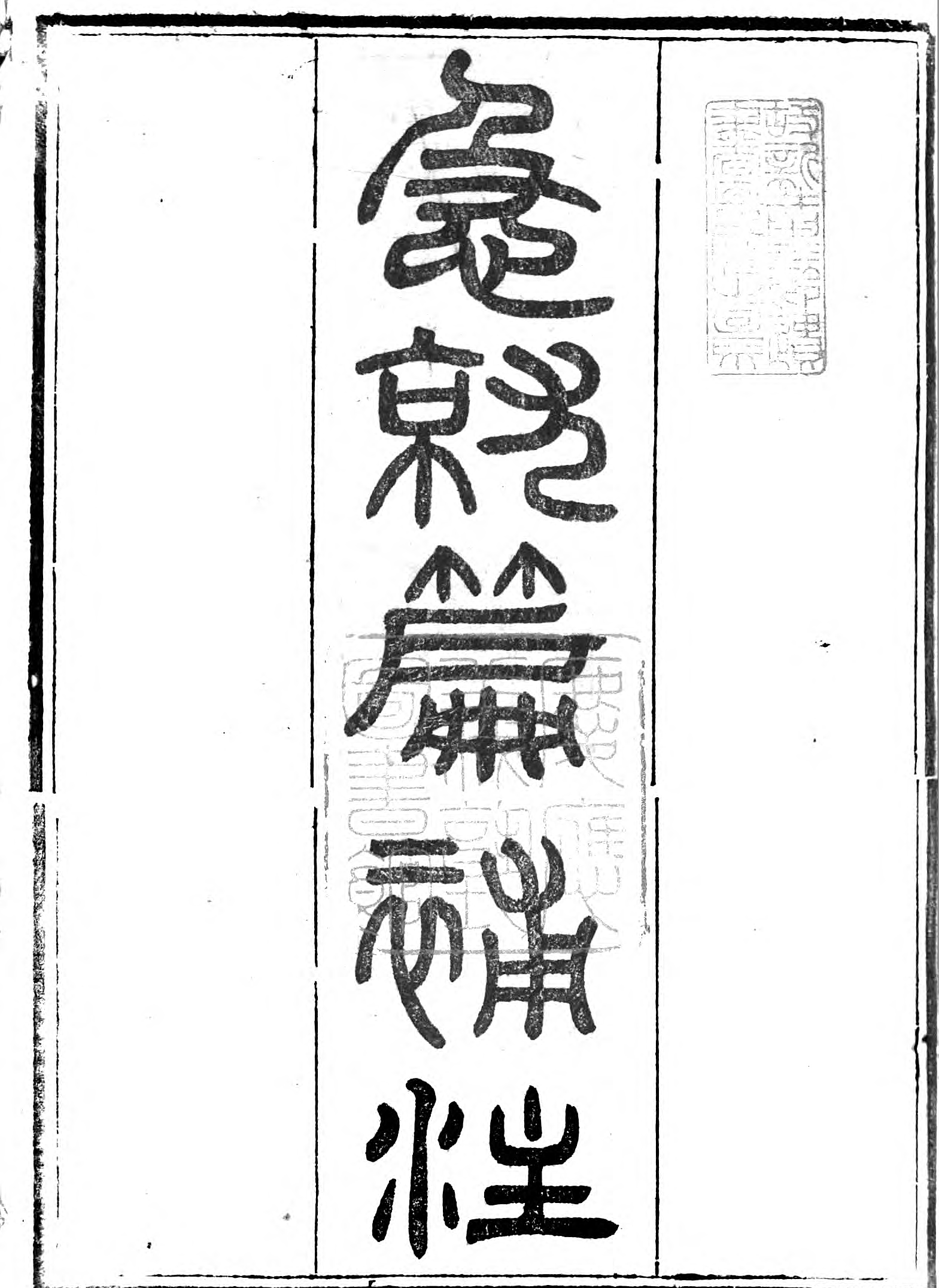
1875 edition Jijiupianfuzhu 急就篇補注 with the Yan Shigu and Wang Yilin commentaries, Keio University Library

The first reference to the Jijiupian and Shi You 史游 is found in the Yiwenzhi "Treatise on Literature" bibliographical section of the (111 CE) Hanshu "Book of Han", listed among early dictionaries: "In the time of Emperor Yuan of Han (r. 48-33 BCE), the court scholar Shi You composed the Jijiupian" (元帝时黄门令史游作急就篇). This section also uses the Jijiu title; Jijiu yipian 急就一篇 "The Jijiu, in one chapter".

In the Western Han dynasty (206 BCE-25 CE), the teaching of characters was emphasized, and scholars compiled other character primers and wordbooks besides the Jijiupian, for instance, the Fanjiangpian 凡將篇 The General Primer by Sima Xiangru (c. 179 – 117 BCE) and 32-7 BCE Yuanshangpian 元尚篇 The Yuanshang Primer by Li Zhang 李長, both of which are lost works. These proto-dictionaries facilitated the development of Chinese xiǎoxué 小學 "minor learning; pre-modern 'linguistics'; philology" (which now means "primary school"), and laid the academic foundation for the compilation of wordbooks, vocabularies, and dictionaries. The Han dynasty experienced the transition of Chinese lexicography from wordlists and glossaries to character dictionaries and word dictionaries. The Jijiupian generalized the practice of logically classifying characters into different sections, which inspired the "macro-level stylistic format of the Chinese dictionary".

From the Han to the Six Dynasties (220–589), the most popular character textbook was the Jijiupian. During the Northern and Southern dynasties (420–589), several other popular textbooks appeared, such as the Qianziwen "Thousand Characters Text", Baijiaxing "Myriad Family Surnames", and Sanzijing "Three-character Classic". By the Tang, the Jijiupian had been replaced by the Qianziwen and Baijiaxing, both of which were deliberately written so that few characters they contain occur more than once. They were memorized generation after generation for over 1,000 years. In the Yuan dynasty (1271–1368) and Qing dynasty (1644–1912), the most popular primer was the Sanzijing. Contemporary Chinese scholarship admires the Jijiupian because of its high factual content as contrasted with the much more moralistic tendencies of similar later works such as the Sanzijing.

The Jijiupian was one of several similar wordbooks that circulated widely during the Qin and Han periods, but it alone survived to the present day, owing to several factors. One reason for its preservation was a model version written by the famous Jin dynasty Chinese calligrapher Wang Xizhi (303–361), which was copied by generation after generation of literati eager to perfect their calligraphy. The Yuan dynasty calligrapher Zhao Mengfu (1254–1322) also produced an orthographic model Jijiupian. Another factor was the textual explanations written by famous authors in later dynasties. The Tang scholar Yan Shigu wrote a (620) commentary, and the Song scholar Wang Yinglin 王應麟 wrote the (1280) Xingshi Jijiupian 姓氏急就篇.

Modern archeological excavations have found fragments of the Jijiupian, and even some tablets on which the inscriptions were evidently exercises in copying characters.

== Text ==
Pages from a printed edition of the Jijiupian, from the Shanghai Library

Pages from a printed copy of the Jijiupian, from the Harvard University

The original Jijiupian consisted of 32 sections (zhang 章), each with 63 Chinese characters, totaling 2,016. Some later editions of the text add two more sections, each with 64 characters, thus totaling 2,144. The text was designed to include as many different characters as possible, with little repetition, in order to maximize the student's exposure to and learning of new words. The text is described as a sort of abecedarium.

The Jijiupian collation puts together characters written with the same radical or signific, and then divides them into chapters. Within each chapter, the style consisted mainly of 3-, 4-, or 7-syllable rhyming lines, as in Chinese poetry. Rhyme makes it easy to read, memorize, and recite.

China's first "word books" were written to meet the needs of literacy education. Shi You's Jijiupian was intended to be used for learning the meanings of basic characters and how they should properly be written. It formed a basis for verbal elaborations by teachers, and could have served as a handy reference manual for scribes and copyists. The original Han edition Jijiupian was written in clerical script, but it was later used for learning to write in other calligraphic styles of characters, such as regular script and cursive script.

The Jijiupian has historical linguistic value as a record of common words that were current during the Han dynasty. It preserved many technical terms and names of plants, animals, tools, and objects, which are important for the histories of science, medicine, and technology. For instance, the Jijiupian was the first text to describe the trip hammer and waterwheel.

To illustrate the types of lists that the Jijiupian contains, and their value for those who wished to write correctly, consider the Section 24 list of traditional Chinese herbal medicines, written in rhymed 7-character lines.

灸刺和药逐去邪 By moxa, acupuncture and the compounding of drugs we may drive out the malign (qi that cause illness). (Of drugs and drug-plants there are:) Huángqín 黄芩 Scutellaria lateriflora, fúlíng 伏苓 Wolfiporia cocos, yù 礜 arsenolite, and cháihú 茈胡 Bupleurum falcatum. Mǔméng 牡蒙 Rubia yunnanensis, gāncǎo 甘草 Glycyrrhiza glabra, wǎn 菀 Aster tataricus, and lílú 藜蘆 Veratrum niqrum. Wūhuì 烏喙 and fùzǐ 附子 both Aconitum carmichaelii, jiāo 椒, Zanthoxylum piperitum, and yánhuá 芫花 Daphne genkwa. Bànxià 半夏 Pinellia ternata, zàojiá 皂莢 Gleditsia sinensis, ài 艾 Artemisia argyi, and tuówú 橐吾 Ligularia sibirica.

The rhyme-words (Old Chinese reconstructions from Baxter-Sagart 2014) are: *sə.ɢa 邪, *ɡˁa 胡, *rˁa 蘆, *qʷʰˁra 花, and *ŋˁa 吾. With the exception of the mineral arsenolite (arsenic oxide), most of these names are written with the "plant radical" 艸 or 艹, which is commonly used in characters for plants and trees.

The text "impresses readers with its balanced content and ingenuity", and some examples are:

To buy on credit, to borrow, to sell and to buy, these activities give convenience to merchants and markets….To cut, to mince, to broil and to cook a whole piece of meat, each has its own shape….Rooms, houses, and inns are [for people] to rest and there are also towers, palaces, and halls….Various ranked lords have their fiefs, lands, and household vassals; these [privileges] come from hard studies, but not from [the help of] ghosts or spirits.

The Jijiupian teaches students basic vocabulary for daily life, with occasional moral lessons.
