= List of Shuowen Jiezi radicals =

A list of the 540 radicals of the Shuowen Jiezi in the original seal script

The Shuowen Jiezi dictionary created by Xu Shen uses 540 radicals to index its characters.

== List ==
Volume	Radicals
1	(Introduction)
2	一丄示三王玉玨气士丨屮艸蓐茻
3	小八釆半牛犛告口凵吅哭走止癶步此正是辵彳廴㢟行齒牙足疋品龠冊
4	㗊舌干𧮫只㕯句丩古十卅言誩音䇂丵菐𠬞𠬜共異舁𦥑䢅爨革鬲䰜爪丮鬥又𠂇史支𦘒聿畫隶臤臣殳殺𠘧寸皮㼱攴教卜用爻㸚
5	𡕥目䀠眉盾自𪞶鼻皕習羽隹奞雈𦫳𥄕羊羴瞿雔雥鳥烏𠦒冓幺𢆶叀玄予放𠬪𣦼歺死冎骨肉筋刀刃㓞丯耒
6	角竹箕丌左工㠭巫甘曰乃丂可兮号亏旨喜壴鼓豈豆豊豐䖒虍虎虤皿𠙴去血丶丹青井皀鬯食亼會倉入缶矢高冂𩫖京亯㫗畗㐭嗇來麥夊舛舜韋弟夂久桀
7	木東林才叒之帀出𣎵生乇𠂹𠌶華𥝌稽巢桼束㯻囗員貝邑𨛜
8	日旦倝㫃冥晶月有朙囧夕多毌𢎘𣐺𠧪齊朿片鼎克彔禾秝黍香米毇臼凶朩𣏟麻尗耑韭瓜瓠宀宮呂穴㝱疒冖𠔼冃㒳网襾巾巿帛白㡀黹
9	人𠤎匕从比北丘㐺𡈼重臥身㐆衣裘老毛毳尸尺尾履舟方儿兄兂皃𠑹先禿見覞欠㱃㳄旡頁
10	𦣻面丏首𥄉須彡彣文髟后司卮卩印色𠨍辟勹包茍鬼甶厶嵬山屾屵广厂丸危石長勿冄而豕㣇彑豚豸𤉡易象
11	馬𢊁鹿麤㲋兔萈犬㹜鼠能熊火炎黑囪焱炙赤大亦夨夭交尣壺壹幸奢亢夲夰亣夫立竝囟思心惢
12	水沝瀕𡿨巜川泉灥永𠂢谷仌雨雲魚𩺰燕龍飛非卂
13	𠃉不至西鹵鹽戶門耳𦣞手𠦬女毋民丿𠂆乁氏氐戈戉我亅珡乚亡匸匚曲甾瓦弓弜弦系
14	糸素絲率虫䖵蟲風它龜黽卵二土垚堇里田畕黃男力劦
15	金幵勺几且斤斗矛車𠂤𨸏𨺅厽四宁叕亞五六七九禸嘼甲乙丙丁戊己巴庚辛辡壬癸子了孨𠫓丑寅卯辰巳午未申酉酋戌亥

== Seal script - regular script comparison ==
=== Vol. 2 ===
一	001 一	⼆	002 ⼆	示	003 示	三	004 三	王	005 王
玉	006 玉	玨	007 玨	气	008 气	士	009 士	丨	010 丨
屮	011 屮	艸	012 艸	蓐	013 蓐	茻	014 茻		

=== Vol. 3 ===
小	015 小	八	016 八	釆	017 釆	半	018 半	牛	019 牛
犛	020 犛	告	021 告	口	022 口	凵	023 凵	吅	024 吅
哭	025 哭	走	026 走	止	027 止	癶	028 癶	步	029 步
此	030 此	正	031 正	是	032 是	辵	033 辵	彳	034 彳
廴	035 廴	㢟	036 㢟	行	037 行	齒	038 齒	牙	039 牙
足	040 足	疋	041 疋	品	042 品	龠	043 龠	冊	044 冊

=== Vol. 4 ===
㗊	045 㗊	舌	046 舌	干	047 干	𧮫	048 𧮫	只	049 只
㕯	050 㕯	句	051 句	丩	052 𠃚	古	053 古	十	054 十
卅	055 卅	言	056 言	誩	057 誩	音	058 音	䇂	059 䇂
丵	060 丵	菐	061 菐	𠬞	062 𠬞	𠬜	063 𠬜	共	064 共
異	065 異	舁	066 舁	𦥑	067 𦥑	䢅	068 䢅	爨	069 爨
革	070 革	鬲	071 鬲	䰜	072 䰜	爪	073 爪	丮	074 丮
鬥	075 鬥	又	076 又	𠂇	077 𠂇	史	078 史	支	079 支
𦘒	080 𦘒	聿	081 聿	畫	082 畫	隶	083 隶	臤	084 臤
臣	085 臣	殳	086 殳	殺	087 殺	𠘧	088 𠘧	寸	089 寸
皮	090 皮	㼱	091 㼱	攴	092 攴	教	093 教	卜	094 卜
用	095 用	爻	096 爻	㸚	097 㸚				

=== Vol. 5 ===
𡕥	098 𡕥	目	099 目	䀠	100 䀠	眉	101 眉	盾	102 盾
自	103 自	𪞶	104 𪞶	鼻	105 鼻	皕	106 皕	習	107 習
羽	108 羽	隹	109 隹	奞	110 奞	雈	111 雈	𦫳	112 𦫳
𥄕	113 𥄕	羊	114 羊	羴	115 羴	瞿	116 瞿	雔	117 雔
雥	118 雥	鳥	119 鳥	烏	120 烏	𠦒	121 𠦒	冓	122 冓
幺	123 幺	𢆶	124 𢆶	叀	125 叀	玄	126 玄	予	127 予
放	128 放	𠬪	129 𠬪	𣦼	130 𣦼	歺	131 歺	死	132 死
冎	133 冎	骨	134 骨	肉	135 肉	筋	136 筋	刀	137 刀
刃	138 刃	㓞	139 㓞	丯	140 丯	耒	141 耒		

=== Vol. 6 ===
角	142 角	竹	143 竹	箕	144 箕	丌	145 丌	左	146 左
工	147 工	㠭	148 㠭	巫	149 巫	甘	150 甘	旨	151 旨
曰	152 曰	乃	153 乃	丂	154 丂	可	155 可	兮	156 兮
号	157 号	亏	158 亏	喜	159 喜	壴	160 壴	鼓	161 鼓
豈	162 豈	豆	163 豆	豊	164 豊	豐	165 豐	䖒	166 䖒
虍	167 虍	虎	168 虎	虤	169 虤	皿	170 皿	𠙴	171 𠙴
去	172 去	血	173 血	丶	174 丶	丹	175 丹	青	176 青
井	177 井	皀	178 皀	鬯	179 鬯	食	180 食	亼	181 亼
會	182 會	倉	183 倉	入	184 入	缶	185 缶	矢	186 矢
高	187 高	冂	188 冂	𩫖	189 𩫖	京	190 京	亯	191 亯
㫗	192 㫗	畗	193 畗	㐭	194 㐭	嗇	195 嗇	來	196 來
麥	197 麥	夊	198 夊	舛	199 舛	舜	200 舜	韋	201 韋
弟	202 弟	夂	203 夂	久	204 久	桀	205 桀		

=== Vol. 7 ===
木	206 木	東	207 東	林	208 林	才	209 才	叒	210 叒
之	211 之	帀	212 帀	出	213 出	𣎵	214 𣎵	生	215 生
乇	216 乇	𠂹	217 𠂹	𠌶	218 𠌶	華	219 華	𥝌	220 𥝌
稽	221 稽	巢	222 巢	桼	223 桼	束	224 束	㯻	225 㯻
囗	226 囗	員	227 員	貝	228 貝	邑	229 邑	𨛜	230 𨛜

=== Vol. 8 ===
日	231 日	旦	232 旦	倝	233 倝	㫃	234 㫃	冥	235 冥
晶	236 晶	月	237 月	有	238 有	朙	239 朙	囧	240 囧
夕	241 夕	多	242 多	毌	243 毌	𢎘	244 𢎘	𣐺	245 𣐺
𠧪	246 𠧪	齊	247 齊	朿	248 朿	片	249 片	鼎	250 鼎
克	251 克	彔	252 彔	禾	253 禾	秝	254 秝	黍	255 黍
香	256 香	米	257 米	毇	258 毇	臼	259 臼	凶	260 凶
朩	261 朩	𣏟	262 𣏟	麻	263 麻	尗	264 尗	耑	265 耑
韭	266 韭	瓜	267 瓜	瓠	268 瓠	宀	269 宀	宮	270 宮
呂	271 呂	穴	272 穴	㝱	273 㝱	疒	274 疒	冖	275 冖
𠔼	276 𠔼	冃	277 冃	㒳	278 㒳	网	279 网	襾	280 襾
巾	281 巾	巿	282 巿	帛	283 帛	白	284 白	㡀	285 㡀
黹	286 黹								

=== Vol. 9 ===
人	287 人	𠤎	288 𠤎	匕	289 匕	从	290 从	比	291 比
北	292 北	丘	293 丘	㐺	294 㐺	𡈼	295 𡈼	重	296 重
臥	297 臥	身	298 身	㐆	299 㐆	衣	300 衣	裘	301 裘
老	302 老	毛	303 毛	毳	304 毳	尸	305 尸	尺	306 尺
尾	307 尾	履	308 履	舟	309 舟	方	310 方	儿	311 儿
兄	312 兄	兂	313 兂	皃	314 皃	𠑹	315 𠑹	先	316 先
禿	317 禿	見	318 見	覞	319 覞	欠	320 欠	㱃	321 㱃
㳄	322 㳄	旡	323 旡	頁	324 頁				

=== Vol. 10 ===
𦣻	325 𦣻	面	326 面	丏	327 丏	首	328 首	𥄉	329 𥄉
須	330 須	彡	331 彡	彣	332 彣	文	333 文	髟	334 髟
后	335 后	司	336 司	卮	337 卮	卩	338 卩	印	339 印
色	340 色	𠨍	341 𠨍	辟	342 辟	勹	343 勹	包	344 包
茍	345 茍	鬼	346 鬼	甶	347 甶	厶	348 厶	嵬	349 嵬
山	350 山	屾	351 屾	屵	352 屵	广	353 广	厂	354 厂
丸	355 丸	危	356 危	石	357 石	長	358 長	勿	359 勿
冄	360 冄	而	361 而	豕	362 豕	㣇	363 㣇	彑	364 彑
豚	365 豚	豸	366 豸	𤉡	367 𤉡	易	368 易	象	369 象

=== Vol. 11 ===
馬	370 馬	𢊁	371 𢊁	鹿	372 鹿	麤	373 麤	㲋	374 㲋
兔	375 兔	萈	376 萈	犬	377 犬	㹜	378 㹜	鼠	379 鼠
能	380 能	熊	381 熊	火	382 火	炎	383 炎	黑	384 黑
囪	385 囪	焱	386 焱	炙	387 炙	赤	388 赤	大	389 大
亦	390 亦	夨	391 夨	夭	392 夭	交	393 交	尣	394 尣
壺	395 壺	壹	396 壹	幸	397 幸	奢	398 奢	亢	399 亢
夲	400 夲	夰	401 夰	亣	402 亣	夫	403 夫	立	404 立
竝	405 竝	囟	406 囟	思	407 思	心	408 心	惢	409 惢

=== Vol. 12 ===
水	410 水	沝	411 沝	瀕	412 瀕	𡿨	413 𡿨	巜	414 巜
川	415 川	泉	416 泉	灥	417 灥	永	418 永	𠂢	419 𠂢
谷	420 谷	仌	421 仌	雨	422 雨	雲	423 雲	魚	424 魚
𩺰	425 𩺰	燕	426 燕	龍	427 龍	飛	428 飛	非	429 非
卂	430 卂								

=== Vol. 13 ===
𠃉	431 𠃉	不	432 不	至	433 至	西	434 西	鹵	435 鹵
鹽	436 鹽	戶	437 戶	門	438 門	耳	439 耳	𦣞	440 𦣞
手	441 手	𠦬	442 𠦬	女	443 女	毋	444 毋	民	445 民
丿	446 丿	𠂆	447 𠂆	乁	448 乁	氏	449 氏	氐	450 氐
戈	451 戈	戉	452 戉	我	453 我	亅	454 亅	珡	455 珡
乚	456 乚	亡	457 亡	匸	458 匸	匚	459 匚	曲	460 曲
甾	461 甾	瓦	462 瓦	弓	463 弓	弜	464 弜	弦	465 弦
系	466 系								

=== Vol. 14 ===
糸	467 糸	素	468 素	絲	469 絲	率	470 率	虫	471 虫
䖵	472 䖵	蟲	473 蟲	風	474 風	它	475 它	龜	476 龜
黽	477 黽	卵	478 卵	二	479 二	土	480 土	垚	481 垚
堇	482 堇	里	483 里	田	484 田	畕	485 畕	黃	486 黃
男	487 男	力	488 力	劦	489 劦				

=== Vol. 15 ===
金	490 金	幵	491 幵	勺	492 勺	几	493 几	且	494 且
斤	495 斤	斗	496 斗	矛	497 矛	車	498 車	𠂤	499 𠂤
𨸏	500 𨸏	𨺅	501 𨺅	厽	502 厽	四	503 四	宁	504 宁
叕	505 叕	亞	506 亞	五	507 五	六	508 六	七	509 七
九	510 九	禸	511 禸	嘼	512 嘼	甲	513 甲	乙	514 乙
丙	515 丙	丁	516 丁	戊	517 戊	己	518 己	巴	519 巴
庚	520 庚	辛	521 辛	辡	522 辡	壬	523 壬	癸	524 癸
子	525 子	了	526 了	孨	527 孨	𠫓	528 𠫓	丑	529 丑
寅	530 寅	卯	531 卯	辰	532 辰	巳	533 巳	午	534 午
未	535 未	申	536 申	酉	537 酉	酋	538 酋	戌	539 戌
亥	540 亥								

== See also ==
- List of Kangxi radicals － a system of 214 components used by the Kangxi dictionary (1716), made under the leadership of the Kangxi Emperor
- List of Unicode radicals － CJK radicals included in the Unicode Standard.
- List of Xinhua Zidian radicals
- Chinese characters description languages － computer and SVG based description of CJK characters
- CJK characters

== Sources ==
- Cook, Richard (2001), The Extreme of Typographic Complexity:Character Set Issues Relating to Computerization of The Eastern Han Chinese Lexicon Shuowenjiezi (PDF), STEDT Project, Linguistic Department, University of California, Berkeley, pp. 28–29: List of the 540 radicals in Xiaozhuan
- (in Chinese) 《說文解字》, electronic edition - Donald Sturgeon
- (in Chinese) 《说文解字注》 全文检索 - 许慎撰 段玉裁注, facsimile edition
- Shuowenjiezi.com, by the CRLAO research institut, Paris, France.
