= Ziyuan (book) =

Chinese dictionary

The Ziyuan (Chinese: 字苑; pinyin: Zìyuàn; Wade–Giles: Tzu-yüan; lit. 'Character Garden'; or "Essays on Chinese Characters") was a Chinese dictionary attributed to the Eastern Jin Dynasty scholar Ge Hong. The original text was lost, and the small modern Ziyuan recension has 34 headwords, mostly Chinese Buddhist loanword terminology.

Both the Old Book of Tang and the New Book of Tang record that the Ziyuan was one juan long.

The Ziyuan is notable for being the first lexicographical work to record the meaning and pronunciation of the loanword ta (塔; tǎ; t'a; "tower; pagoda"). The word had previously been used in Buddhist scriptures translated into Chinese by Lokaksema, around 179 CE. There, it referred to a space for enshrining the Buddha's sacred relics. The Ziyuan defined ta thus:

塔,佛堂也; "The 'ta' is Buddhist tower"

Ta originated with the Sanskrit word buddhastupa. Its pronunciation in Chinese is thought to have adapted as follows: buddhastupa→stupa→tupa→t’ap.
