= Leipian =

Chinese dictionary

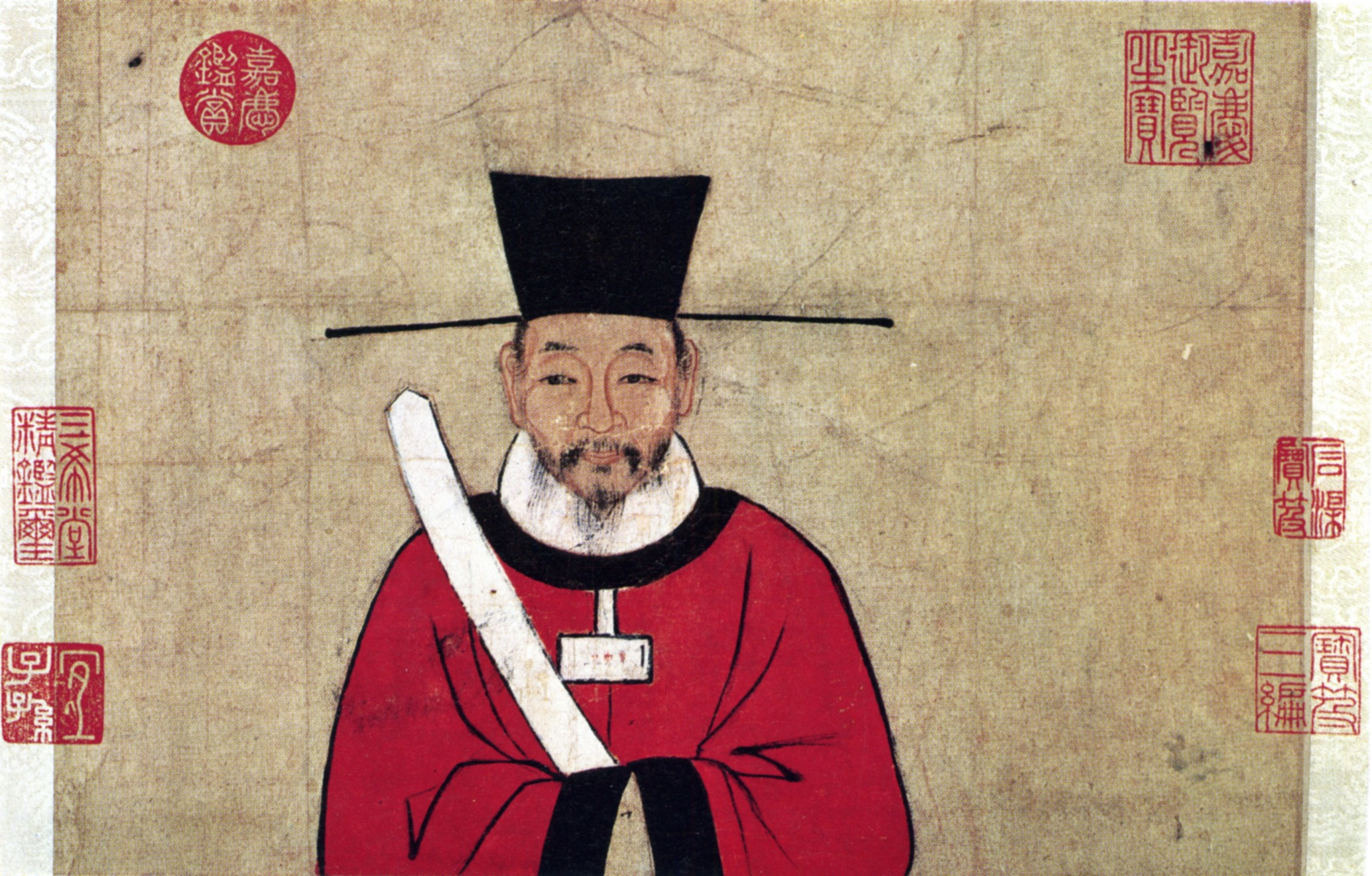
- Song dynasty painting of Sima Guang

Chinese name
- Traditional Chinese: 類篇
- Simplified Chinese: 类篇
- Literal meaning: categorized chapters
Transcriptions
Standard Mandarin
- Hanyu Pinyin: Lèipiān
- Wade–Giles: Lei-p'ien
Yue: Cantonese
- Jyutping: Leoi^{6}pin^{1}
Southern Min
- Hokkien POJ: Luiphiⁿ
Middle Chinese
- Middle Chinese: Lwijphjien
Old Chinese
- Baxter–Sagart (2014): [R]u[t]-spʰen

Korean name
- Hangul: 類篇
- Hanja: 류편
Transcriptions
- McCune–Reischauer: Ryup'yŏn

Japanese name
- Kanji: 類篇
- Hiragana: るいへん
Transcriptions
- Revised Hepburn: Ruihen

The (1066) Leipian 類篇 is a Chinese dictionary compiled by Song dynasty (960–1279) lexicographers under the supervision of chancellor Sima Guang. It contains 31,319 character head entries, more than twice as many as the 12,158 in the (c. 543) Yupian, and included many new characters created during the Tang (618–907) and Song dynasties. Leipian entries are arranged by a 544-radical system adapted from the 540 radicals of the classic (121) Shuowen Jiezi.

== Text ==
The dictionary title combines two common Chinese words: lèi 類 " category; kind; type; class" and piān 篇 "piece of writing; sheet (of paper); chapter". Piān 篇, written with the "bamboo radical" ⺮ and biǎn 扁 "flat" phonetic, originally meant "bamboo slip (for writing)", comparable with biān 編 "weave; organize; compile" with the "silk radical" 糸—seen in the (1726) Pianzi leipian 駢字類編 "Classified Collection of Phrases and Literary Allusions" dictionary title.

English translations include Dictionary of Character Sounds, Collection of Categorized Characters, The Classified Chapters, and The Categories Book.

The Leipian text consists of 15 books (册), each subdivided into 3 parts, for a total of 45 volumes (卷). The 31,319 character head entries are organized by a 544-radical system. Each entry gives the character in Small Seal Script (following the Shuowen jiezi format), the pronunciation in the fanqie system, definition, and exegesis. The Leipian also notes variant characters, alternate pronunciations, and multiple meanings.

== History ==
Emperor Renzong of Song (r. 1022–1063) commissioned the Leipian character dictionary project in 1039 and it was completed in 1066. There were four chief editors, three of whom died before completing the dictionary: Wang Zhu 王洙 (997–1057), Hu Xiu 胡宿 (995–1067), Zhang Cili 張次立 (1010–1063), and Fan Zhen 范鎮 (1007–1088).

Emperor Renzong also ordered the compilation of the (1037) Jiyun, which was a phonologically arranged rime dictionary intended to complement the Leipian character dictionary. The Leipian Preface says all phonetically related characters are included in the Jiyun while all formally related ones are included in the Leipian.

The historian and chancellor Sima Guang (1019–1086) carried out the final editing on the expanded Jiyun and the Leipian, and in 1067, he submitted the printed versions of both dictionaries to Emperor Yingzong of Song (r. 1063–1067). At that time, the Jiyun and Leipian were the most complete reference works in the history of Chinese lexicography.
