= Cangjiepian =

Chinese dictionary (c. 220 BCE)

Chinese name
- Traditional Chinese: 倉頡篇
- Simplified Chinese: 仓颉篇
- Literal meaning: Cangjie's Chapters
Transcriptions
Standard Mandarin
- Hanyu Pinyin: Cāngjiépiān
- Wade–Giles: Tsʻang¹-chieh²-pʻien¹
Yue: Cantonese
- Yale Romanization: Cōng Kit Pīn
- Jyutping: Cong^{1}kit^{3}pin^{1}
Southern Min
- Hokkien POJ: Chhongkhiatphiⁿ
Middle Chinese
- Middle Chinese: Tshanghangphjien
Old Chinese
- Baxter–Sagart (2014): ˤaŋ[g]ˤaŋspʰen

Vietnamese name
- Vietnamese alphabet: Thương Hiệt thiên
- Hán-Nôm: 倉頡篇

Korean name
- Hangul: 창힐편
- Hanja: 倉頡篇
Transcriptions
- Revised Romanization: Changhilpyeon
- McCune–Reischauer: Ch'anghilp'yŏn

Japanese name
- Kanji: 倉頡篇
- Hiragana: そうけつへん
Transcriptions
- Revised Hepburn: Sōketsuhen

The Cangjiepian, also known as the Three Chapters (三倉, sāncāng), was a c. 220 BCE Chinese primer and a prototype for Chinese dictionaries. Li Si, Chancellor of the Qin dynasty (221–206 BCE), compiled it for the purpose of reforming written Chinese into the new orthographic standard Small Seal Script. Beginning in the Han dynasty (206 BCE – 221 CE), many scholars and lexicographers expanded and annotated the Cangjiepian. By the end of the Tang dynasty (618–907), it had become a lost work, but in 1977, archeologists discovered a cache of (c. 165 BCE) texts written on bamboo strips, including fragments of the Cangjiepian.

== Title ==
The eponymous Cangjiepian title derives from the culture hero Cangjie, the legendary Yellow Emperor's historian and inventor of Chinese writing. According to Chinese mythology, Cangjie, who had four eyes and remarkable cognizance, created Chinese characters after observing natural phenomena such as the footprints of birds and animals.

In Modern Standard Chinese usage, the name "Cangjie" is most commonly known and used in the Cangjie method of inputting Chinese characters into a computer, rather than for the ancient Cangjiepian proto-dictionary.

In the name Cāngjié or Cāng Jié, cāng 倉/仓 means "storehouse; warehouse" and is sometimes written 蒼/苍 "dark green; blue; gray; ashy", which is a common Chinese surname. The character 頡/颉 is only pronounced jié in this name, and is usually pronounced xié "stretch the neck; fly up (of birds)".

The piān 篇 in Cangjiepian originally meant "bamboo strips used for writing (before the invention of paper)", which was semantically extended to "sheet (of paper/etc.); piece of writing; article; chapter; section; book". The sinologists Li Feng and David Branner describe pian as "separate textual unit". The original Cangjiepian, like most Qin and Han era books, was written on bamboo and wood strips.

== History ==
In the traditional history of Chinese lexicography, the first proto-dictionary primers were the Eastern Zhou dynasty Shizhoupian "Historian Zhou's Chapters", the Qin dynasty Cangjiepian, and the Han dynasty Jijiupian. The Chinese lexicographers Heming Yong and Jing Peng say these texts that arranged characters into categories "acted as the catalyst for the birth of ancient Chinese dictionaries".

During the Warring States period (475–221 BCE), there was a wide and confusing variety of unstandardized Large Seal Script characters, with the same word being written in several different ways. After Emperor Qin Shi Huang had conquered all other Warring States and unified China in 221 BCE, he adopted a language-reform proposal made by the Legalist Li Si and promulgated a decree of Shutongwen 書同文 "Writing the Same Character". It mandated using a consistent writing system based on the Small Seal Script, which was comparatively simpler and easier to write than Large Seal Script. In a logographic language like Chinese, correct character writing is fundamental for efficiency of information transfer.

The emperor ordered his chancellor and two other ministers to compile a standard Small Seal character wordbook in three parts. The 7-chapter Cangjiepian compilation was overseen by Li Si, the 6-chapter Yuanlipian 爰歷篇 "Explanation of Difficult Words" by Zhao Gao, and the 7-chapter Boxuepian 博學篇 "Extensive Knowledge of Words" by Humu Jing 胡毋敬. They simplified, standardized, and disseminated a national standard script for the first time in China. These three textbooks were officially issued and circulated during the short-lived Qin dynasty (221–206 BCE).

Scholars in the early Han dynasty (206 BCE – 220 CE) combined these three Qin texts into one book, and transcribed the original Small Seal script into the standard Han Clerical script. Ban Gu's Book of Han records,

the teachers and learned people in the towns and villages combined The Cangjie Primer, The Yuanli Primer, and The Scholarly Primer [i.e., Boxuepian] under one cover and segmented the book into fifty-five chapters, each chapter containing sixty characters. This new textbook retained the original title The Cangjie Primer.

This 3,300-character Cangjiepian, commonly called the Sancang 三倉 "Three Cangs", became popular and was widely recognized as the standard textbook for character learning. Scribes at the beginning of the Han were expected to be able to recite 5,000 characters, which is more than the original Cangjiepian.

The Book of the Han further says that about 60 BCE, during the reign of Emperor Xuan of Han (r. 74–49 BCE), the Cangjiepian was "filled with obsolete characters that are difficult for ordinary teachers to read". The emperor called for scholars who could pronounce them correctly, and Zhang Chang was chosen. After he died in 48 BCE, his grandson-in-law Du Lin 杜林 completed the Collections of Cangjie Exegesis, which was lost by the Sui dynasty (518–618).

The Cangjiepian had a serious pedagogical shortcoming: some Chinese characters could only be understood with the help of specialized annotations, and many came forth. The Han philosopher and philologist Yang Xiong (53 BCE – 18 CE) first revised the Cangjiepian and wrote the Cangjiexunzuan 倉頡訓纂 Collections of Cangjie Exegesis supplement, which had 5,340 characters. In the reign of Emperor He of Han (88–105 CE), Jia Fang 賈魴 compiled another supplement named the Pangxipian 滂喜篇.

During the Jin dynasty (266–420) period, the Cangjiepian, Xunzuanpian, and Pangxipian were combined into one 3-chapter book with the title Cangjiepian, also called the Sancang. According to the Records of the Three Kingdoms (biography of Jiang Shi), in the early Cao Wei dynasty, Zhang Yi (fl. 227–232) wrote the Picang 埤倉 The Augmented Cangjie Glossary, Guangya The Broad Ready Guide [sic], and Gujin zigu 古今字詁 The Exegesis of Ancient and Contemporary Characters. Guo Pu (276–324) wrote a commentary to the Sancang, which is lost.

Fan Ye's Book of the Later Han says that when Xu Shen started compiling the Shuowen jiezi, he used ten dictionaries and primers, including the Cangjiepian (inclusive Sancang version) The Cangjie Primer, Cangjiezhuan 倉頡傳 The Biography of Cangjie, both Yang Xiong's and Du Lin's Cangjiexunzuan 倉頡訓纂 Collections of Cangjie Exegesis, and the Cangjiegu 倉頡故 The Exegesis of the Cangjie Primer.

The Cangjiepian was continuously used until the end of the Tang dynasty, when the last remaining copies were destroyed during the Huang Chao Rebellion (874–884). Various Qing dynasty (1644–1912) scholars partially reconstructed the text by collecting fragments quotations of the Cangjiepian in works such as the Wenxuan and Taiping Imperial Reader.

Archeologists have discovered Cangjiepian fragments in several locations, including the Dunhuang manuscripts from the Mogao Caves in Gansu province, at Juyan Lake Basin in westernmost Inner Mongolia, and most notably at the Shuanggudui archeological site, located near Fuyang in Anhui province. In 1977, archeologists excavated a (165 BCE) Han dynasty tomb at Shuanggudui and discovered a cache of texts written on bamboo strips, including the Yijing and Chuci. The Cangjiepian version has 541 characters, nearly 20 percent of the complete work, and is longer and more legible than the other fragments; Theobald provides pictures of these strips. The Cangjiepian fragments excavated from Northwest China during 1930s and 1970s repeatedly state that "Cang Jie invented writing" in order to instruct the later generations. The presence of the Cangjiepian in several early Han tombs shows that it was, "if not a common manual for elementary instruction, at least not a rare work."

While some academics conclude that the Cangjiepian "demonstrated the prototype of a modern Chinese dictionary", believe this character-learning textbook's format was "not particularly standardized and consistent to the eye of a modern lexicographer". Nevertheless, they admit it is undeniable that the Cangjiepian "laid a solid foundation and initiated an enlightening start in character standardization, corpus construction, and source material accumulation".

== Text ==
The excavated Han dynasty bamboo-slip Cangjiepian edition has two outstanding features in layout: rhymed 4-character phrases that are easy to recite and remember, and character collation that is semantically grouped and graphic radical-oriented.

First, the Cangjiepian format has rhymed (in Qin period Old Chinese), 4-character phrases/sentences that are easy for children to recite and memorize. Take the Preface for example,

Cangjie creates characters [*s-ta 書] for educating the young [*sə.lə-s 嗣]. The youth are summoned [*taw-s 詔] and they should learn to be serious, cautious, respectful, and self-disciplined [*kˤrək-s 戒]. They should make up their mind and study hard [*sə-loŋ-s 誦] and show perseverance [sic] in reading and reciting day and night [*trək-s 置]. If selected to serve as officials in the government [*s-rəʔ 史], they should be qualified in calculating, accounting, discriminating good from evil, and ruling [*C.lrə 治]. They should be trained to be the elites [*[ɡ]ur 群] and the exceptional but not the deviants [*ɢək-s 異].

The Cangjiepian adapted the prevalent style of writing Chinese poetry in 4-character lines, which dates back to the (11th–7th centuries BCE) Classic of Poetry. Later poetry was composed in 5- and 7-character lines.

Some Cangjiepian passages seem incongruous for a children's primer, for instance (quoted by Yan Zhitui), "The Han Dynasty annexes the whole world and all the kingdoms observe its decrees. Its ruling will be like slaughtering the pigs and pulling down the fences. For those kingdoms that disobey, they will be denounced, suppressed, and destroyed".

Second, the Cangjiepian collated characters on the basis of semantic fields (already used in the 3rd-century BCE Erya dictionary) and graphic radicals (later used in the 121 CE Shuowen Jiezi).

Some sections give characters for words that are synonyms, antonyms, or otherwise semantically related. An example of words meaning "length" is: cùn 寸 "inch", báo 薄 "thin", hòu 厚 "thick", guǎng 廣 "wide", xiá 狹 "narrow", hǎo 好 "good", chǒu 醜 "ugly", cháng 長 "long", and duǎn 短 "short".

Other sections give characters that share a common radical, and furthermore, the sequence of radicals generally resembles the sequence of the 540 radicals in the Shuowenjiezi. For one example, the "door radical" 門 (which is generally used to write words semantically related to "doors") is seen in the sequence kāi 開 "open", bì 閉 "close", mén 門 "door", and lǘ 閭 "town" all fall under the heading of, for their meanings are all related to the concept of "door". For another, "sickness radical" 疒 (seen in many characters denoting "illness; sickness") is seen in all but one of the series bìng 病 "illness", kuáng 狂 (with the "dog radical" 犭) "madness", cī 疵 "blemish", gāng 疕 "head sores", chèn 疢 "fever", and yáng 瘍 "sore". In addition, some Cangjiepian passages explain semantic extensions and polysemy, such as "措 means 置 "to handle", also 安 "arrange", and also 施 "implement".

The original Cangjiepian did not have explanatory notes for difficult characters and words, but some received editions have interpretations and glosses added to characters, which are obviously accretions from scholars of later periods. The Tang dynasty dictionary by Xuan Ying (玄應), the Yiqie jing yinyi "Pronunciation and Meaning in the Tripitaka" quotes the Cangjiepian to say, 痏創也 音如鮪魚之鮪, "Wěi 痏 [also pronounced yáng or yòu] means chuàng 創 "wound", and is pronounced like the fish wěi 鮪 "sturgeon"."
