= Leiden Glossary =

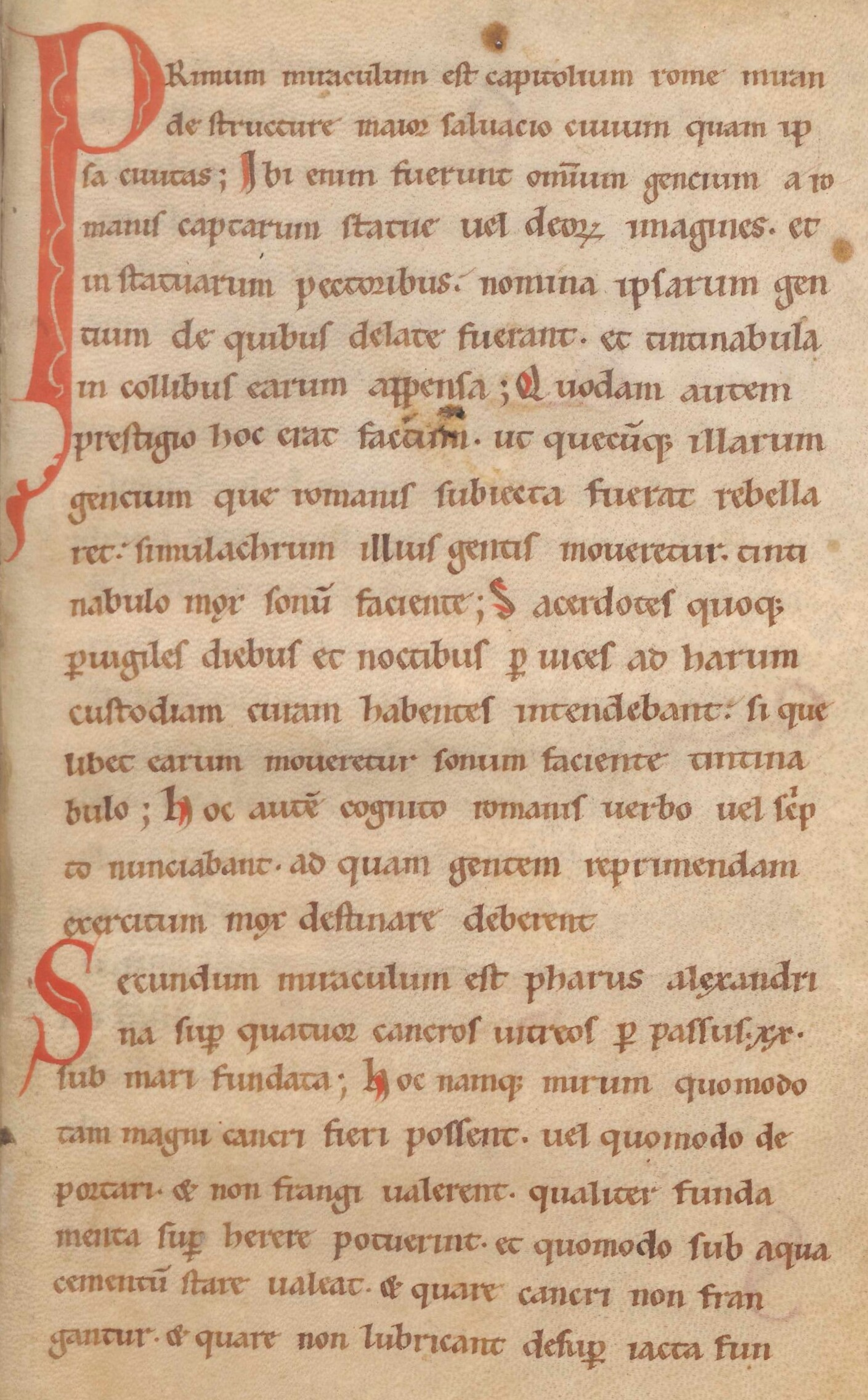
Latin text De septem mundi miraculis, Leiden MS Voss. Lat. Q. 69, around 800. The Seven World Wonders. "Primum miraculum est capitolium rome..."

The Leiden Glossary is a glossary contained in a manuscript in Leiden University Library in the Netherlands, Voss. Lat. Q. 69. The lemmata (headwords) come from "a range of biblical, grammatical, and patristic texts". It is based on an Anglo-Saxon exemplar, and was prepared c. 800 in the Abbey of Saint Gall in modern-day Switzerland.

The glossary contains 48 chapters or glossae collectae, which explain terms from texts used in the classroom by Theodore of Tarsus and Adrian of Canterbury, who both taught at St Augustine's Abbey in Canterbury, and thus "contain the record of their classroom teaching". Most of the glosses are in Latin, though 250 of them are in Old English. They give evidence of the impressive holdings of the Canterbury library (none of which remains) and the reading interests of Anglo-Saxon churchmen.

== Contents ==
Of the 48 glossae collectae, 19 are on lemmata from Bible books, the 23 others from late antique and patristic texts. The importance of a glossary lies partly in that they indicate what was held in the library where the glossary is prepared, partly in what they suggest the glossator's interests were. For instance, Theodore's interest in the works of Pope Gregory I is clear from the distribution of the glosses: there are eight glosses on Gregory's Pastoral Care and no fewer than 46 (or 49) from his Dialogi. In turn, the numerous glosses from the Dialogi, much of which is concerned with hagiographical accounts, prove the importance attached by the Canterbury school to hagiography.

A particular group concerns glosses on Rufinus's translation of Eusebius's Historia Ecclesiastica, where the glossary preserves three groups of lemmata glossed by three different people, "as if they represented the individual responses of three students, of somewhat differing abilities, to the teacher's explanation of the text."

== Provenance ==
That the St Gall copy derives from an exemplar brought to the continent from England is proven by the Anglo-Saxon glosses as well as by other content: the glosses are consistent with other biblical commentary produced by the Canterbury school. In addition, the Rufinus glosses agree with those found in the so-called P manuscript of Eusebius (BAV, Pal. lat. 822), written in Lorsch Abbey (in modern-day Germany) c. 800. The third Rufinus glossator evidently had an interest in Greek not shared by the other two, and Michael Lapidge finds that one lemma and its gloss are echoed in Aldhelm's De virginitate; Lapidge proposed that the third Rufinus glossator may well have been Aldhelm. The Lorsch manuscript, Lapidge argues, is most likely a copy of the manuscript used and annotated in the Canterbury school, the exemplar also for Leiden Voss. Lat. Q. 69.

== Scholarship and editions ==
An edition of the glosses was published in 1901 by Plazidus Glogger, with commentary published in 1903, and in 1906 Jan Hendrik Hessels published another. In the small world of philology, such an almost simultaneous publication is rare. In a note to his own edition, Hessels explains that he became aware of Glogger's edition as he was finishing up his own work, and then only by chance (he saw a note in the MS listing which scholars had worked on it); Glogger had sent Hessels a copy of his book in 1902 but it was delivered at the wrong college and never forwarded. In his note, Hessels says that Glogger had offered to destroy his own publication, which Hessels argued against, and in turn explains that he cannot, given the circumstances, criticize Glogger's work which at any rate was helpful to him and of the highest quality.

== The 'Leiden family' of glossaries ==
The Leiden Glossary has given its name to a large group of medieval Continental glossaries that derive material from the same body of glosses as found in the Leiden Glossary. Many of these have not yet been edited. Michael Lapidge has listed the following manuscripts as belonging to the Leiden Family:

classmark	origin	folios	notes
Berlin (West), Staatsbibliothek der Stiftung Preußischer Kulturbesitz, Grimm 132, 2 and 139, 2	? English centre on the Continent, mid-C8		
Berlin (West), Staatsbibliothek der Stiftung Preußischer Kulturbesitz, Lat. qu. 676	Reichenau, earlier C9	fols. 2 and 3 (binding fragments)	Destroyed 1945
Bern, Burgerbibliothek 258, fols. 1-47	Fleury, C9/10	13v—16v	
Cambridge, University Library, Kk. 4. 6	Worcester, earlier C12	41 r-44v	
Einsiedeln, Stiftsbibliothek 32	Bodensee area, mid-C10	pp. 189–92 and 203-5	
Fulda, Hessische Landesbibliothek Aa. 2	Konstanz, C10, provenance Weingarten	129v-139r	
Karlsruhe, Badische Landesbibliothek, Aug. IC, fols. 37-52	Reichenau, late C8	37r-52v	
Karlsruhe, Badische Landesbibliothek, Aug. CXXXV, fols. 1-105	Reichenau, early C10	96v and 97v-105v	
Leiden, Universiteitsbibliotheek, B.P.L. 191	C14	108r-125	
Leiden, Universiteitsbibliotheek, Voss. lat. F. 24	Western Francia, C9/10	102v-105v	
Leiden, Universiteitsbibliotheek, Voss. lat. Q. 69, fols. 7-47	St Gallen, C8/9	20r-36r	The Leiden Glossary
Milan, Biblioteca Ambrosiana M. 79 sup.	N. Italy, earlier C11	59v-66r, 67v-91r and 124v-126(bis)r	
Munich, Staatsbibliothek, Clm. 6408	? N. Italy, early C10, provenance Freising, C12	47v-48r	
Münster, Universitatsbibliothek, Paulinianus 271 (719) Werden, Pfarrarchiv, 'Werden A'	Werden, earlier C9	fols. 1 and 6 1 leaf only	The Münster leaves were destroyed in 1945
Paris, Bibliothèque Nationale, lat. 2685	Belgium or Holland, later C9	47r-56r	
Saint-Omer, Bibliothèque municipale 150	Saint-Bertin, C10	74r-76r	
St Gallen, Stiftsbibliothek 9	St Gallen, C9	pp. 264–31	
St Gallen, Stiftsbibliothek 295	St Gallen, C9/10	pp. 115–240	
St Gallen, Stiftsbibliothek 299	St Gallen, later C9	pp. 3–23 and 260-91	
St Gallen, Stiftsbibliothek 913, pp. 3–148	Anglo-Saxon mission area, later C8	pp. 159–45	
St Paul im Lavanttal, Stiftsbibliothek 82/1 (plim XXV. d. 82)	Augsburg, C10		
Selestat, Bibliotheque municipale 7 (100)	? Reichenau, early C12	66r-95r	
Stuttgart, Wurttembergische Landesbibliothek, Cod. Theol. et Phil. F. 218, fols. 1-51	Zweifalten, C12		
Trier, Bibliothek des Priesterseminars 61	Trier, C11/12	102v-110v	
Vienna, Nationalbibliothek lat. 1761	Mondsee, C10	1r-63r	
Würzburg, Universitätsbibliothek M. p. th. f. 38	Würzburg, earlier C9	123v-124v	
Würzburg, Universitätsbibliothek M. p. th. f. 47	Anglo-Saxon mission area, early C9	71v-73v	
