= Shizhoupian =

Ancient Chinese dictionary

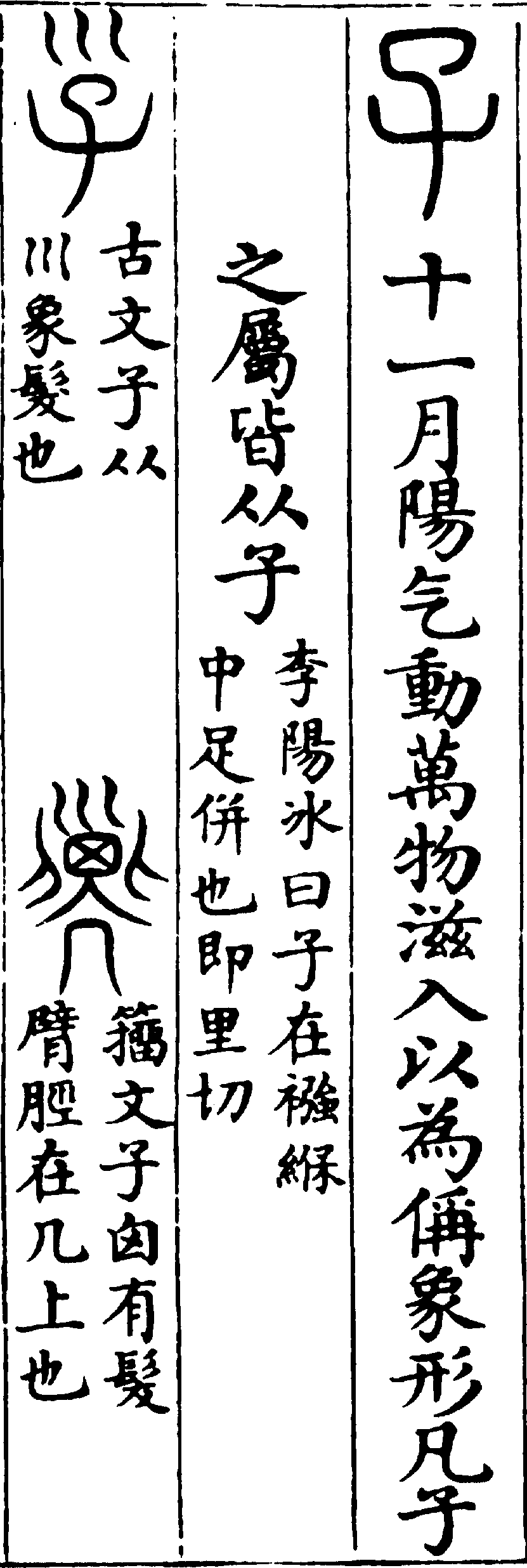
The Shuowen Jiezi entry for 子 'child', showing the small seal script (top right), ancient script (top left), and Zhou script (bottom left) forms.

A page from a commentary on the work by Wang Guowei

The Shizhoupian (Chinese: 史籀篇) is the first known Chinese dictionary, and was written in the ancient large seal script. The work was traditionally dated to the reign of King Xuan of Zhou (827–782 BCE), but many modern scholars assign it to the state of Qin in the Warring States period (c. 475 – 221 BCE). The text is no longer fully extant, and it is now known only through fragments.

== History ==
The Shizhoupian dictionary, which was probably compiled sometime between 700 BCE to 200 BCE, originally consisted of 15 chapters (篇 piān), but six were lost by the reign of Emperor Guangwu of Han (25–56 CE) and the other nine chapters, except for scattered references, were lost by the Jin dynasty (266–420).

== Title ==
Until recently, it was thought that the dictionary title referred to Shi Zhou (史籀, who allegedly served as Grand Historian in the court of Western Zhou King Xuan (r. 827–782 BCE). Both the c. 78 CE "Yiwenzhi" chapter of the Book of Han and the 121 CE Shuowen Jiezi postface record that King Xuan's historian Zhou compiled the Shizhoupian.

The philologist Wang Guowei (1877–1927) disputed this traditional account with epigraphical evidence that the structure and style of the Shizhoupian characters did not match inscriptions from the Western Zhou period. Wang also doubted that zhòu (籀) was a person's surname, interpreting it to mean 讀 'to study and understand the meaning of books', 'to read', and concluded the dictionary title was likely taken from the first sentence Taishi zhoushu (太史籀書, "the Grand Historian reads the records").

The linguist Tang Lan (唐蘭; 1901–1979) hypothetically identified Shi Zhou (史籀), who is only recorded in Shizhoupian contexts, with the differently named Shi Liu (史留) listed in the Book of Han chapter on "Notable Persons Past and Present". In the Zhengzhang system of Old Chinese reconstructions these two words were pronounced *l'ɯwɢs (籀) and *m·ru (劉). An ancient ding tripodal cauldron in the collection of the Shanghai Museum mentioned a Historian Liu from the correct historical period.

Modern scholars believe that zhou (籀) does not refer to a person, but means 'read' or 'chant'. The lexicographer Liu Yeqiu (劉叶秋) suggested that the word shi (史) may refer to the title given to students in ancient times who could recite 9,000 characters, with the title thus translated as "Shi (Reciters') Chants".

== Zhou script ==
The term Zhou script (籀文 zhòuwén) refers to approximately 220 examples of ancient characters from the Shizhoupian that are quoted in the Han dynasty character dictionary Shuowen Jiezi. The Zhou script characters have been described as generally symmetrical and balanced, and are generally more complex than the later seal characters. They contain many swirls and circles in place of later squared or rectilinear forms.

== Sources ==
- Chen Zhaorong (陳昭容) (2003), 秦系文字研究：从漢字史的角度考察 [Research on the Qin Lineage of Writing: An Examination from the Perspective of the History of Chinese Writing] (in Chinese), Academia Sinica, ISBN 957-6-71995-X
- Creamer, Thomas B. I. (1992), "Lexicography and the history of the Chinese language", in Zgusta, Ladislav (ed.), History, Languages, and Lexicographers, Niemeyer, pp. 105–135, ISBN 978-3-484-30941-8
- Galambos, Imre (2006), Orthography of early Chinese writing: evidence from newly excavated manuscripts, Budapest monographs in East Asian Studies, vol. 1, Eötvös Loránd University, ISBN 978-9-634-63811-7
- Qiu Xigui (裘锡圭) (2000) [1988], Chinese Writing, translated by Mattos, Gilbert L.; Norman, Jerry, Berkeley: Society for the Study of Early China and The Institute of East Asian Studies, University of California, ISBN 978-1-557-29071-7
