= Yiwenzhi =

Bibliographical section of the Book of Han

- Traditional Chinese: 藝文志
- Simplified Chinese: 艺文志
- Literal meaning: Monograph on arts and letters
Transcriptions
Standard Mandarin
- Hanyu Pinyin: Yìwén zhì
- Wade–Giles: I^{4}-wen^{2} chih^{4}
- IPA: [î.wə̌n ʈʂɻ̩̂]
Yue: Cantonese
- Yale Romanization: Ngaih-màhn ji
- Jyutping: Ngai6-man4 zi3
- IPA: [ŋɐj˨.mɐn˩ tsi˧]
Southern Min
- Hokkien POJ: Gē-bûn tsì

The "Yiwenzhi", or "Treatise on Literature", is the bibliographical section of the Book of Han authored by the Chinese historian Ban Gu (32–92 AD), who completed the work begun by his father Ban Biao. The bibliographical catalog is the last of its ten treatises, and scroll 30 of the 100 scrolls comprising the Hanshu.

The basis for the catalog came from the "Qilüe" (七略) by Liu Xin (c. 46 BCE – 23 CE), which gives detailed bibliographical information about holdings in the Imperial Library, which itself was an extension on Bielu (別錄) by Liu Xin's father Liu Xiang, on which the two had collaborated. The catalog provides important insights into the literature of the various Chinese intellectual currents of the pre-Qin period (Nine Schools of Thought), of which only some 20% are presently known.

== Origin ==
The "Yiwenzhi" closely adheres to the bibliographical system devised by Liu Xiang and Liu Xin with minor exceptions. The introductory paragraph of the treatise, most likely taken verbatim from Qilue, is quite informative:

"Many books were in great disarray in the time of Chengdi, upon which Chen Nong (陳農) was ordered to collect all the books in the world, and high officials to collate books in the Imperial Library; Luminous Grand Master, Liu Xiang, was put in charge of works by the Confucians, the philosophers, and the shi and fu poets; Lieutenant General of the Shanglin Imperial Garden Garrison, Ren Hong (任宏), of works by militarists, Grand Astronomer-Historian, Yin Xian (尹咸), of works by astrologers and diviners, and Surgeon to the Emperor, Li Zhuguo (李柱國), of works by herbalists and alchemists. Liu Xiang wrote an abstract for each completed work, catalogued, and memorialized it to the emperor. Liu Xin expanded the system to cover a great many books, and memorialized the Seven Abstracts, or the Qilue."

Liu Xin created a seventh domain Jilue (輯略) to separate books he himself wrote, but Ban Gu, while using Liu Xin's Qilue material, reverted to the six-domain system of Liu Xiang, and reclassified Liu Xin's works into the other six domains. Furthermore, Ban Gu added titles that appeared after Qilue (before 23) and before his time of writing the Hanshu (before 92), including some of his own.

== Material and morphology ==
Scrolls in bamboo strips, mostly for text, were referred to as pian (篇), while those in woven silk, mostly for large pictorial representations, as juan (卷); both are called scrolls because they were rolled up, bound, and tagged for identification. The practice of using scroll pouches called ji (帙) to hold five to ten scrolls had been in existence (Shuowen Jiezi defines the character as "book clothes"), but paper had not been invented by Cai Lun until 13 years after Ban Gu's death. The earliest form of back-bone binding of books, the butterfly binding (蝴蝶裝), was not invented until around 1000.

== Contents ==
Contents of the Hanshu Yiwenzhi
The Six Domains (略)	Class (種)	Family (家)	Scrolls (篇, 卷)
The Confucians (六藝略)	9	103	3,123
The Philosophers (諸子略)	10	189	4,324
Shi and Fu Poets (詩賦略)	5	106	1,318
The Militarists (兵書略)	4	53	833
Astrologers and Diviners (術數略)	6	190	2,528
Herbalists and Alchemists (方技略)	4	36	868

== Research ==
Commentaries on "Yiwenzhi" were done by Yan Shigu (581–645) and Wang Yinglin (王應麟; 1223–1296). Modern researchers on the topic include Gu Shi (顾实), Chen Guoqing and others.

== Comparison to the Pinake of Alexandria ==
The Hanshu Yiwenzhi catalogued the Former Han Imperial Library holdings under "6 domains, 38 classes, 596 families; 13,269 scrolls in all" (大凡書，六略三十八種，五百九十六家，萬三千二百六十九卷。) concludes the treatise. An estimated 20% of the titles are extant today. This compares favourably with the estimated 10% survival of the Pinakes titles that consisted of works in Greek, Egyptian, Aramaic, Hebrew, Persian, and other languages, in the Great Library of Alexandria of the 3rd century BCE, which according to one tradition, at one time held some 120,000 parchment scrolls and papyri.
