= Chinese character sets =

A Chinese character set (simplified Chinese: 汉字字符集; traditional Chinese: 中文字元集; pinyin: hànzì zìfú jí) is a group of Chinese characters.

There are different Chinese character sets for different purposes. The following is an introduction to some representative character sets in history, in modern languages and in information technology.

== Dictionaries and lexicon ==
Along with the development of writing systems, the number of Chinese characters kept growing, as shown by the character sets of the dictionaries. The total number of characters that have been created reaches well into the hundreds of thousands if variants are considered. The orthography used by these dictionaries are largely considered jiu zixing.

Number of characters in monolingual Chinese dictionaries
Year	Dict.	Char.
300 BC	Erya	4300
100 AD	Shuowen Jiezi	9516
230	Shenglei	11520
350	Zilin	12824
543	Yupian	16917
601	Qieyun	12150
732	Tangyun	15000
753	Yunhai jingyuan	26911
997	Longkan Shoujian	26430
1011	Guangyun	26194
1039	Jiyun	53525
1066	Leipian	31319
1615	Zihui	33179
1675	Zhengzitong	33440
1716	Kangxi Dictionary	46933
1915	Zhonghua Da Zidian	48200
1968	Zhongwen Da Cidian	49888
1989	Hanyu Da Zidian	54678
1994	Zhonghua Zihai	85568
2017	Dictionary of Chinese Character Variants	106330

Number of characters in bilingual Chinese dictionaries
Year	Dictionary	Language	Char.
2003	ABC Chinese–English Comprehensive Dictionary	English	9638 (Note: Heading characters of 196,373 word entries)
2003	Dai Kan-Wa Jiten	Japanese	50305
2008	Han-Han Dae Sajeon	Korean	53667

== Modern standards ==
Due to the dynamic development of languages, there is no definite number of modern Chinese characters. However a reasonable estimation can be made by a survey of the character sets of relevant standard lists and influential dictionaries in the countries and regions where Chinese characters are used.

Polity	Standard	Char.	Date
China	General List of Simplified Chinese Characters	2235	1964
China	List of Commonly Used Characters in Modern Chinese	7000	1988
China	List of Commonly Used Standard Chinese Characters	8105	2013
Hong Kong	List of Graphemes of Commonly-Used Chinese Characters (Note: Reference for education)	4762	2012
Hong Kong	Reference Glyphs for Chinese Computer Systems in Hong Kong (Note: Reference for font foundries)	—N/a	2016
Taiwan	Chart of Standard Forms of Common National Characters	4808	1982
Taiwan	Chart of Standard Forms of Less-Than-Common National Characters	6341	1983
Taiwan	Chart of Rarely-Used National Characters	18388	2017
Japan	Tōyō kanji	1850	1946
Japan	Jōyō kanji	2136	2010
South Korea	Basic Hanja for Educational Use	1800	2000

=== Mainland China ===
The important standards in the People's Republic of China include List of Frequently Used Characters in Modern Chinese (现代汉语常用字表, of 3,500 characters), and the List of Commonly Used Characters in Modern Chinese (现代汉语通用字表 with 7,000 characters, including the 3,500 characters in the previous list). But the current standard is the List of Commonly Used Standard Chinese Characters, which was released by the State Council in June 2013 to replace the previous two lists and some other standards. It includes 8,105 characters of the Simplified Chinese writing system, 3,500 as primary, 3,000 as secondary, and 1,605 as tertiary. In addition, there are 2,574 Traditional characters and 1,023 variants.

From 1990 to 1991, the National Leading Group for Teaching Chinese as a Foreign Language and the Chinese Proficiency Test Center of Beijing Language Institute jointly developed the "汉语水平词汇与汉字等级大纲" (Outline of the Graded Vocabulary and Characters for HSK). The Chinese character outline contains 2,905 characters, divided into four grades: 800 Grade A characters, 804 Grade B characters, 601 Grade C characters, and 700 Grade D characters.

The most popular modern Chinese character dictionary and word dictionary are Xinhua Zidian and Xiandai Hanyu Cidian. They each includes over 13,000 characters of Simplified characters, Traditional characters and some variants.

=== Taiwan ===
In Taiwan, there are the Chart of Standard Forms of Common National Characters (常用國字標準字體表) with 4,808 characters, and the Chart of Standard Forms of Less-Than-Common National Characters (次常用國字標準字體表), with 6,341 common national characters. Both lists were released by the Ministry of Education, with a total of 11,149 characters of the Traditional Chinese writing system.

=== Hong Kong ===
In Hong Kong, there is the List of Graphemes of Commonly-Used Chinese Characters for elementary and junior secondary education, totally 4,762 characters. This list was released by the Education Bureau, and is very influential in the educational circles.

=== Japan ===
In Japan, there are the jōyō kanji (frequently used Chinese characters, designated by the Japanese Ministry of Education, including 2,136 characters) and jinmeiyō kanji (for use in personal names, currently including 983 characters).

=== Korea ===
In Korea, there are the Basic Hanja for educational use (漢文敎育用基礎漢字, a subset of 1,800 Hanja defined in 1972 by a South Korea educational standard), and the Table of Hanja for Personal Name Use (人名用追加漢字表), published by the Supreme Court of Korea in March 1991. The list expanded gradually, and to year 2015 there were 8,142 hanja permitted to be used in Korean names.

=== Overall estimates ===
With consideration of all the character sets mentioned above, the total number of modern Chinese characters in the world is over 10,000, probably around 15,000. Such an estimation should not be counted as too rough, considering that there are totally over 100,000 Chinese characters, as mentioned above.

A college graduate who is literate in written Chinese knows between three and four thousand characters. Specialists in classical literature or history, who would often encounter characters no longer in use, are estimated to have a working vocabulary of between 5,000 and 6,000 characters.

== Information technology ==
The following sections will introduce the Chinese character sets of some encoding standards used in information technology, including GB, Big5 and Unicode.

=== Guobiao ===
GB stands for Guobiao (‘national standard’), and is the prefix for reference numbers of official standards issued by the People's Republic of China.

The first GB Chinese character encoding standard is GB 2312, which was released in 1980. It includes 6,763 Chinese characters, with 3,755 frequently used ones sorted by pinyin, and the rest by radicals (indexing components). GB 2312 was designed for simplified characters. Traditional characters which have been simplified are not covered. GB 2312 is still in use on some computers and the web, though newer versions with extended character sets, such as GB 13000.1 and GB 18030, have been released. The latest version of GB encoding is GB 18030. It supports both simplified and traditional Chinese characters, and is consistent with Unicode's character set.

=== Big5 ===
Big5 encoding was designed by five big IT companies in Taiwan in the early 1980s, and has been the de facto standard for representing traditional Chinese in computers ever since. Big5 is popularly used in Taiwan, Hong Kong and Macau. The original Big5 standard included 13,053 Chinese characters, with no simplified characters of the Mainland. Chinese characters in the Big5 character set are arranged in radical order. Extended versions of Big5 include Big-5E and Big5-2003, which include some simplified characters and Hong Kong Cantonese characters.

=== Unicode ===
Unicode is the most influential international standard for multilingual character encoding. It is consistent with (or virtually equivalent to) standard ISO/IEC10646. The full version of Unicode represents a character with a 4-byte digital code, providing a huge encoding space to cover all characters of all languages in the world. The Basic Multilingual Plane (BMP) is a 2-byte kernel version of Unicode with 2^16=65,536 code points for important characters of many languages. There are 27,522 characters in the CJKV (China, Japan, Korea and Vietnam) Ideographs Area, including all the simplified and traditional Chinese characters in GB2312 and Big5 traditional.

In Unicode 15.0, there is a multilingual character set of 149,813 characters, among which 98,682 (about 2/3) are Chinese characters sorted by Kangxi Radicals. Even very rarely used characters are available.

All the 5,009 characters of the Hong Kong Supplementary Character Set (HKSCS) are included in Unicode. HKSCS was developed by the Hong Kong government as a collection of locally specific Chinese characters not available on the computer in the early days.

Unicode is becoming more and more popular. It is reported that UTF-8 (Unicode) is used by 98.1% of all the websites. It is widely believed that Unicode will ultimately replace all other information interchange codes and internal codes for digital devices.

== See also ==
- Modern Chinese characters
