= Chinese dictionary =

A page from the Yiqiejing yinyi, the oldest extant Chinese dictionary of Buddhist technical terminology – Dunhuang manuscripts, c. 8th century

There are two types of dictionaries regularly used in the Chinese language: 'character dictionaries' (字典; zìdiǎn) list individual Chinese characters, and 'word dictionaries' (辞典; 辭典; cídiǎn) list words and phrases. Because tens of thousands of characters have been used in written Chinese, Chinese lexicographers have developed a number of methods to order and sort characters to facilitate more convenient reference.

Chinese dictionaries have been published for over two millennia, beginning in the Han dynasty. This is the longest lexicographical history of any language. In addition to works for standard Chinese, beginning with the 1st-century CE Fangyan dictionaries also been created for the many varieties of Chinese. One of the most influential Chinese dictionaries ever published was the Kangxi Dictionary, finished in 1716 during the Qing dynasty, with the list of 214 Kangxi radicals it popularized are still widely used.

== Terminology ==
The general term cishu (Chinese: 辭書; pinyin: císhū; lit. 'lexicographic books') semantically encompasses "dictionary; lexicon; encyclopedia; glossary". The Chinese language has two words for dictionary: zidian (character dictionary) for written forms, that is, Chinese characters, and cidian (word/phrase dictionary), for spoken forms.

For character dictionaries, zidian (Chinese: 字典; pinyin: zìdiǎn; Wade–Giles: tzŭ⁴-tien³; lit. 'character dictionary') combines zi (字; "character, graph; letter, script, writing; word") and dian (典 "dictionary, encyclopedia; standard, rule; statute, canon; classical allusion").

For word dictionaries, cidian is interchangeably written (辭典/辞典; cídiǎn; tzʻŭ²-tien³; "word dictionary") or (詞典/词典; cídiǎn; tzʻŭ²-tien³; "word dictionary"); using cí (辭; "word, speech; phrase, expression; diction, phraseology; statement; a kind of poetic prose; depart; decline; resign"), and its graphic variant cí (詞; "word, term; expression, phrase; speech, statement; part of speech; a kind of tonal poetry"). Zidian is a much older and more common word than cidian, and Yang notes zidian is often "used for both 'character dictionary' and 'word dictionary'.

== Traditional Chinese lexicography ==
The precursors of Chinese dictionaries are primers designed for students of Chinese characters. The earliest of them only survive in fragments or quotations within Chinese classic texts. For example, the Shizhoupian was compiled by one or more historians in the court of King Xuan of Zhou (r. 827 BCE – 782 BCE), and was the source of the 籀文 zhòuwén variant forms listed in the Han dynasty Shuowen Jiezi dictionary. The Cangjiepian ("Chapters of Cang Jie"), named after the legendary inventor of writing, was edited by Li Si, and helped to standardize the Small seal script during the Qin dynasty.

The collation or lexicographical ordering of a dictionary generally depends upon its writing system. For a language written in an alphabet or syllabary, dictionaries are usually ordered alphabetically. Samuel Johnson defined dictionary as "a book containing the words of any language in alphabetical order, with explanations of their meaning" in his dictionary. But Johnson's definition cannot be applied to the Chinese dictionaries, as Chinese is written in characters or logograph, not alphabets. To Johnson, not having an alphabet is not to the Chinese's credit, as in 1778, when James Boswell asked about the Chinese characters, he replied "Sir, they have not an alphabet. They have not been able to form what all other nations have formed". Nevertheless, the Chinese made their dictionaries, and developed three original systems for lexicographical ordering: semantic categories, graphic components, and pronunciations.

=== Semantically organized dictionaries ===
The first system of dictionary organization is by semantic categories. The circa 3rd-century BCE Erya ("Approaching Correctness") is the oldest extant Chinese dictionary, and scholarship reveals that it is a pre-Qin compilation of glosses to classical texts. It contains lists of synonyms arranged into 19 semantic categories (e.g., "Explaining Plants", "Explaining Trees"). The Han dynasty dictionary Xiao Erya ("Little Erya") reduces these 19 to 13 chapters. The early 3rd century CE Guangya ("Expanded Erya"), from the Northern Wei dynasty, followed the Erya's original 19 chapters. The circa 1080 CE Piya ("Increased Erya"), from the Song dynasty, has 8 semantically based chapters of names for plants and animals. For a dictionary user wanting to look up a character, this arbitrary semantic system is inefficient unless one already knows, or can guess, the meaning.

Two other Han dynasty lexicons are loosely organized by semantics. The 1st century CE Fangyan ("Regional Speech") is the world's oldest known dialectal dictionary. The circa 200 CE Shiming ("Explaining Names") employs paranomastic glosses to define words.

=== Graphically organized dictionaries ===
The second system of dictionary organization is by recurring graphic components or radicals. The famous 100–121 CE Shuowen Jiezi ("Explaining Simple and Analyzing Compound Characters") arranged characters through a system of 540 bushou (部首; "section header") radicals. The 543 CE Yupian ("Jade Chapters"), from the Liang dynasty, rearranged them into 542. The 1615 CE Zihui ("Character Glossary"), edited by Mei Yingzuo during the Ming dynasty, simplified the 540 Shuowen Jiezi radicals to 214. It also originated the "radical-stroke" scheme of ordering characters on the number of residual graphic strokes besides the radical. The 1627 Zhengzitong ("Correct Character Mastery") also used 214. The 1716 CE Kangxi Dictionary, compiled under the Kangxi Emperor of the Qing dynasty, became the standard dictionary for Chinese characters, and popularized the system of 214 radicals. As most Chinese characters are semantic-phonetic ones (形聲字), the radical method is usually effective, thus it continues to be widely used in the present day. However, sometimes the radical of a character is not obvious. To compensate this, a "Chart of Characters that Are Difficult to Look up" (難檢字表), arranged by the number of strokes of the characters, is usually provided.

=== Phonetically organized dictionaries ===
The third system of lexicographical ordering is by character pronunciation. This type of dictionary collates its entries by syllable rime and tones, and produces a so-called "rime dictionary". The first surviving rime dictionary is the 601 CE Qieyun ("Cutting [Spelling] Rimes") from the Sui dynasty; it became the standard of pronunciation for Middle Chinese. During the Song dynasty, it was expanded into the 1011 CE Guangyun ("Expanded Rimes") and the 1037 CE Jiyun ("Collected Rimes").

The clear problem with these old phonetically arranged dictionary is that the would-be user needs to have the knowledge of rime. Thus, dictionaries collated this way can only serve the literati.

A great number of modern dictionaries published today arrange their entries by pinyin or other methods of romanisation, together with a radicals index. Some of these pinyin dictionaries also contain indices of the characters arranged by number and order of strokes, by the four corner encoding or by the cangjie encoding.

Some dictionaries employ more than one of these three methods of collation. For example, the Longkan Shoujian of the Liao dynasty uses radicals, which are grouped by tone. The characters under each radical are also grouped by tone.

=== Functional classifications ===
Besides categorizing ancient Chinese dictionaries by their methods of collation, they can also be classified by their functions. In the traditional bibliographic divisions of the imperial collection Complete Library of the Four Treasuries , dictionaries were classified as belonging to xiǎoxué (小學, lit. "minor learning", the premodern equivalent of "linguistics"), which was contrasted with dàxué (大學, "major learning", i.e., learning that had moral implications). Xiaoxue was divided into texts dealing with xùngǔ (訓詁, "exegesis" similar to "philology"), wénzì (文字, "script", analogous to "grammatology"), and yīnyùn (音韻, "sounds and rhymes," comparable to "phonology").

The Xungu type, sometimes called yǎshū (雅書, "word book"), comprises Erya and its descendants. These exegetical dictionaries focus on explaining meanings of words as found in the Chinese classics.

The Wenzi dictionaries, called zìshū (字書 "character book"), consist of Shuowen Jiezi, Yupian, Zihui, Zhengzitong, and the Kangxi Dictionary. This type of dictionary, which focuses on the shape and structure of the characters, subsumes both "orthography dictionaries", such as the Ganlu Zishu (干祿字書) of the Tang dynasty, and "script dictionaries", such as the Liyun (隸韻) of the Song dynasty. Although these dictionaries center upon the graphic properties of Chinese characters, they do not necessarily collate characters by radical. For instance, Liyun is a clerical script dictionary collated by tone and rime.

The Yinyun type, called yùnshū (韻書 "rime book"), focuses on the pronunciations of characters. These dictionaries are always collated by rimes.

While the above traditional pre-20th-century Chinese dictionaries focused upon the meanings and pronunciations of words in classical texts, they practically ignored the spoken language and vernacular literature.

== Modern Chinese lexicography ==
The Kangxi Dictionary served as the standard Chinese dictionary for generations, is still published and is now online. Contemporary lexicography is divisible between bilingual and monolingual Chinese dictionaries.

=== Chinese–English dictionaries ===
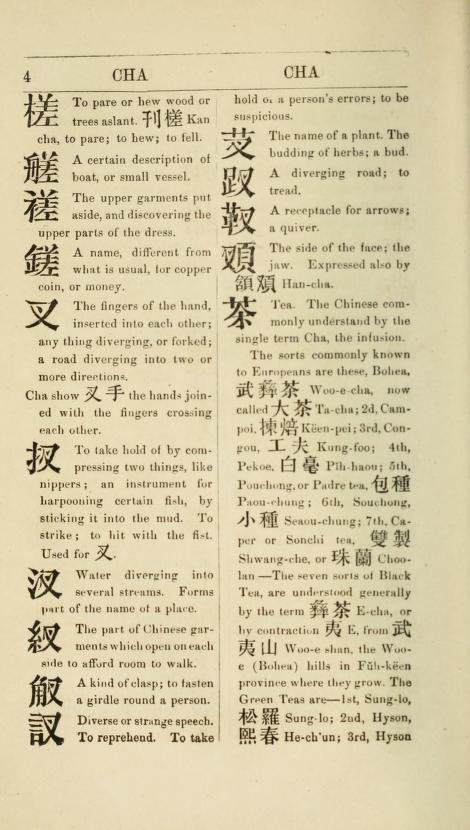
A page from the 1865 reprint of Morrison's Chinese dictionary, the first major Chinese–English dictionary. In this section, words are arranged alphabetically based on Morrison's transcription of Chinese.

The foreigners who entered China in late Ming and Qing dynasties needed dictionaries for different purposes than native speakers. Wanting to learn Chinese, they compiled the first grammar books and bilingual dictionaries. Westerners adapted the Latin alphabet to represent Chinese pronunciation, and arranged their dictionaries accordingly.

Two Bible translators edited early Chinese dictionaries. The Scottish missionary Robert Morrison wrote A Dictionary of the Chinese Language (1815–1823). The British missionary Walter Henry Medhurst wrote a Hokkien (Min Nan) dialect dictionary in 1832 and the Chinese and English Dictionary in 1842. Both were flawed in their representation of pronunciations, such as aspirated stops. In 1874 the American philologist and diplomat Samuel Wells Williams applied the method of dialect comparison in his dictionary, A Syllabic Dictionary of the Chinese Language, which refined distinctions in articulation and gave variant regional pronunciations in addition to standard Beijing pronunciation.

The British consular officer and linguist Herbert Giles criticized Williams as "the lexicographer not for the future but of the past", and took nearly twenty years to compile his A Chinese-English Dictionary (1892, 1912), one that Norman calls "the first truly adequate Chinese–English dictionary". It contained 13,848 characters and numerous compound expressions, with pronunciation based upon Beijing Mandarin, which it compared with nine southern dialects such as Cantonese, Hakka, and Fuzhou dialect. It has been called "still interesting as a repository of late Qing documentary Chinese, although there is little or no indication of the citations, mainly from the Kangxi Zidian [Kangxi Dictionary]." Giles modified the Chinese romanization system of Thomas Francis Wade to create the Wade-Giles system, which was standard in English speaking countries until 1979 when pinyin was adopted. The Giles dictionary was replaced by the 1931 dictionary of the Australian missionary Robert Henry Mathews. Mathews' Chinese-English Dictionary, which was popular for decades, was based on Giles and partially updated by Y.R. Chao in 1943 and reprinted in 1960.

Trained in American structural linguistics, Yuen Ren Chao and Lien-sheng Yang wrote a Concise Dictionary of Spoken Chinese (1947), that emphasized the spoken rather than the written language. Main entries were listed in Gwoyeu Romatzyh, and they distinguished free morphemes from bound morphemes. A hint of non-standard pronunciation was also given, by marking final stops and initial voicing and non-palatalization in non-Mandarin dialects.

The Swedish sinologist Bernhard Karlgren wrote the seminal (1957) Grammata Serica Recensa with his reconstructed pronunciations for Middle Chinese and Old Chinese.

Chinese lexicography advanced during the 1970s. The translator Lin Yutang wrote the semantically sophisticated Lin Yutang's Chinese-English Dictionary of Modern Usage (1972) that is now available online. The author Liang Shih-Chiu edited two full-scale dictionaries: Chinese-English with over 8,000 characters and 100,000 entries, and English-Chinese with over 160,000 entries.

The linguist and professor of Chinese John DeFrancis edited the ABC Chinese–English Dictionary (1996), giving more than 196,000 words or terms alphabetically arranged in a single-tier pinyin order. The user can therefore in a straightforward way find a term whose pronunciation is known rather than searching by radical or character structure, the latter being a 2-tiered approach. This project had long been advocated by another pinyin proponent, Victor H. Mair.

=== Chinese–Chinese dictionaries ===
When the Republic of China began in 1912, educators and scholars recognized the need to update the 1716 Kangxi Dictionary. It was thoroughly revised in the (1915) Zhonghua Da Zidian ("Comprehensive Chinese-Character Dictionary"), which corrected over 4,000 Kangxi Dictionary mistakes and added more than 1,000 new characters. Lu Erkui's (1915) Ciyuan ("Sources of Words") was a groundbreaking effort in Chinese lexicography and can be considered the first cidian "word dictionary".

Shu Xincheng's (1936) Cihai ("Sea of Words") was a comprehensive dictionary of characters and expressions, and provided near-encyclopedic coverage in fields like science, philosophy, history. The Cihai remains a popular dictionary and has been frequently revised.

The (1937) Guoyu cidian (國語辭典 "Dictionary of the National Language") was a four-volume dictionary of words, designed to standardize modern pronunciation. The main entries were characters listed phonologically by Zhuyin Fuhao and Gwoyeu Romatzyh. For example, the title in these systems is ㄍㄨㄛㄩ ㄘㄉ一ㄢ and Gwoyeu tsyrdean.

Wei Jiangong's (1953) Xinhua Zidian ("New China Character Dictionary") is a pocket-sized reference, alphabetically arranged by pinyin. It is the world's most popular reference work. The 11th edition was published in 2011.

Lü Shuxiang's (1973) Xiandai Hanyu Cidian ("Contemporary Chinese Dictionary") is a middle-sized dictionary of words. It is arranged by characters, alphabetized by pinyin, which list compounds and phrases, with a total 56,000 entries (expanded to 70,000 in the 2016 edition). Both the Xinhua zidian and the Xiandai Hanyu cidian followed a simplified scheme of 189 radicals.

Two outstanding achievements in contemporary Chinese lexicography are the (1986–93) Hanyu Da Cidian ("Comprehensive Dictionary of Chinese Words") with over 370,000 word and phrase entries listed under 23,000 different characters; and the (1986–89) Hanyu Da Zidian ("Comprehensive Dictionary of Chinese Characters") with 54,678 head entries for characters. They both use a system of 200 radicals.

In recent years, the computerization of Chinese has allowed lexicographers to create dianzi cidian (電子詞典/电子词典 "electronic dictionaries") usable on computers, PDAs, etc. There are proprietary systems, such as Wenlin Software for learning Chinese, and there are also free dictionaries available online. After Paul Denisowski started the volunteer CEDICT (Chinese–English dictionary) project in 1997, it has grown into a standard reference database. The CEDICT is the basis for many Internet dictionaries of Chinese, and is included in the Unihan Database.

== Specialized dictionaries ==
Chinese publishing houses print diverse types of zhuanke cidian (專科詞典/专科词典 "specialized dictionary"). One Chinese dictionary bibliography lists over 130 subject categories, from "Abbreviations, Accounting" to "Veterinary, Zoology." The following examples are limited to specialized dictionaries from a few representative fields.

=== Ancient Chinese ===
Dictionaries of Ancient Chinese give definitions, in Modern Chinese, of characters and words found in the pre-Modern (before 1911) Chinese literature. They are typically organized by pinyin or by Zihui radicals, and give definitions in order of antiquity (most ancient to most recent) when several definitions exist. Quotes from the literature exemplifying each listed meaning are given. Quotes are usually chosen from the pre-Han Classical literature when possible, unless the definition emerged during the post-Classical period. Dictionaries intended for historians, linguists, and other classical scholars will sometimes also provide Middle Chinese fanqie readings and/or Old Chinese rime groups, as well as bronze script or oracle bone script forms.

While dictionaries published in mainland China intended for study or reference by high school/college students are generally printed in Simplified Chinese, dictionaries intended for scholarly research are set in Traditional Chinese.

- Gudai Hanyu Cidian (古代汉语词典; Word Dictionary of Ancient Chinese) Beijing: Commercial Press, 1998. (24000 header words) [Simplified Chinese] (This dictionary is the most extensive special purpose ancient Chinese dictionary in terms of the number of words defined. However, general purpose dictionaries like the Hanyu Dacidian, Cihai, and Ciyuan may contain a larger overall ancient Chinese lexicon, together with modern words.)
- Guhanyu Changyongzi Zidian (古汉语常用字字典; Dictionary of Commonly Used Characters in Ancient Chinese) Beijing: Commercial Press, 2006. (6400 header characters) [Simplified Chinese, Traditional Chinese edition also available] (This ancient Chinese dictionary is probably the most popular in terms of sales and is intended for a general audience with a non-expert understanding of the Classical language. It is used extensively as a reference and study aid by secondary school students in preparation for the wenyanwen portion of the Chinese language section of the National College Entrance Examination (gaokao).)
- Wang Li Guhanyu Zidian (王力古漢語字典; The Wang Li Character Dictionary of Ancient Chinese). (12500 header characters) [Traditional Chinese] (This dictionary was compiled over a period of 15 years by a team of well-known linguists and specialists in ancient Chinese literature at Peking University originally led by the late Professor Wang Li. It is authoritative and intended for use by scholars of ancient Chinese language and literature.)

=== Dialects ===
Twenty centuries ago, the Fangyan was the first Chinese specialized dictionary. The usual English translation for fangyan (方言; lit. "regional/areal speech") is "dialect", but the language situation in China is said to be uniquely complex. In the "dialect" sense of English dialects, Chinese has Mandarin dialects, yet fangyan is also used to mean "non-Mandarin languages, mutually unintelligible regional varieties of Chinese", such as Cantonese and Hakka. Some linguists like John DeFrancis prefer the translation "topolect", which are very similar to independent languages. (See also- Protection of the Varieties of Chinese.) The Dictionary of Frequently-Used Taiwan Minnan is an online dictionary of Taiwanese Hokkien. Here are some general fangyan cidian (方言词典; "topolect dictionary") examples.

- Beijing University Chinese Department. Hanyu Fangyin Zihui (汉语方言字汇; "A syllabary of Chinese topolects") Beijing: Wenzi Gaige Chubanshe. 1962.
- Beijing University Chinese Department. Hanyu fangyan cihui (汉语方言词汇; "A lexicon of Chinese topolects"). Beijing: Wenzi Gaige Chubanshe. 1964.
- Xu Baohua (许宝华) and Miyata Ichiro (宮田一郎), eds. Hanyu fangyan da cidian (汉语方言大词典; "A comprehensive dictionary of Chinese topolects"). Beijing: Zhonghua Shuzhu. 1999.
- Zhan Bohui (詹伯慧), ed. Xiandai Hanyu fangyan da cidian (现代汉语方言大词典; "A comprehensive dictionary of modern Chinese topolects"). Qianjiang: Hubei Renmin Chubanshe. 2002.

=== Idioms ===
Chinese has five words translatable as "idiom": chengyu (成語/成语 "set phrase; idiom"), yanyu (諺語/谚语; "proverb; popular saying, maxim; idiom"), xiehouyu (歇後語/歇后语; "truncated witticism, aposiopesis; enigmatic folk simile"), xiyu (習語/习语; "idiom"), and guanyongyu (慣用語/惯用语; "fixed expression; idiom; locution"). Some modern dictionaries for idioms are:

- Li Yihua (李一华) and Lu Deshen (吕德申), eds. Hanyu chengyu cidian (汉语成语词典; "A dictionary of Chinese idioms"). Sichuan Cishu Chubanshe. 1985.
- Wang Qin (王勤), ed. Fenlei Hanyu chengyu da cidian (分类汉语成语大词典; "A comprehensive classified dictionary of Chinese idioms"). Shandong jiaoyu. 1988.
- Li Xingjian (李行健), ed. Xiandai Hanyu chengyu guifan cidian (现代汉语成语规范词典; "A standard dictionary of modern Chinese idioms"). Changqun Chubanshe. 2000.
- Zhang Yipeng (张一鹏), ed. Yanyu da dian (谚语大典; "A Dictionary of Chinese Proverbs). Shanghai: Hanyu dacidian Chubanshe. 2004.
- Wen Duanzheng (温端政). Zhongguo yanyu da quan (中国谚语大全; "An encyclopedia of Chinese proverbs"), 2 vols. Shanghai: Shanghai Cishu. 2004.

=== Loanwords ===
The Chinese language adopted a few foreign wailaici (外來詞/外来词 "loanwords") during the Han dynasty, especially after Zhang Qian's exploration of the Western Regions. The lexicon absorbed many Buddhist terms and concepts when Chinese Buddhism began to flourish in the Southern and Northern dynasties. During the late 19th century, when Western powers forced open China's doors, numerous loanwords entered Chinese, many through the Japanese language. While some foreign borrowings became obsolete, others became indispensable terms in modern vocabulary.

- Cen Qixiang (岑麒祥) ed. Hanyu Wailaiyu Cidian (汉语外来语词典; "Dictionary of Loanwords in Chinese"). Beijing: Commercial Press. 1990.
- Liu Zhengtan (劉正談), et al. eds. Hanyu Wailaici Cidian (漢語外來詞詞典; "Dictionary of Loanwords in Chinese"). Hong Kong: Commercial Press; Shanghai: Shanghai cishu chubanshe. 1985.
- Shi Youwei (史有为), ed. Hanyu wailaici (汉语外来词; "Loanwords in Chinese"). Beijing: Commercial Press. 2000.

=== Vernacular literature ===
The 20th century saw the rapid progress of the studies of the lexicons found in the Chinese vernacular literature, which includes novels, dramas and poetry. Important works in the field include:

- Zhang Xiang (張相), Shiciqu Yuci Huishi (詩詞曲語辭匯釋; "Compilation and Explanations of the Colloquial Terms Found in Classical Poetry and Dramas"). Pioneering work in the field, completed in 1945 but published posthumously in 1954 in Shanghai by Zhonghua Book Company. Many reprints.
- Jiang Lihong (蔣禮鴻), Dunhuang Bianwen Ziyi Tongshi (敦煌變文字義通釋; "A Comprehensive Glossary of the Special Terms Found in the Genre of Dunhuang Bianwen"), revised and enlarged edition with supplements. Shanghai: Shanghai guji chubanshe. 1997. First published 1962.
- Wang Ying (王锳), Shiciqu Yuci Lishi (诗词曲语辞例释; "Explanations of the Colloquial Terms Found in Classical Poetry and Dramas, Illustrated by Examples"), 2nd revised and enlarged edition. Beijing: Zhonghua Book Company. 2005. First published 1980.
- Gu Xuejie (顧學頡) & Wang Xueqi (王學奇), Yuanqu Shici (元曲釋詞; "Explanation of the Special Terms Found in the Yuan Operas"). Beijing: Zhongguo shehui kexue chubanshe. 1983–1990. 4 volumes.
- Wang Ying (王锳), Tangsong Biji Yuci Huishi (唐宋笔记语辞汇释; "Compilation and Explanations of the Colloquial Terms Found in the Biji of the Tang and Song Dynasties"), revised edition. Beijing: Zhonghua Book Company. 2001. First published 1990.
- Wang Ying (王锳), Songyuanming Shiyu Huishi (宋元明市语汇释; "Compilation and Explanations of the Jargon and Slang used in the Song and Yuan Dynasties"). Guiyang: Guizhou renmin chubanshe. 1997.
- Fang Linggui (方龄贵), Gudian Xiqu Wailaiyu Kaoshi Cidian (古典戏曲外來语考释词典; "A Dictionary of Loanwords in Classical Dramas of China"). Shanghai: Hanyu da cidian chubanshe; Kunming: Yunnan daxue chubanshe. 2001. First published in 1991 as Yuanming Xiqu Zhong De Mengguyu (元明戲曲中的蒙古語; "Mongolian Expressions in Yuan and Ming Dramas") by Shanghai: Hanyu dacidian chubanshe. Covering mainly the loanwords form Mongolian.

=== Chinese learners ===
Employing corpus linguistics and lists of Chinese characters arranged by frequency of usage (e.g., List of Commonly Used Characters in Modern Chinese), lexicographers have compiled dictionaries for learners of Chinese as a foreign language. These specialized Chinese dictionaries are available either as add-ons to existing publications like Yuan's 2004 Pocket Dictionary and Wenlin or as specific ones like

- Fenn, Courtenay H. and Hsien-tseng Chin. 1926. The Five Thousand Dictionary; A Chinese-English Pocket Dictionary. Mission Book Company. 1942. rev. American ed. Harvard University Press. 1973. 13th reprinting.
- Huang, Po-fei. 1973. IFEL Vocabulary of Spoken Chinese. Yale University Far Eastern Publications.
- Liu, Eric Shen. 1973. Frequency dictionary of Chinese words (Linguistic structures). Mouton.
- Ho, Yong. 2001. Chinese-English Frequency Dictionary: A Study Guide to Mandarin Chinese's 500 Most Frequently Used Words. Hippocrene Books. Cover image
- Burkhardt, Michael. 2010. TPS Frequency Dictionary of Mandarin Chinese: A Study Guide to 2,500 Characters and Over 24,000 Words and Phrases. Raleigh, NC: Lulu Press.

== Deficiencies ==
Victor H. Mair lists eight adverse features of traditional Chinese lexicography, some of which have continued up to the present day: (1) persistent confusion of spoken word with written graph; (2) lack of etymological science as opposed to the analysis of script; (3) absence of the concept of word; (4) ignoring the script's historical developments in the oracle bones and bronze inscriptions; (5) no precise, unambiguous, and convenient means for specifying pronunciations; (6) no standardized, user-friendly means for looking up words and graphs; (7) failure to distinguish linguistically between vernacular and literary registers, or between usages peculiar to different regions and times; and (8) open-endedness of the writing system, with current unabridged character dictionaries containing 60,000 to 85,000 graphs.

== See also ==
- List of Chinese dictionaries
- Chinese character orders
- Chinese character sets

== Online Chinese dictionaries ==
- Atlas Sémantiques : Clique (graph theory) based visual dictionary
- Chinese English Dictionary for Learners
- Chinese Tools Dictionary
- Chinese Notes - open source Chinese-Dictionary
- WrittenChinese.Com Free Online Chinese-English Dictionary Search results are ranked by frequency of occurrence in everyday Chinese text.
- Stroke Order Animation & Dictionary Arch Chinese
- YellowBridge Chinese Dictionary Mandarin-English Dictionary & Thesaurus
- DICT.TW 線上字典, Online Dictionary
- CEDICT: Chinese–English Dictionary, Mandarintools
- Chinese-Character Dictionary Web, Rick Harbaugh
- Lin Yutang's Chinese–English Dictionary of Modern Usage, Chinese University of Hong Kong
- 康熙字典網上版, Kangxi Dictionary (in Chinese)
- CTP Dictionary Classical Chinese-character usage dictionary
- bab.la a Wikipedia-style language portal
- Malay Chinese Dictionary
- Chinese-French dictionary with handwriting recognition
