= Chinese character education =

Teaching and learning of Chinese characters

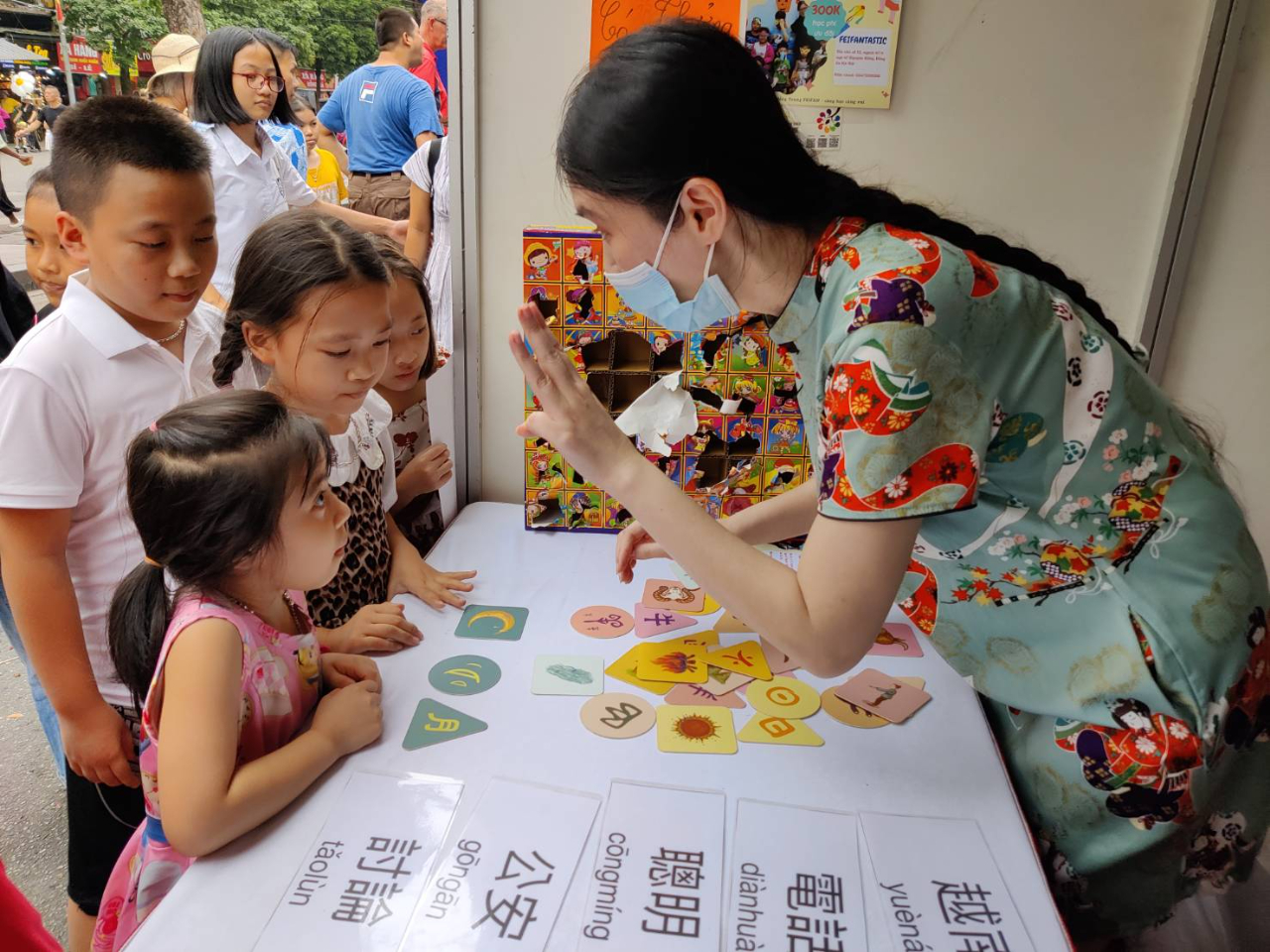
Children learning by playing guessing games about the evolution of Chinese characters

Chinese character education is the teaching and learning of Chinese characters. When written Chinese appeared in social communication, Chinese character teaching came into being. From ancient times to the present, the teaching of Chinese characters has always been the focus of Chinese language teaching.

The following is an introduction to the historical development of Chinese character education, modern native language Chinese character education, foreign language Chinese character education, teaching methods for Chinese character reading and writing, computer-assisted Chinese character teaching, as well as a comparison between Chinese character and alphabetic writing.

== Methods during antiquity ==
In ancient times, research on Chinese character teaching focused on the preparation of various centralized literacy textbooks and dictionaries. Among them, the ones with greater impact include:

- Western Zhou dynasty: Shizhoupian (史籀篇, written in big seal script, 827–782 BCE)
- Qin dynasty: Cangjiepian (仓颉篇, small seal script, 220 BCE)
- Western Han dynasty: Jijiupian (急就篇, clerical script, around 40 BCE)
- Southern and Northern dynasties: Thousand Character Classic (千字文, regular script, 502–549)
- Song dynasty: Hundred Family Surnames (百家姓, regular script, 960–1279)
- Song dynasty: Three Character Classic (三字经, regular script, 13th century).

Starting from the Song dynasty, the three books of "Three Character Classic", "Hundred Family Surnames" and "Thousand Character Classic" developed into a set of teaching materials, collectively called "Three Hundred Thousand" (三百千, about 2,000 different characters), which were used for over 1000 years until the end of the Qing dynasty, and still have a certain influence today. "Three Hundred Thousand" is arranged in rhyme form to make it catchy and easy to remember. Another influential literacy textbook is "Wenzi Mengqiu" (文字蒙求) compiled for children by the Qing dynasty writer Wang Jun, which contains 2,049 characters.

These ancient literacy textbooks have two important characteristics: 1. Use common characters, 2. the number of characters collected is about 3,000. This seems to be a desirable approach now.

== Modern native education ==
Modern Chinese character education is an important component of primary education in China, and an important part of literacy teaching and teaching Chinese as a foreign language. The subtopics include:

=== Character lists in primary education ===
The method is to use high-frequency characters according to frequency statistics. The important character lists include:

- Applied Lexis of Vernacular Chinese (語體文應用字彙, 1928), 4,261 characters.
- List of Frequently Used Characters in Modern Chinese (现代汉语常用字表, State Language Commission, Beijing, 1988), 3,500 characters.
- List of Commonly Used Standard Chinese Characters, the 3,500 primary characters in this list of 8,105 characters of the Simplified Chinese writing system, released by the State Council of PRC in June 2013,)
- Chart of Standard Forms of Common National Characters (1979), including 4,808 commonly used Chinese characters.

=== Literacy ===
Literacy education means to eradicate illiteracy. Chinese character literacy movement began in the early 20th century, when the literacy level of ordinary Chinese people was quite low. Intellectuals who cared about the country and its people advocated education to save the country and started a Chinese character literacy campaign.

The earliest and most influential literacy character list at that time was the "One Hundred and One Hundred Basic Chinese Character Usage Teaching Methods" compiled by Hong Shen. According to the meaning and expression needs, selected the most representative characters from each group of synonyms. When encountering characters other than the basic characters, the writer is encouraged to change to express with basic characters.

In June 1952, the Ministry of Education of China published a list of commonly used literacy characters, including 2,000 characters for use in literacy textbooks. In 1984, the Ministry of Education in China announced that the proportion of illiterate people in the total population dropped from more than 80% in 1949 to 23.5% in 1982. In February 1988, the State Council promulgated the "Regulations on Illiteracy Elimination Work", which stipulates literacy standards: "Farmers can read 1,500 characters, employees of enterprises and institutions, and urban residents can read 2,000 characters; be able to read popular newspapers, periodicals, and articles, and be able to record simple accounts, can write practical essays.” In 1993, the State Language Commission published the "Character List for Literacy", which includes Table A and B. Table A contains 1,800 characters that are required for literacy in the country, and Table B contains 200 reference characters for literacy. According to UNESCO, by 2015, China's illiteracy rate had dropped to 3.6 percent.

== Foreign language education ==
In the 3rd century AD, Chinese characters were introduced to Korea, thereafter to Japan, Vietnam and other countries. Thus, teaching Chinese characters to foreigners began. By 1989, there were more than 100 colleges and universities teaching Chinese as a foreign language in China.

From 1990 to 1991, the National Leading Group for Teaching Chinese as a Foreign Language and the Chinese Proficiency Test Center of Beijing Language Institute jointly developed the "汉语水平词汇与汉字等级大纲" (Outline of the Graded Vocabulary and Characters for HSK). The Chinese character outline contains 2,905 characters, divided into four grades: 800 Grade A characters, 804 Grade B characters, 601 Grade C characters, and 700 Grade D characters. Among these 2,905 characters, 2,485 are first-level frequently used characters in the "现代汉语常用字表" (List of Frequently Used Modern Chinese Characters). Teaching Chinese characters as a foreign language has received more and more attention, and textbooks and elective courses in this area have appeared. There are now more than 200 Confucius Institutes teaching Chinese as a foreign language.

According to a survey by Li Dasui, the research papers on Chinese character teaching to foreigners can be roughly divided into the following aspects:

- The relationship between Chinese character teaching and Chinese language teaching
- Discussion on "character-based" and "word-based" teaching
- The contents and methods of Chinese character teaching
- Compilation of Chinese character teaching materials
- Research on the ontology of Chinese characters (mainly research on glyph structure and pictophonetic characters)
- Research on Chinese character learning for foreign students

== Teaching methods ==
=== Reading ===
The teaching methods for Chinese character reading include:

- Phonetic literacy. In the early years, Chinese phonetic symbols bopomofo were the major tools for phonetic annotation. After the Hanyu Pinyin scheme was announced in 1958, Hanyu Pinyin has become the most-frequently used tools. In 1982, the primary school Chinese language teaching reform experiment of "Phonetic annotation, reading and writing in advance" was successfully carried out in mainland China.
- Centralized literacy and decentralized literacy. Concentrated literacy means concentrated character learning before text reading; decentralized literacy refers to character learning and text reading being carried out at the same time. The two methods can be used in combination for better effects.
- Glyph analysis method, include (1) internal structural analysis, considering pronunciation and meaning, which is helpful for comprehensively grasping the form, pronunciation and meaning of Chinese characters; and (2) External structural analysis, only consider the forms and not the pronunciation and meaning. This method is applicable to all Chinese characters.

Other methods, including classification of characters by radicals, comparison of similar characters, homophone comparison, application of pictures and games, etc.

=== Writing ===
The structure of Chinese characters is complex and an effective method for teaching students to write is needed. The teaching methods are as follow:

In ancient China, students wrote with a brush pen. The order of teaching students to write is: first write in middle-sized Chinese regular script, then in big or small regular characters. The steps of practice are: first trace red (描红, trace in black ink over characters printed in red), then copy model (摹帖, copy on a transparent paper covering the model characters), and then write model (临帖, copy the model characters on a page put nearby).

Nowadays, Chinese character writing has evolved from only using brush pens to include hard pens, such as ballpens and fountain pens. First, the teacher will teach the writing posture and how to hold the pen, and then teach the writing methods of various strokes and the rules of stroke order. And explain the glyph structure, etc.

Lower grades students often practice writing in air (书空, write in the air with a moving finger). After class, students are required to use Tianzi grid (田字格) or Rice grid (米字格) exercise books to copy new characters. In addition, students are taught to use computers and mobile phones to input Chinese characters.

== Computer assistance ==
There are various application courseware to help with Chinese character teaching and learning. For example,

- Animation software to teach stroke order, showing how a Chinese character is written stroke by stroke from beginning to the end.
- Matching software allowing the student to drag and match a picture to its matching character.
- Software to help the student to learn simplified Chinese characters from a background of traditional character, enhancing the ability to identify simplified characters and convert them back to the traditional characters, or vice versa.
- Software to train the student to identify typos characters in a text and correct them on the computer, or to identify a dialect word and convert it into standard Mandarin.
- Chinese character testing software on the Web with multiple-choice questions and fill-in-the-blank questions, and the function of automatic marking.
- Chinese character learning supported by computer games and simulation, and by Chinese and bilingual corpora on the computer.
- Courseware building tools for the teacher to develop their own software to support lecturing, exercising and testing.

== Chinese character and alphabetic writing ==
Chinese characters are morpheme characters, which record the smallest lexical and grammatical units. There are thousands of commonly used Chinese characters, each with its own forms, sounds, and meanings. The Latin alphabet is a phonetic script that records the smallest phonetic units with distinctive meanings. There are only 26 Latin letters. To learn an alphabetical language, one must first learn the pronunciation of the letters, and then learn the alphabetical words through the orthography. Therefore, it is difficult to get started learning Chinese characters, but it is easy to get started learning Pinyin characters.

Chinese language learning also has its own advantages. There are 3,500 commonly used Chinese characters. Once you master these characters or a few more characters, you can read and write almost freely. If Chinese characters are changed to alphabetical characters, it will be easier to get started, but homophones, especially homophone morphemes, will bring huge obstacles to word learning. In addition, the semantic, phonetic, and radical components of Chinese characters are all helpful in teaching Chinese characters.

== See also ==
- Language education
- Chinese as a foreign language
- Simplified Chinese characters#Education
- Literacy in China
- Computer-assisted language learning
