= Character dictionary =

Character dictionary (Chinese: 字典; Japanese: 字書), known as zìdiǎn in Mandarin Chinese, is a dictionary which lists individual Chinese characters (or kanji) and defines the characters' meanings, usages, and pronunciations. Character dictionaries are often arranged according to the shape of characters and usually include some rare characters.

== See also ==
- Chinese dictionary
- Japanese dictionary
