= Zhengzitong =

17th-century Chinese dictionary

The Zhengzitong (Chinese: 正字通; pinyin: Zhèngzìtōng; Wade–Giles: Cheng-tzu-t'ung; lit. 'Correct Character Mastery') was a 17th-century Chinese dictionary. The Ming dynasty scholar Zhang Zilie (張自烈; Chang Tzu-lieh) originally published it in 1627 as a supplement to the 1615 Zihui dictionary of Chinese characters, and called it the Zihui bian (字彙辯; "Zihui Disputations"). The Qing dynasty author Liao Wenying (廖文英; Liao Wen-ying) bought Zhang's manuscript, renamed it Zhengzitong, and published it under his own name in 1671.

The received edition Zhengzitong has over 33,000 headwords in 12 fascicles (卷). Following the format of the Zihui, the character headwords give alternate graphs, fanqie spellings, definitions, explanations, and citations from Chinese classic texts. Zhang Zilie was a native of Jiangxi Province, and his Zhengzitong contains many linguistically valuable dialectal terms from Southeastern China. The famous 1716 Kangxi Zidian relied heavily upon the Zhengzitong.
