= Longkan Shoujian =

Chinese dictionary

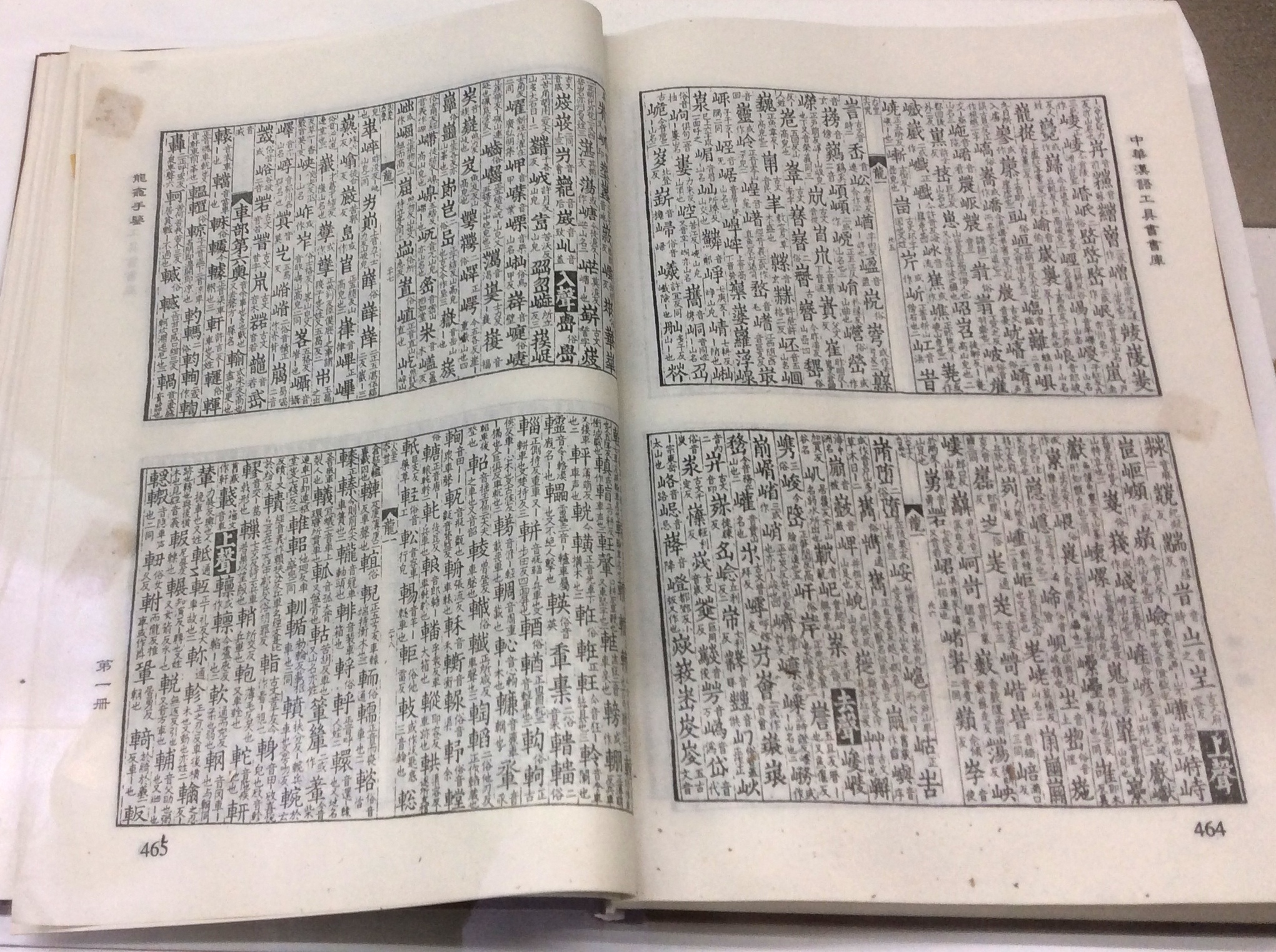
- A modern reprint of the Longkan Shoujian in the Chinese Dictionary Museum, Jincheng, Shanxi
- Author: Xingjun (行均)
- Original title: 龍龕手鑒
- Language: Classical Chinese
- Subject: Chinese dictionary, Buddhist phonology
- Genre: Reference work
- Published: 997
- Publication place: Liao dynasty, China
- Media type: Manuscript (original), print (modern reprint)
- Pages: 4 fascicles (卷)
- Preceded by: Ganlu Zishu
- Followed by: —

Longkan Shoujian (Chinese: 龍龕手鑒; lit. 'The Handy Mirror in the Dragon Shrine') is a Chinese dictionary compiled during the Liao dynasty by the Khitan monk Xingjun (行均). Completed in 997, the work had originally been entitled Longkan Shoujing (龍龕手鏡; 鑒 and 鏡 are synonyms), but had its title changed owing to naming taboo when it was later printed by the Song publishers. (Emperor Taizu's grandfather had the name 敬, a homophone of 鏡.) The earliest surviving edition of the work is an incomplete Korean one, reprinted in China in 1985.

Longkan Shoujian was one of the many Buddhist yinyishu (音義書; 'dictionary of pronunciations and meanings') produced in ancient China, which were meant to aid the study of Buddhist scriptures. However, the work stands out in two aspects. Firstly, its method of collation is innovative. While Chinese dictionaries before Shoujian collate characters either graphically (by radical) or phonetically (by tone and rime), the work employs both methods: the radicals, which number 242 (including the "radical" za (雜; 'miscellaneous'), where characters that are difficult to analyze graphically are found), are grouped by tone into four groups (each group occupies one juan (卷) or fascicle); the characters under each radical are in turn grouped by tone. Secondly, it collects more than 26,000 characters with a huge proportion of variant characters. Many of these variants are not recorded in any other works.

The characters in it are divided, in terms of orthography, into "standard" (正; zheng), "vulgar" (俗; su), "contemporary" (今; jin), "archaic" (古; gu) and "alternative" (或作; huozuo), a classification more elaborated than that used in Ganlu Zishu. The pronunciations of characters in it are indicated by either homophone or fanqie spelling. For some characters, only the pronunciations are given, not the meanings.

While being criticized for its unorthodox collation and collection by the Qing philologists, it is hailed by Pan (1980) as an essential guide for deciphering the Dunhuang manuscripts, which contains a large amount of "vulgar" characters.
