= Basic Hanja for Educational Use =

Set of hanja taught in Korean schools

- Hangul: 한문 교육용 기초 한자
- Hanja: 漢文敎育用基礎漢字
- RR: Hanmun gyoyungnyong gicho hanja
- MR: Hanmun kyoyungnyong kich'o hancha

Basic Hanja for Educational Use (Korean: 한문 교육용 기초 한자) are a subset of Hanja defined in 1972 (and subsequently revised in 2000) by the South Korean Ministry of Education for educational use. Students are expected to learn 900 characters in middle school and a further 900 at high school.

== List ==
Sino-Korean Reading		Middle School	High School
Hangul	RR	Middle School	High School
가	ga	佳 · 假 · 價 · 加 · 可 · 家 · 歌 · 街	暇 · 架
각	gak	各 · 脚 · 角	刻 · 却 · 覺 · 閣
간	gan	干 · 看 · 間	刊 · 姦 · 幹 · 懇 · 簡 · 肝
갈	gal	渴	
감	gam	感 · 敢 · 減 · 甘	監 · 鑑
갑	gap	甲	
강	gang	強 · 江 · 講 · 降	剛 · 康 · 綱 · 鋼
개	gae	個 · 改 · 皆 · 開	介 · 慨 · 槪 · 蓋
객	gaek	客	
갱	gaeng	更	
거	geo	去 · 居 · 巨 · 擧 · 車	拒 · 據 · 距
건	geon	乾 · 建	件 · 健
걸	geol		乞 · 傑
검	geom		儉 · 劍 · 檢
격	gyeok		擊 · 格 · 激 · 隔
견	gyeon	堅 · 犬 · 見	牽 · 絹 · 肩 · 遣
결	gyeol	決 · 潔 · 結	缺
겸	gyeom		兼 · 謙
경	gyeong	京 · 庚 · 慶 · 敬 · 景 · 競 · 經 · 耕 · 輕 · 驚	傾 · 卿 · 境 · 徑 · 硬 · 竟 · 警 · 鏡 · 頃
계	gye	季 · 溪 · 界 · 癸 · 計 · 鷄	係 · 啓 · 契 · 戒 · 桂 · 械 · 系 · 繫 · 繼 · 階
고	go	古 · 告 · 固 · 故 · 考 · 苦 · 高	姑 · 孤 · 庫 · 枯 · 稿 · 顧 · 鼓
곡	gok	曲 · 穀 · 谷	哭
곤	gon	困 · 坤	
골	gol	骨	
공	gong	公 · 共 · 功 · 工 · 空	供 · 孔 · 恐 · 恭 · 攻 · 貢
과	gwa	果 · 科 · 課 · 過	寡 · 誇
곽	gwak		郭
관	gwan	官 · 觀 · 關	冠 · 寬 · 慣 · 管 · 貫 · 館
광	gwang	光 · 廣	狂 · 鑛
괘	gwae		掛
괴	goe		塊 · 壞 · 怪 · 愧
교	gyo	交 · 敎 · 校 · 橋	巧 · 矯 · 較 · 郊
구	gu	久 · 九 · 口 · 句 · 救 · 求 · 究 · 舊	丘 · 俱 · 具 · 區 · 懼 · 拘 · 構 · 狗 · 球 · 苟 · 驅 · 龜
국	guk	國	局 · 菊
군	gun	君 · 軍 · 郡	群
굴	gul		屈
궁	gung	弓	宮 · 窮
권	gwon	勸 · 卷 · 權	券 · 拳
궐	gwol		厥
궤	gwe		軌
귀	gwi	歸 · 貴	鬼
규	gyu		叫 · 糾 · 規
균	gyun	均	菌
극	geuk	極	克 · 劇
근	geun	勤 · 根 · 近	僅 · 斤 · 謹
금	geum	今 · 禁 · 金	琴 · 禽 · 錦
급	geup	及 · 急 · 給	級
긍	geung		肯
기	gi	其 · 基 · 己 · 幾 · 技 · 旣 · 期 · 氣 · 記 · 起	企 · 器 · 奇 · 寄 · 忌 · 旗 · 棄 · 機 · 欺 · 畿 · 祈 · 紀 · 豈 · 飢 · 騎
긴	gin		緊
길	gil	吉	
나	na		那
낙	nak		諾
난	nan	暖 · 難	
남	nam	南 · 男	
납	nap		納
낭	nang		娘
내	nae	乃 · 內	奈 · 耐
녀	nyeo	女	
년	nyeon	年	
념	nyeom	念	
녕	nyeong		寧
노	no	怒	努 · 奴
농	nong	農	
뇌	noe		惱 · 腦
능	neung	能	
니	ni		泥
다	da	多	茶
단	dan	丹 · 但 · 單 · 短 · 端	團 · 壇 · 斷 · 旦 · 檀 · 段
달	dal	達	
담	dam	談	擔 · 淡
답	dap	答	畓 · 踏
당	dang	堂 · 當	唐 · 糖 · 黨
대	dae	代 · 大 · 對 · 待	帶 · 臺 · 貸 · 隊
덕	deok	德	
도	do	刀 · 到 · 圖 · 島 · 度 · 徒 · 道 · 都	倒 · 塗 · 導 · 挑 · 桃 · 渡 · 盜 · 稻 · 跳 · 逃 · 途 · 陶
독	dok	獨 · 讀	毒 · 督 · 篤
돈	don		敦 · 豚
돌	dol		突
동	dong	冬 · 動 · 同 · 東 · 洞 · 童	凍 · 銅
두	du	斗 · 豆 · 頭	
둔	dun		屯 · 鈍
득	deuk	得	
등	deung	燈 · 登 · 等	騰
라	ra		羅
락	rak	樂 · 落	絡
란	ran	卵	亂 · 欄 · 蘭
람	ram		濫 · 覽
랑	rang	浪 · 郞	廊
래	rae	來	
랭	raeng	冷	
략	ryak		掠 · 略
량	ryang	兩 · 涼 · 良 · 量	梁 · 糧 · 諒
려	ryeo	旅	勵 · 慮 · 麗
력	ryeok	力 · 歷	曆
련	ryeon	練 · 連	憐 · 戀 · 聯 · 蓮 · 鍊
렬	ryeol	列 · 烈	劣 · 裂
렴	ryeom		廉
렵	ryeop		獵
령	ryeong	令 · 領	嶺 · 零 · 靈
례	rye	例 · 禮	隷
로	ro	勞 · 老 · 路 · 露	爐
록	rok	綠	祿 · 錄 · 鹿
론	ron	論	
롱	rong		弄
뢰	roe		賴 · 雷
료	ryo	料	了 · 僚
룡	ryong		龍
루	ru		屢 · 樓 · 淚 · 漏 · 累
류	ryu	柳 · 流 · 留	類
륙	ryuk	六 · 陸	
륜	ryun	倫	輪
률	ryul	律	栗 · 率
륭	ryung		隆
릉	reung		陵
리	ri	利 · 李 · 理 · 里	吏 · 履 · 梨 · 裏 · 離
린	rin		鄰
림	rim	林	臨
립	rip	立	
마	ma	馬	磨 · 麻
막	mak	莫	幕 · 漠
만	man	晩 · 滿 · 萬	慢 · 漫
말	mal	末	
망	mang	亡 · 忙 · 忘 · 望	妄 · 罔 · 茫
매	mae	妹 · 每 · 買 · 賣	埋 · 媒 · 梅
맥	maek	麥	脈
맹	maeng		孟 · 猛 · 盟 · 盲
면	myeon	免 · 勉 · 眠 · 面	綿
멸	myeol		滅
명	myeong	名 · 命 · 明 · 鳴	冥 · 銘
모	mo	暮 · 母 · 毛	侮 · 冒 · 募 · 慕 · 某 · 模 · 謀 · 貌
목	mok	木 · 目	牧 · 睦
몰	mol		沒
몽	mong		夢 · 蒙
묘	myo	卯 · 妙	墓 · 廟 · 苗
무	mu	務 · 戊 · 武 · 無 · 舞 · 茂	貿 · 霧
묵	muk	墨	默
문	mun	問 · 文 · 聞 · 門	
물	mul	勿 · 物	
미	mi	味 · 尾 · 未 · 米 · 美	微 · 眉 · 迷
민	min	民	憫 · 敏
밀	mil	密	蜜
박	bak	朴	博 · 拍 · 泊 · 薄 · 迫
반	ban	半 · 反 · 飯	伴 · 叛 · 班 · 盤 · 般 · 返
발	bal	發	拔 · 髮
방	bang	房 · 放 · 方 · 訪 · 防	倣 · 傍 · 妨 · 芳 · 邦
배	bae	拜 · 杯	倍 · 培 · 排 · 背 · 輩 · 配
백	baek	白 · 百	伯
번	beon	番	煩 · 繁 · 飜
벌	beol	伐	罰
범	beom	凡	犯 · 範
법	beop	法	
벽	byeok		壁 · 碧
변	byeon	變	辨 · 辯 · 邊
별	byeol	別	
병	byeong	丙 · 兵 · 病	屛 · 竝
보	bo	保 · 報 · 步	寶 · 普 · 補 · 譜
복	bok	伏 · 復 · 服 · 福	卜 · 腹 · 複 · 覆
본	bon	本	
봉	bong	奉 · 逢	封 · 峯 · 蜂 · 鳳
부	bu	否 · 夫 · 婦 · 富 · 扶 · 浮 · 父 · 部	付 · 副 · 府 · 符 · 簿 · 腐 · 負 · 賦 · 赴 · 附
북	buk	北	
분	bun	分	墳 · 奔 · 奮 · 憤 · 粉 · 紛
불	bul	不 · 佛	拂
붕	bung	朋	崩
비	bi	備 · 比 · 悲 · 非 · 飛 · 鼻	卑 · 妃 · 婢 · 批 · 碑 · 祕 · 肥 · 費
빈	bin	貧	賓 · 頻
빙	bing	氷	聘
사	sa	事 · 仕 · 使 · 史 · 四 · 士 · 寺 · 巳 · 射 · 師 · 思 · 死 · 私 · 絲 · 舍 · 謝	似 · 司 · 寫 · 捨 · 斜 · 斯 · 査 · 沙 · 祀 · 社 · 蛇 · 詐 · 詞 · 賜 · 辭 · 邪
삭	sak		削 · 朔
산	san	山 · 散 · 產 · 算	
살	sal	殺	
삼	sam	三	
상	sang	上 · 傷 · 商 · 喪 · 尙 · 常 · 想 · 相 · 賞 · 霜	像 · 償 · 嘗 · 床 · 桑 · 狀 · 祥 · 裳 · 詳 · 象
새	sae		塞
색	saek	色	索
생	saeng	生	
서	seo	序 · 暑 · 書 · 西	庶 · 徐 · 恕 · 敍 · 緖 · 署 · 誓 · 逝
석	seok	夕 · 席 · 惜 · 昔 · 石	析 · 釋
선	seon	仙 · 先 · 善 · 線 · 船 · 選 · 鮮	宣 · 旋 · 禪
설	seol	舌 · 設 · 說 · 雪	
섭	seop		攝 · 涉
성	seong	城 · 姓 · 性 · 成 · 星 · 盛 · 省 · 聖 · 聲 · 誠	
세	se	世 · 勢 · 歲 · 洗 · 稅 · 細	
소	so	小 · 少 · 所 · 消 · 笑 · 素	召 · 掃 · 昭 · 燒 · 疏 · 蔬 · 蘇 · 訴 · 騷
속	sok	俗 · 續 · 速	屬 · 束 · 粟
손	son	孫	損
송	song	松 · 送	訟 · 誦 · 頌
쇄	swae		刷 · 鎖
쇠	soe		𮕩
수	su	修 · 受 · 壽 · 守 · 愁 · 手 · 授 · 收 · 數 · 樹 · 水 · 秀 · 誰 · 雖 · 須 · 首	囚 · 垂 · 帥 · 搜 · 殊 · 獸 · 睡 · 輸 · 遂 · 隨 · 需
숙	suk	叔 · 宿 · 淑	孰 · 熟 · 肅
순	sun	純 · 順	巡 · 循 · 旬 · 殉 · 瞬 · 脣
술	sul	戌	術 · 述
숭	sung	崇	
습	seup	拾 · 習	濕 · 襲
승	seung	乘 · 勝 · 承	僧 · 昇
시	si	始 · 市 · 施 · 是 · 時 · 示 · 視 · 詩 · 試	侍 · 矢
식	sik	式 · 植 · 識 · 食	息 · 飾
신	sin	信 · 新 · 申 · 神 · 臣 · 身 · 辛	伸 · 愼 · 晨
실	sil	失 · 室 · 實	
심	sim	心 · 深 · 甚	審 · 尋
십	sip	十	
쌍	ssang		雙
씨	ssi	氏	
아	a	兒 · 我	亞 · 牙 · 芽 · 雅 · 餓
악	ak	惡	岳
안	an	安 · 案 · 眼 · 顔	岸 · 雁
알	al		謁
암	am	巖 · 暗	
압	ap		壓 · 押
앙	ang	仰	央 · 殃
애	ae	哀 · 愛	涯
액	aek		厄 · 額
야	ya	也 · 夜 · 野	耶
약	yak	弱 · 約 · 若 · 藥	躍
양	yang	揚 · 洋 · 羊 · 讓 · 陽 · 養	壤 · 楊 · 樣
어	eo	於 · 漁 · 語 · 魚	御
억	eok	億 · 憶	抑
언	eon	言	焉
엄	eom	嚴	
업	eop	業	
여	yeo	余 · 如 · 汝 · 與 · 餘	予 · 輿
역	yeok	亦 · 易 · 逆	域 · 役 · 疫 · 譯 · 驛
연	yeon	然 · 煙 · 硏	宴 · 延 · 沿 · 演 · 燃 · 燕 · 緣 · 軟 · 鉛
열	yeol	悅 · 熱	閱
염	yeom	炎	染 · 鹽
엽	yeop	葉	
영	yeong	榮 · 永 · 英 · 迎	影 · 映 · 泳 · 營 · 詠
예	ye	藝	譽 · 銳 · 豫
오	o	五 · 午 · 吾 · 悟 · 烏 · 誤	傲 · 嗚 · 娛 · 汚
옥	ok	屋 · 玉	獄
온	on	溫	
옹	ong		擁 · 翁
와	wa	瓦 · 臥	
완	wan	完	緩
왈	wal	曰	
왕	wang	往 · 王	
외	oe	外	畏
요	yo	要	搖 · 腰 · 謠 · 遙
욕	yok	欲 · 浴	慾 · 辱
용	yong	勇 · 容 · 用	庸
우	u	于 · 又 · 友 · 右 · 宇 · 尤 · 憂 · 牛 · 遇 · 雨	偶 · 優 · 愚 · 羽 · 郵
운	un	云 · 運 · 雲	韻
웅	ung	雄	
원	won	元 · 原 · 圓 · 園 · 怨 · 遠 · 願	員 · 援 · 源 · 院
월	wol	月	越
위	wi	位 · 偉 · 危 · 威 · 爲	僞 · 圍 · 委 · 慰 · 緯 · 胃 · 衛 · 謂 · 違
유	yu	唯 · 幼 · 有 · 柔 · 油 · 猶 · 由 · 遊 · 遺 · 酉	乳 · 儒 · 幽 · 悠 · 惟 · 愈 · 維 · 裕 · 誘
육	yuk	肉 · 育	
윤	yun		潤 · 閏
은	eun	恩 · 銀	隱
을	eul	乙	
음	eum	吟 · 陰 · 音 · 飮	淫
읍	eup	泣 · 邑	
응	eung	應	凝
의	ui	依 · 意 · 矣 · 義 · 衣 · 議 · 醫	儀 · 宜 · 疑
이	i	二 · 以 · 已 · 異 · 移 · 而 · 耳	夷
익	ik	益	翼
인	in	人 · 仁 · 印 · 因 · 寅 · 引 · 忍 · 認	姻
일	il	一 · 日	逸
임	im	壬	任 · 賃
입	ip	入	
자	ja	姊 · 子 · 字 · 慈 · 者 · 自	刺 · 姿 · 恣 · 紫 · 玆 · 資
작	jak	作 · 昨	爵 · 酌
잔	jan		殘
잠	jam		暫 · 潛
잡	jap		雜
장	jang	場 · 壯 · 將 · 章 · 長	丈 · 墻 · 奬 · 帳 · 張 · 掌 · 粧 · 腸 · 臟 · 莊 · 葬 · 藏 · 裝 · 障
재	jae	再 · 哉 · 在 · 才 · 材 · 栽 · 財	宰 · 災 · 裁 · 載
쟁	jaeng	爭	
저	jeo	低 · 著 · 貯	底 · 抵
적	jeok	敵 · 的 · 赤 · 適	寂 · 摘 · 滴 · 積 · 籍 · 績 · 賊 · 跡
전	jeon	傳 · 全 · 典 · 前 · 展 · 戰 · 田 · 錢 · 電	專 · 殿 · 轉
절	jeol	節 · 絕	切 · 折 · 竊
점	jeom	店	占 · 漸 · 點
접	jeop	接	蝶
정	jeong	丁 · 井 · 停 · 定 · 庭 · 情 · 政 · 正 · 淨 · 精 · 貞 · 靜 · 頂	亭 · 廷 · 征 · 整 · 程 · 訂
제	je	帝 · 弟 · 祭 · 第 · 製 · 諸 · 除 · 題	制 · 堤 · 提 · 濟 · 際 · 齊
조	jo	兆 · 助 · 早 · 朝 · 祖 · 調 · 造 · 鳥	弔 · 操 · 條 · 潮 · 照 · 燥 · 租 · 組
족	jok	族 · 足	
존	jon	存 · 尊	
졸	jol	卒	拙
종	jong	宗 · 從 · 種 · 終 · 鐘	縱
좌	jwa	坐 · 左	佐 · 座
죄	joe	罪	
주	ju	主 · 住 · 宙 · 晝 · 朱 · 注 · 走 · 酒	周 · 奏 · 州 · 柱 · 株 · 洲 · 珠 · 舟 · 鑄
죽	juk	竹	
준	jun		俊 · 準 · 遵
중	jung	中 · 衆 · 重	仲
즉	jeuk	卽	
증	jeung	增 · 曾 · 證	憎 · 症 · 蒸 · 贈
지	ji	之 · 只 · 地 · 志 · 持 · 指 · 支 · 枝 · 止 · 知 · 紙 · 至	智 · 池 · 誌 · 遲
직	jik	直	織 · 職
진	jin	盡 · 眞 · 辰 · 進	振 · 珍 · 鎭 · 陣 · 陳 · 震
질	jil	質	姪 · 疾 · 秩
집	jip	執 · 集	
징	jing		徵 · 懲
차	ch	且 · 借 · 次 · 此	差
착	chak	着	捉 · 錯
찬	chan		讚 · 贊
찰	chal	察	
참	cham	參	慘 · 慙
창	chang	唱 · 昌 · 窓	倉 · 創 · 暢 · 蒼
채	chae	採 · 菜	債 · 彩
책	chaek	冊 · 責	策
처	cheo	妻 · 處	
척	cheok	尺	戚 · 拓 · 斥
천	cheon	千 · 天 · 川 · 泉 · 淺	薦 · 賤 · 踐 · 遷
철	cheol	鐵	哲 · 徹
첨	cheom		尖 · 添
첩	cheop		妾
청	cheong	晴 · 淸 · 聽 · 請 · 靑	廳
체	che	體	替 · 滯 · 逮 · 遞
초	cho	初 · 招 · 草	抄 · 礎 · 秒 · 肖 · 超
촉	chok		促 · 燭 · 觸
촌	chon	寸 · 村	
총	chong		總 · 聰 · 銃
최	choe	最	催
추	chu	推 · 秋 · 追	抽 · 醜
축	chuk	丑 · 祝	畜 · 築 · 縮 · 蓄 · 逐
춘	chun	春	
출	chul	出	
충	chung	充 · 忠 · 蟲	衝
취	chwi	取 · 吹 · 就	臭 · 趣 · 醉
측	cheuk		側 · 測
층	cheung		層
치	chi	治 · 致 · 齒	値 · 恥 · 置
칙	chik	則	
친	chin	親	
칠	chil	七	漆
침	chim	針	侵 · 寢 · 枕 · 沈 · 浸
칭	ching		稱
쾌	kwae	快	
타	ta	他 · 打	墮 · 妥
탁	tak		卓 · 托 · 濁 · 濯
탄	tan		彈 · 歎 · 炭 · 誕
탈	tal	脫	奪
탐	tam	探	貪
탑	tap		塔
탕	tang		湯
태	tae	太 · 泰	怠 · 態 · 殆
택	taek	宅	擇 · 澤
토	to	土	吐 · 討
통	tong	統 · 通	痛
퇴	toe	退	
투	tu	投	透 · 鬪
특	teuk	特	
파	pa	波 · 破	把 · 播 · 派 · 罷 · 頗
판	pan	判	板 · 版 · 販
팔	pal	八	
패	pae	敗 · 貝	
편	pyeon	便 · 片 · 篇	偏 · 編 · 遍
평	pyeong	平	評
폐	pye	閉	幣 · 廢 · 弊 · 肺 · 蔽
포	po	布 · 抱	包 · 捕 · 浦 · 胞 · 飽
폭	pok	暴	幅 · 爆
표	pyo	表	標 · 漂 · 票
품	pum	品	
풍	pung	豐 · 風	
피	pi	彼 · 皮	疲 · 被 · 避
필	pil	匹 · 必 · 筆	畢
하	ha	下 · 何 · 夏 · 河 · 賀	荷
학	hak	學	鶴
한	han	寒 · 恨 · 漢 · 閑 · 限 · 韓	旱 · 汗
할	hal		割
함	ham		含 · 咸 · 陷
합	hap	合	
항	ahng	恒	巷 · 抗 · 港 · 航 · 項
해	hae	亥 · 害 · 海 · 解	奚 · 該
핵	haek		核
행	haeng	幸 · 行	
향	hyang	向 · 鄕 · 香	享 · 響
허	heo	虛 · 許	
헌	heon		憲 · 獻 · 軒
험	heom		險 · 驗
혁	hyeok	革	
현	hyeon	現 · 賢	懸 · 玄 · 絃 · 縣 · 顯
혈	hyeol	血	穴
혐	hyeom		嫌
협	hyeop	協	脅
형	hyeong	兄 · 刑 · 形	亨 · 螢 · 衡
혜	hye	惠	兮 · 慧
호	ho	乎 · 呼 · 好 · 戶 · 湖 · 虎 · 號	互 · 毫 · 浩 · 胡 · 護 · 豪
혹	hok	或	惑
혼	hon	婚 · 混	昏 · 魂
홀	hol		忽
홍	hong	紅	弘 · 洪 · 鴻
화	hwa	化 · 和 · 火 · 畫 · 花 · 華 · 話 · 貨	禍 · 禾
확	hwak		擴 · 確 · 穫
환	hwan	患 · 歡	丸 · 換 · 環 · 還
활	hwal	活	
황	hwang	皇 · 黃	況 · 荒
회	hoe	回 · 會	悔 · 懷
획	hoek		劃 · 獲
횡	hoeng		橫
효	hyo	孝 · 效	曉
후	hu	厚 · 後	侯 · 候
훈	hun	訓	
훼	hwe		毁
휘	hwi		揮 · 輝
휴	hyu	休	携
흉	hyung	凶 · 胸	
흑	heok	黑	
흡	heup		吸
흥	heung	興	
희	hui	喜 · 希	戱 · 稀

== See also ==
- Kyōiku kanji
- Jōyō kanji
