= ABC Chinese–English Dictionary =

Chinese-English dictionary

- Front cover of ABC Chinese–English Dictionary
- Author: John DeFrancis
- Language: Chinese, English
- Publisher: University of Hawaiʻi Press
- Publication date: 1996
- Publication place: United States
- Media type: print
- Pages: xix, 897
- ISBN: 0824817443
- OCLC: 33335250

The ABC Chinese–English Dictionary or ABC Dictionary (1996), compiled under the chief editorship of John DeFrancis, is the first Chinese dictionary to collate entries in single-sort alphabetical order of pinyin romanization, and a landmark in the history of Chinese lexicography. It was also the first publication in the University of Hawaiʻi Press's "ABC" (Alphabetically Based Computerized) series of Chinese dictionaries. They republished the ABC Chinese–English Dictionary in a pocket edition (1999) and desktop reference edition (2000), as well as the expanded ABC Chinese–English Comprehensive Dictionary (2003), and dual ABC English–Chinese, Chinese–English Dictionary (2010). Furthermore, the ABC Dictionary databases have been developed into computer applications such as Wenlin Software for learning Chinese (1997).

== History ==
John DeFrancis (1911–2009) was an influential American sinologist, author of Chinese language textbooks, lexicographer of Chinese dictionaries, and Professor Emeritus of Chinese Studies at the University of Hawaiʻi at Mānoa. After he retired from teaching in 1976, DeFrancis was a prolific author of influential works such as The Chinese Language: Fact and Fantasy (1984) and Visible Speech: The Diverse Oneness of Writing Systems (1989).

Victor H. Mair, a sinologist and professor of Chinese at the University of Pennsylvania, first proposed the idea of a computerized pinyin Chinese–English dictionary in his 1986 lexicographical review article. He defined "alphabetically arranged dictionary" to mean a dictionary in which all words (cí 詞) are "interfiled strictly according to pronunciation. This may be referred to as a 'single sort/tier/layer alphabetical' order or series." He emphatically does not mean a usual Chinese dictionary collated according to the initial single graphs (zì 字) that are only the beginning syllables of whole words. "With the latter type of arrangement, more than one sort is required to locate a given term. The head character must first be found and then a separate sort is required for the next character, and so on." Mair's article had two purposes, to call the attention of his colleagues to the critical need for an alphabetically arranged Chinese dictionary and to enlist their help in making it a reality, and to suggest that all new sinological reference tools should at least include alphabetically ordered indices. "Someone who already knows the pronunciation of a given expression but not its meaning should not be cruelly burdened by having to fuss with radicals, corners, strokes, and what not. Let him go directly to the object of his search instead of having to make endless, insufferable detours in an impenetrable forest of graphs."

In DeFrancis' Acknowledgements, he says "This dictionary owes its genesis to the initiative of Victor H. Mair", who after unsuccessful attempts to obtain financial support for the compilation of an alphabetically based Chinese–English dictionary, in 1990 organized an international group of scholars who volunteered to contribute towards compiling it. However, "agonizingly slow progress" made it apparent that a fulltime editor was necessary, and in May 1992 John DeFrancis offered to undertake the project centered at the University of Hawaiʻi.

Along with Prof. DeFrancis overseeing the general planning and supervision of the project as well as its detailed operations, a volunteer team of some 50 contributors – including academics, Chinese language teachers, students, lexicographers, and computer consultants – were involved in the myriad tasks of processing dictionary entries, such as defining, inputting, checking, and proofreading. The University of Hawaiʻi Press published the ABC Chinese–English Dictionary in September 1996. UHP republished the original paperback ABC Chinese–English Dictionary, which had a total 916 pages and was 23 cm. high, into the ABC Chinese–English Dictionary: Pocket Edition (1999, 16 cm.) and hardback ABC Chinese–English Dictionary: Desk Reference Edition (2000, 23 cm.).

In Shanghai, DeFrancis' dictionary was published under the title Han-Ying Cidian: ABC Chinese–English Dictionary (Hanyu Dacidian Chubanshe, 1997). For reasons of political correctness, the Shanghai edition amended the entry for Lin Biao. It altered the original American edition's "veteran Communist military leader and Mao Zedong's designated successor until mysterious death" to "veteran Communist military leader; ringleader of counterrevolutionary group (during the Cultural Revolution)".

Victor H. Mair became general editor of the ABC Chinese Dictionary Series in 1996, and the University of Hawaiʻi Press has issued ten publications (as of October 2016), including two developments from the ABC Chinese–English Dictionary (1996) with 71,486 head entries. John DeFrancis and others edited the hardback ABC Chinese–English Comprehensive Dictionary,(2003, 1464 pp., 25 cm.), which contains over 196,501 head entries, making it the most comprehensive one-volume dictionary of Chinese. DeFrancis (posthumously) and Zhang Yanyin, professor of Applied Linguistics and Educational Linguistics at the University of Canberra, edited the bidirectional paperback ABC English–Chinese, Chinese–English Dictionary (2010, 1240 pp., 19 cm.). It contains 67,633 entries: 29,670 in the English–Chinese section, 37,963 in the Chinese–English section, which is an abridgment of the ABC Chinese–English Comprehensive Dictionary and includes improvements such as more usage example sentences.

Computers (namely, the C in ABC Dictionary) were purposefully involved in almost every stage of dictionary compilation and publication in order to facilitate further advances in electronic lexicography and software development. In 1997, the Wenlin Institute published Wenlin Software for Learning Chinese with about 14,000 head entries (version 1.0) and entered into a licensing agreement with the University of Hawaiʻi to utilize the ABC Dictionary database in Wenlin software. The first edition ABC Chinese–English Dictionary (1996) was incorporated into Wenlin 2.0 with over 74,000 entries (1998); the second ABC Chinese–English Comprehensive Dictionary (2003) went into Wenlin 3.0 with over 196,000 entries (2002); and the third edition ABC English–Chinese, Chinese–English Dictionary (2010) was incorporated into Wenlin 4.0 (2011), which includes 300,000 Chinese–English entries, 73,000 Chinese character entries, and 62,000 English–Chinese entries.

Prior to the alphabetically arranged ABC Chinese–English Dictionary, virtually every Chinese dictionary was based upon character head entries, arranged either by character shape or pronunciation, that subsume words and phrases written with that head character as the first syllable. While pronunciation determines the placement of words within the unconventional ABC Dictionary, Chinese characters still determine the position of words within a standard dictionary. Comparing a Chinese character-based dictionary with the pinyin-based ABC Dictionary illustrates the difference. The Chinese–English Dictionary locates the head character entry lín 林 "① forest; woods; grove ② circles ..." as one of 14 characters pronounced lín, and alphabetically lists 17 words with lín as the first syllable, for instance, línchǎnpǐn 林产品 "forest products", línhǎi 林海 "immense forest", and línyè 林業 "forestry". The ABC Dictionary includes lín 林 "① forest; woods; grove ② forestry..." as one of 6 characters pronounced lín, followed by alphabetically listed lin-initial headwords from línbā 淋巴 "lymph" to línfēng 臨風 "facing against the wind", but then ling-initial words begin to appear with líng 〇 "zero", and only after another three pages will one find lìngzūn 令尊 "(courteous) your father" followed by línhǎi "immense forest". DeFrancis' ABC Chinese–English Dictionary is aptly described as having "defied the tyranny of Chinese characters".

== Content ==
The ABC Dictionary includes 5,425 different Chinese characters and a total 71,486 lexical entries. The dictionary's most notable feature is being entirely arranged by pinyin in the alphabetical order of complete compound words. For example, kuàngquán 矿泉 "mineral spring" immediately precedes kuángquǎnbìng 狂犬病 "rabies", which in turn immediately precedes kuàngquánshuǐ 矿泉水 "mineral water", even though the first and last words begin with the same character and the middle word with another.

The present dictionary has several titles:

- ABC Dictionary (half title page)
- The ABC Chinese–English Dictionary: Alphabetically Based Computerized—with the last three words encircling Chinese calligraphic 电脑拼音编码 [diànnǎo pīnyīn biānmǎ "computer pinyin encoding"] (title page)
- ABC (Alphabetically Based Computerized) Chinese–English Dictionary (colophon)
- ABC Chinese–English Dictionary 漢英詞典‧按羅馬字母順序排列 [Hàn-Yīng cídiǎn ‧ àn luómǎ zìmǔ shùnxù páiliè "Chinese–English Dictionary: according to alphabetically sorted romanization"] (front cover).

The ABC Chinese–English Dictionary comprises three main sections: an 18-page front matter, the 833-page body matter of alphabetically arranged entries, and 64-page back matter with nine appendices.

The front matter includes a Table of contents; Dedication to "China's Staunchest Advocates of Writing Reform"; Editor's Call to Action; Acknowledgments; Introduction with I. Distinctive Features of the Dictionary and II. Selection and Definition of Entries; and User's Guide with I. Arrangement of Entries, II. Orthography, III. Explanatory Notes and Examples, IV. Works Consulted, and V. Abbreviations.

The dictionary proper gives alphabetically arranged lexical entries and English translation equivalents, from "a* 啊 part. [i.e., particle] used as phrase suffix ① (in enumeration) ... ② (in direct address and exclamation) ... ③ (indicating obviousness/impatience ... ④ (for confirmation)" to "zúzūn 族尊 n. clan seniors".

The ABC Dictionary has nine Appendices: I. Basic Rules for Hanyu Pinyin Orthography [promulgated by the State Language Commission in 1988]; II. Historical Chronology [from the Shang Dynasty c. 1700–1045 BC to the Republic of China "1912–1949" [sic] and People's Republic of China 1949–]; III. Analytic Summary of Transcription Systems [for Pinyin, Wade-Giles, Gwoyeu Romatzyh, Yale Romanization, and Zhuyin Fuhao]; IV. Wade-Giles/Pinyin Comparative Table; V. PY/WG/GR/YR/ZF Comparative Table; VI. Radical Index of Traditional Characters, Notes on Kangxi Radicals, Kangxi Radical Chart, Kangxi Radical Index; VII. Stroke Order List of Recurrent Partials; VIII. Stroke Order Index of Characters with Obscure Radicals; IX. Radical Index of Simplified Characters, with Notes on Selected CASS Radicals [viz. the Chinese Academy of Social Sciences system of 189 radicals used in dictionaries like the Xinhua Zidian], High Frequency CASS Radicals, Simplified/Traditional Radical Conversion Table, CASS Radical Chart, CASS Radical Index [for users who want to look up a Chinese logograph's pronunciation, listing the 5,425 characters appearing in the dictionary].

DeFrancis' ABC Chinese–English Dictionary claims six lexicographical distinctions.

1. It offers the powerful advantage of arranging entries in single-sort alphabetical order as by far the simplest and fastest way to look up a term whose pronunciation is known. Alone among look-up systems, the ABC Dictionary enables users to find words seen only in transcription or heard but not seen in written form. And, since most dictionary consultation involves characters whose pronunciation is known (not just by native speakers, but also by learners beyond the very beginning level), over time the total saving in time is enormous. (Radical indexes of characters are provided for those cases where the pronunciation of a term is not known.)
2. It has been compiled with the aid of computers and lends itself to further development in electronic as well as printed form.
3. It makes use of the latest PRC lexicographical developments in respect to selection of terms and rules of orthography.
4. It utilizes frequency data from both the PRC and Taiwan to indicate the relative frequency of entries that are complete homographs (identical even as to tones) or partial homographs (identical except for tones) as an aid to student learning and computer inputting.
5. It presents a unique one-to-one correspondence between transcription and characters that permits calling up on computer the desired characters for any entry by simple uninterrupted typing of the corresponding transcription.
6. It introduces an innovative typographical format that enables its 71,486 entries (3,578 single-syllable and 68,908 multi-syllable entries) to be packed into about one-sixth less space than would be required by conventional dictionaries, while still providing greater legibility, in part thanks to larger characters. The result is a handy portable work that contains an unparalleled number of entries for its size.

The main source for ABC Dictionary entries is the 1989 edition of Hanyu Pinyin Cihui 汉語拼音詞汇 "Hanyu Pinyin Romanized Lexicon", a semi-official wordlist of 60,400 entries (without definitions) compiled by members of the China State Language Commission. Focusing upon the needs of Western students of Chinese, DeFrancis and the editors eliminated some terms and added others. Their dictionary includes many neologisms such as dàgēdà 大哥大 "cellular phone" or dǎo(r)yé 倒爷 "profiteer; speculator", as well as the modern Chinese practice of incorporating the Latin alphabet in coining Sino-alphabetic words like BP-jī BP机 "pager; beeper".

In contrast to most Chinese–English dictionaries, DeFrancis' emphasizes multisyllabic cí "words" rather than monosyllabic zì "characters". It only includes monosyllabic character entries that are likely to be encountered as free forms or unbound morphemes (according to the Xiandai Hanyu Pinlü Cidian 现代汉语频率词典 "Frequency Dictionary of Contemporary Chinese").

Chinese word frequency is an important aspect of the ABC Dictionary, and it lists homophones according to their decreasing occurrence. Frequency orders are based largely on Xiandai Hanyu Pinlü Cidian for monosyllabic entries and Zhongwen Shumianyu Pinlü Cidian 中文书面语频率词典 "Dictionary of the Chinese Written Language" for polysyllabic words. For entries with identical spelling, including tones, arrangement is by order of frequency, indicated by a superscript number before the transcription, a device adapted from Western lexicographic practice to distinguish homonyms. For example, "^{1}dàomù 盜墓 vo. rob graves" and "^{2}dàomù 道木 n. railway sleeper [tie]". For entries that are homographic if tones are disregarded, the item of highest usage frequency is indicated by an asterisk following the transcription (see a* 啊 above), for instance, "lìguǐ 厉鬼 n. ferocious ghost" and "lìguì* 立柜 n. clothes-closet; wardrobe; hanging cupboard". While frequency information is useful for students learning vocabulary, the ABC Dictionary chiefly provides it in order to help determine the default items in computer usage. "Our unique combination of letters, tone marks, and raised numbers provides a simple and distinctive one-to-one correspondence between transcription and character(s) that is intended to facilitate computerized handling of the entries."

The ABC Dictionary format for entries is:

- the pinyin spelling of the word in large boldface type
- the corresponding simplified Chinese characters, and for single-character entries with a contrasting traditional Chinese character, it is given in square brackets given upon the first appearance of each character/morpheme (e.g., "**wà** 袜[襪] **n.** socks; stockings; hose")
- parts of speech in boldface small caps (e.g., **vp.** verb phrase, **on.** onomatopoeia), which is especially useful for Western students of Chinese (e.g., "**huǎnghū** 恍惚 **adj./adv.** ① absentminded ② dimly; faintly; seemingly")
- (optional) usage environments (e.g., TW Taiwan) or registers (vulg. vulgar) in angle brackets and italics, for instance, "**húlǔ** 胡虏 **n.** ⟨derog.⟩ northern barbarians"
- translation equivalents in Roman type (e.g., "**huàngdang** 晃荡 **v.** rock; shake; sway"); semicolons separate slightly variant meanings of entries, and circled numbers distinguish more widely different meanings (as in **huǎnghū** above)
- (optional) example phrases and sentences in semi-bold italicized pinyin, but without characters, which users can find through alphabetic lookup, followed by English renderings in Roman type (e.g., "**^{1}tóutòng** 头痛 **v.** have a headache **Zhè shì zhēn ràng rén ~!** This gives one a real headache!")

Take the dao in Daoism for an example dictionary entry.

^{2}dào 道 ① road ② channel ③ way ④ doctrine ⑤ Daoism ⑥ line ♦ m. for rivers/topics/etc. ♦ v. ① say; speak; talk chángyán dào as the saying goes Tā shuō ~: "..." He said: "..." ② think; suppose (1996: 113)

This concise entry uses a superscript on dào to denote 道 as the second most commonly occurring unbound character pronounced dào, gives six English translation equivalents, distinguishes syntactic uses as a measure word and a verb, and gives two characterless usage examples chángyán dào 常言道 and Tā shuōdào 他說道.

=== Indication of tone change in pinyin spelling ===
Tone sandhi (tone change) is usually not reflected in pinyin spelling — the underlying tone (i.e. the original tone before the sandhi) is still written. However, ABC English–Chinese, Chinese–English Dictionary (2010) uses the following notation to indicate both the original tone and the tone after the sandhi:

1. 一 (yī) pronounced in second tone (yí) is written as yị̄. (Note: Due to a bug in some fonts, a tittle (overdot) may be displayed in ị̄ and ị̌. They should be displayed without the tittle (i.e. ī or ǐ with a dot below), like they appear in the cited dictionary.)
  - e.g. 一共 (underlying yīgòng, realized as yígòng) is written as yị̄gòng
2. 一 (yī) pronounced in fourth tone (yì) is written as yī̠.
  - e.g. 一起 (underlying yīqǐ, realized as yìqǐ) is written as yī̠qǐ
3. 不 (bù) pronounced in second tone (bú) is written as bụ̀.
  - e.g. 不要 (underlying bùyào, realized as búyào) is written as bụ̀yào
4. When there are two consecutive third-tone syllables, the first syllable is pronounced in second tone. A dot is added below to the third tone pronounced in second tone (i.e. written as ạ̌/Ạ̌, ẹ̌/Ẹ̌, ị̌, ọ̌/Ọ̌, ụ̌, and ụ̈̌).
  - e.g. 了解 (underlying liǎojiě, realized as liáojiě) is written as liạ̌ojiě

Wenlin Software for learning Chinese also adopted this notation.

== Reception ==
Reviews of DeFrancis' ABC Chinese–English Dictionary were published by major academic journals in linguistics (e.g., The Modern Language Journal), Asian studies (Journal of the Royal Asiatic Society), and sinology (China Review International). Most reviewers criticized certain aspects, such as the difficulty of looking up a traditional Chinese character, but also highly evaluated the innovative dictionary.

Here are three representative examples of praise: "the most extraordinary Chinese–English dictionary I have ever had such pleasure to look Chinese words up in and to read their English definitions"; "The thorough scholarship and fresh outlook make it a valuable contribution to Chinese lexicography, while the high production standards and comprehensive coverage of the colloquial language should make it a favourite of all serious students of Modern Chinese"; "This excellent one-volume Chinese–English dictionary is a crowning achievement for John DeFrancis, one of the doyens of Chinese language teaching in the United States".

A common area of complaint involves the ABC Dictionary's treatment of traditional and simplified Chinese characters. Dictionary entries give simplified characters for headwords, and only give the traditional form upon the first appearance of each character, and in the appendices. For instance, critics say, "looking up characters in traditional form is a bit more trouble than it might be, you must use a special index"; and the dictionary is "clearly not designed to be used by anyone who does serious work with nonsimplified characters".

One reviewer panned the ABC Dictionary's supplementary materials. For instance, saying the front matter's "uncommonly profuse" dedication and Editor's Call to Action reveal "no doubt that axes are being ground" about writing reform; the Distinctive Features of the Dictionary "reads like an abstract for a research grant application"; and describing most of the appendices as "a hodgepodge of pub quiz trivia".

Several evaluations of the ABC Chinese–English Dictionary mention cases in which using the alphabetically-arranged headword entries is more efficient than using a conventionally arranged dictionary with character head entries that list words written with that character as the first. Robert S. Bauer, a linguist of Cantonese at Hong Kong Polytechnic University says the dictionary works best when users hear a word pronounced but do not know how to write it in characters, they can very quickly look it up in pinyin order and find the correct characters and meanings. However, to look up an unknown character's pronunciation and meaning, then one needs to use a radical-indexed dictionary. Bauer says "I have generally succeeded in finding almost all the words and expressions I have tried to look up; this I regard as quite remarkable since I cannot say the same about other dictionaries I have been consulting over my more than 25 years of working on Chinese". Sean Jensen says alphabetical collation is "truly iconoclastic" in the tradition-rich world of Chinese lexicography and describes experimenting with using the dictionary.

I am used to the "old style" dictionaries based on radicals, and I was disposed to approach the ABC Dictionary with some skepticism. But having used it for two months I have so [sic] say that it is nothing short of wonderful! It is a pleasure to be able to use a Chinese dictionary in the same way that one uses a French or German dictionary. The typography is exceptionally clear, and the sheer quantity of words per page, arranged alphabetically, has the effect of bringing the melodies of spoken Chinese alive.

Michael Sawer, professor of Chinese at the University of Canberra, says using the ABC Dictionary does not make it easy to quickly find all the words beginning with the same Chinese character; but it does enable readers to easily find all those pronounced the same (disregarding tonal differences), as well as which among homophonous words is used most frequently.

Taking a contrary view, Karen Steffen Chung, professor of Chinese at National Taiwan University, found using DeFrancis' dictionary less satisfying than traditional dictionaries, where all compounds beginning with the same character are listed together under that character head entry. Giving the circular example of a hypothetical dictionary user wanting to find all the compounds beginning with shí 實 "to realize", which is certainly easier with a customary Chinese dictionary than with the ABC, Chung says that the alphabetic arrangement is unfortunately "its biggest drawback", and while "this may reflect an ideal of treating Chinese primarily as a spoken rather than written language, it also goes against native habit and intuition".

Scott McGinnis, professor of Chinese at the University of Maryland, explains that users of the ABC Dictionary who are already familiar with written Chinese and dictionaries organized by character headings must "forget" what they know about the Mandarin syllabic inventory and focus strictly on the spelling. For some dictionary users, purely pinyin-dependent sequencing such as cuānzi 镩子 "ice pick" to cūbào 粗暴 "rude; rough; crude" and nǎngshí 曩时 "(written) in olden days; of yore" to nánguā 南瓜 "pumpkin" "may be at least initially confusing".

Jan W. Walls, professor of Chinese language and culture at Simon Fraser University, describes some minor oversights in the dictionary such as the "dīshì 的士 ⟨loan⟩ taxi" entry, which might imply the borrowing came directly from English, when it actually is a loanword from Cantonese dik^{1} si^{6} 的士 transcribing taxi. But this is a minor point, "merely meizhong-buzu 美中不足 (defined in ABC as 'blemish in sth. otherwise perfect') that should not detract from the great value of this important work ... which is quite likely to become a standard reference work for English-speaking students of Mandarin, and to remain so for quite some time".

The expanded 2003 ABC Dictionary had fewer academic reviews than the 1996 ABC Chinese–English Dictionary.

Michael Sawer, who also reviewed the original ABC Dictionary, calls this comprehensive dictionary an "outstanding contribution to the field, in many ways better than other comparable dictionaries". He makes comparisons between the ABC Chinese–English Comprehensive Dictionary (called "ABC") and two bilingual dictionaries aimed more at native speakers of Chinese who are learning English: the Han-Ying Da Cidian ("CED" Chinese–English Dictionary), and Xiandai Hanyu Cidian: Han-Ying Shuangyu ("CCD" Contemporary Chinese Dictionary).

The 2003 ABC, like the 1996 first edition, is arranged in strict single-sort alphabetical order, while both the CED and CCD are in double-sort alphabetic order—that is, the first syllables of each word are arranged in alphabetic order, and then within each tone category in order of different characters. Take for instance, dictionary users wanting to look up yìshi 意识 "consciousness; mentality". A user who knows the pronunciation begins with yì can search (in ascending number of strokes) through some eighty characters pronounced yì before finding 意, and then 意识; or a user who knows that yìshi is written 意识 can find 意 in the radical index, under the "heart radical" 心, then the 9 remaining strokes in 音, and find the page number for the 意 head entry. A great advantage of ABC is that you can immediately look up a word you have heard but whose exact tone, meaning, and characters are unknown to you. For yishi in all tonal combinations, this dictionary gives 46 different words, with 意识 easily found. What an ABC user cannot straightforwardly see (which of course they can in the other two dictionaries) is all the words listed beginning with yì 意.

ABC gives grammatical information with around 30 tags, including both parts of speech ("V." for verb) and other tags ("ID." for idiom). CED provides just 11 grammatical tags, while CCD only marks numerals and classifiers. The comprehensive grammatical tags in ABC are "a most valuable feature", especially for learners of Chinese, and many words have more than one grammatical function (e.g., xuéxí 学习 [學習] v. study; learn; emulate ◆ n. learning"). Another useful ABC grammatical tag is B.F. for "bound form" (as opposed to free form words, mentioned above), but this distinction is not usually indicated in PRC dictionaries such as CED and CCD.

Proper nouns receive a particularly ample treatment in ABC (especially compared with CED and CCD). These include people's names (e.g., some 15 beginning with the surname Lǐ 李, ranging from the famous poet Li Bai to the former PRC President Li Xiannian), names of automobiles (like Xiàlì 夏利 "Charade"), and many toponyms (Xiàwēiyí 夏威夷 "Hawaiʻi", spelled with the ʻokina).

Yanfang Tang, professor of Chinese at the College of William and Mary, says the ABC Chinese–English Comprehensive Dictionary "stands above its peers as one of the most comprehensive, informative, and useful tools in the study of and dealing with the Chinese language". This dictionary is a valuable asset for several types of users. Native speakers will particularly benefit from the "authentic and accurate English translations" of Chinese words and phrases, which are an improvement over sometimes "stiff and awkward" translations in previous Chinese–English dictionaries, which were edited predominantly by Anglophone native speakers of Chinese. Chinese–English translators, students of Chinese as a foreign language, and compilers of Chinese language textbooks will find this dictionary indispensable for providing comprehensive linguistic information. Nonnative speakers of Chinese will find the dictionary handy to use, and those who are accustomed to alphabets will find locating a Chinese word in this alphabetically arranged dictionary "almost an act of second nature". Advanced learners of Chinese who have a firm command of pinyin will also benefit, especially in cases when they know how to pronounce a word but do not remember how to write it, and will be able to quickly find the character.

Tang suggests an improvement for future ABC Dictionary editions. Users who want to look up an unfamiliar character may find the layout of Stroke-Order Index and Radical Index to be "awkward, inconvenient, and time-consuming" because after looking the character up, the index gives the pinyin pronunciation instead of the page.

== Editions ==
- DeFrancis, John, ed. (1996). ABC Chinese–English Dictionary. University of Hawaiʻi Press.
- ABC Chinese–English Dictionary: Pocket edition (1999).
- ABC Chinese–English Dictionary: Desk reference edition (2000).
- ABC Chinese–English Comprehensive Dictionary. University of Hawaiʻi Press. 2003. ISBN 9780824827663.
- ABC English–Chinese, Chinese–English Dictionary. University of Hawaiʻi Press. 2010. ISBN 9780824834852.
