= Wenlin Software for learning Chinese =

Language learning software application

Wenlin
- Original author(s): Tom Bishop
- Developer(s): Tom Bishop and others
- Initial release: 1997
- Stable release: 4.3.2 / July 23, 2016; 8 years ago
- Written in: C
- Operating system: (version 4.x) Mac OS X, Windows, Windows Mobile; (version 3.x) Mac OS 9, Mac OS X, Windows; (version 2.x) Mac OS classic, Windows, DOS, (version 1.x) Mac OS classic, DOS
- Available in: English
- License: Proprietary
- Website: www.wenlin.com

Wenlin Software for Learning Chinese (Chinese: 文林; pinyin: Wénlín; lit. 'Literature forest') is a software application designed by Tom Bishop, who is also president of the Wenlin Institute. It is based on his experience of the needs of learners of the Chinese language, predominantly Mandarin. It contains a dictionary function, a corpus of Chinese texts, a function for reading and creating Chinese text files, and a flashcard function. By pointing the cursor at a Chinese character the software looks up an English word, and vice versa, working like a dictionary. The software recognizes files in Unicode, GB 2312, Big5, and HZ format.

== Functions ==
=== Dictionary function ===
The dictionary contains an electronic version of the ABC Chinese–English Dictionary by John DeFrancis and the Shuowen Jiezi seal character dictionary. The current version (4.3.2) contains more than 300,000 Chinese-English entries and over 60,000 English-Chinese entries. It allows users to search for Chinese characters or words by inputting either Chinese characters or pinyin using a variety of input options, including handwriting recognition. Users can update existing entries and add new entries to the dictionary. The program can also be extended with additional data modules, such as the ABC Etymological Dictionary of Old Chinese.

Unlike most electronic Chinese dictionaries, characters in Wenlin are defined in terms of the Character Description Language (CDL), an XML specification for describing complex glyphs in East Asian language, developed by the Wenlin Institute. This allows the program to define characters and character variants that are not defined in existing character sets such as Unicode. Version 4.3.2 of Wenlin covers more than 80,000 Chinese characters, including many rare characters.

=== List function ===
The software allows the user to display lists of Chinese characters ordered by pinyin, stroke count, frequency, components, or Unicode. It also displays lists of words by pinyin, frequency, and serial number. English words can be displayed alphabetically, as well as the 214 radicals of the Chinese language.

=== Corpus and text function ===
The paid version of the software comes with a small corpus of largely Classical Chinese texts. The software also allows users to open text files in a variety of Chinese character encodings.

== Development and versioning ==
Wenlin Software for Learning Chinese is developed and sold by the Wenlin Institute, a Social Purpose Corporation for Chinese and English language education, with Tom Bishop as President. The current paid version of the software, called the DELUXE Edition (Chinese: 文林完整版; pinyin: Wénlín Wánzhěngbǎn), is 4.3.2. Wenlin Institute also offers a free 4.2.1 version, called the Free Edition (Chinese: 文林免費版; pinyin: Wénlín Miǎnfèibǎn).

== Discussions of Wenlin ==
- Pinyin News entry for Wenlin 4.0
- SinoSplice review of Wenlin 4
- Screencast: Wenlin helps you read Chinese, review of Wenlin 3.3.6 by Stian Håklev
- Wenlin 3.0 review, CALICO Journal, Volume 21 Number 2, pp. 441–448
- Wenlin 1.0 review by Cecilia P. Y. Chu (UC Berkeley)
- CALL for Chinese: Issues and Practice, article (2002 JCLTA 37.2:1-58) by Zheng-sheng Zhang (San Diego State University), comparison of 10 programs including Wenlin 1.0
