= List of Frequently Used Characters in Modern Chinese =

Standard list of Chinese characters

The List of Frequently Used Characters in Modern Chinese (simplified Chinese: 现代汉语常用字表; traditional Chinese: 現代漢語常用字表; pinyin: Xiàndài Hànyǔ Chángyòngzì Biǎo) is a list of 3,500 frequently used Chinese characters, which are further divided into two levels: 2,500 frequently used characters and 1,000 less frequently used characters. According to experimental results, the coverage rate of the first-level characters is 97.97%, and the coverage rate of the second-level characters is 1.51%, totaling 99.48%.

The List of Frequently Used Characters in Modern Chinese was developed by the department of Chinese characters of the State Language Commission and was jointly released by the State Language Commission and the National Education Committee of the People's Republic of China in 1988, together with the List of Commonly Used Characters in Modern Chinese (现代汉语通用字表, of 7,000 characters, including the 3,500 characters in the previous list).

In 2013, the List of Commonly Used Standard Chinese Characters (通用规范汉字表) replaced the previous two lists as the new standard for Chinese characters in the People's Republic of China.
