= Zhonghua Zihai =

Chinese character dictionary

Zhonghua Zihai (simplified Chinese: 中华字海; traditional Chinese: 中華字海; pinyin: Zhōnghuá Zìhǎi) is the largest Chinese character dictionary available for print, compiled in 1994 and consisting of 85,568 different characters.

== Details ==
The Zhonghua Zihai consists of two parts; the first section consists of characters covered in earlier dictionaries, such as the Shuowen Jiezi, Yupian, Guangyun, Jiyun, Kangxi Dictionary and Zhonghua Da Zidian, which covers just under 50,000 individual characters. The second portion of the Zhonghua Zihai contains characters missed by previous dictionaries, as a result of manual error or due to lack of knowledge of such characters. Among these are included complex characters hidden in old Buddhist texts, rare characters found within the Dunhuang manuscripts, characters used during the Song, Yuan, Ming and Qing Dynasties that fell from use, dialectal characters, newly created characters as a result of advancement in science and technology (such as the Chinese character for the element Darmstadtium, 鐽, which is not present in prior dictionaries), as well as rare characters used today in personal and location names. Additionally, regional characters and variant characters from Taiwan, Hong Kong, Macau and Singapore, as well as non-native characters from Japanese Kanji and Korean Hanja, are also listed in the Zhonghua Zihai. All characters listed are in the Kaishu script.

One of the authors, Hu Mingyang, wrote in the preface of the Zhonghua Zihai stating that the problem regarding Chinese characters is that there is an exceedingly large number of them, which makes compilation very difficult, and a complete dictionary practically impossible due to the large number of variant characters and those that are unknown.

== Development ==
The foundation in which the compilation of characters was undertaken are as follows:

1. The copying of characters found in dictionaries from past dynasties, for the collection of those characters already listed in some published volume.
2. The analysis of documents and literature from past dynasties for previously unlisted characters.
3. The inclusion of all Simplified Chinese characters introduced by the government of the People's Republic of China, already listed in the "Complete List of Simplified Characters" (Chinese: 简化字总表; pinyin: jiǎn huà zì zǒng biǎo) announced in 1986.
4. The analysis of Oracle bone script and Bronze script texts, as well as historic silk writings, for comparative purposes in the decision process for accepting characters.
5. The comparison of Variant Chinese characters from past dynasties found in stone engravings (where characters with minimal variation are generally not accepted in the final listing).
6. The analysis of local documents and that of regional dialects, such as dialectal dictionaries.
7. The inclusion of newly created characters associated with modern concepts, such as those arising from new scientific and technological developments.
8. The analysis of characters used in proper nouns, such as the names of locations and characters used in personal names.
9. The analysis of modern publications which may include unofficial or informal character simplifications, in which they may not be present in the PRC government "Complete List of Simplified Characters" (a similar example of this would be Ryakuji).
10. The inclusion of characters from the failed simplified character reform in 1977 to introduce the Second-round simplified Chinese characters, taken from the draft of the proposed bill.
11. The inclusion of rare variants and popular regional characters from areas such as Hong Kong, Macau and Taiwan, plus the unique characters in use in Japan and Korea but not within China.

== Other dictionaries ==
The previous character dictionary published in China was the Hanyu Da Zidian, introduced in 1989, which contained 54,678 characters. In Japan, the 2003 edition of the Dai Kan-Wa jiten has some 51,109 characters, while the Han-Han Dae Sajeon completed in South Korea in 2008 contains 53,667 Chinese characters (the project having lasted 30 years, at a cost of 31,000,000,000 KRW or US$25 million).

The Dictionary of Chinese Variant Form (Chinese: 異體字字典; pinyin: yìtǐzì zìdiǎn) compiled by the Taiwan (ROC) Ministry of Education in 2004 contains 106,230 individual characters, many being variants.

== Publications ==
- 1st edition (Zhonghua Zihai) (ISBN 978-7-5057-0630-9): Includes 85568 entries.

- 1st impression (1994-09-01)

== See also ==
- Chinese character
- Hanyu Da Zidian
- Kangxi Dictionary
- Dai Kan-Wa jiten
- Han-Han Dae Sajeon
