= CJK Unified Ideographs =

Encoding for shared Han characters

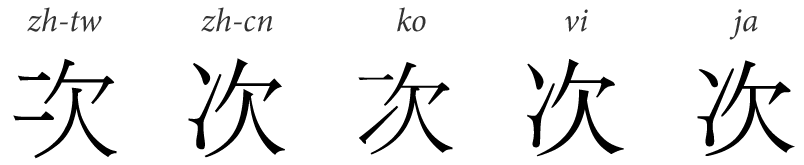
CJKV character 次 (U+6B21) in traditional and simplified Chinese, Korean, Vietnamese and Japanese forms

The Chinese, Japanese and Korean (also known as CJK) scripts share a common background, collectively known as CJK characters. During the process called Han unification, the common (shared) characters were identified and named CJK Unified Ideographs. As of Unicode 18.0, Unicode defines a total of 101,997 characters.

The term ideographs is a misnomer, as the Chinese script is not ideographic but rather logographic, but was chosen for being more common in English.

Until the early 20th century, Vietnam also used Chinese characters (Chữ Nôm), so sometimes the abbreviation CJKV is used.

== Sources ==
The Ideographic Research Group (IRG) is responsible for developing extensions to the encoded repertoires of CJK unified ideographs. IRG processes proposals for new CJK unified ideographs submitted by its member bodies, and after undergoing several rounds of expert review, IRG submits a consolidated set of characters to ISO/IEC JTC 1/SC 2 Working Group 2 (WG2) and the Unicode Technical Committee (UTC) for consideration for inclusion in the ISO/IEC 10646 and Unicode standards. The following IRG member bodies have been involved in the standardization of CJK unified ideographs:

- China
- Hong Kong
- Japan
- North Korea
- South Korea
- Macau
- Taiwan, liaison member represented by the Taipei Computer Association (TCA)
- Vietnam
- Unicode Technical Committee (liaison member, also representing the United States)
- United Kingdom
- SAT Daizōkyō Text Database Committee (liaison member)

The ideographs submitted by the UTC and the United Kingdom are not specific to any particular region, but are characters which have been suggested for encoding by individual experts. The ideographs submitted by SAT are required for the SAT Daizōkyō text database.

The table below gives the numbers of encoded CJK unified ideographs for each IRG source for Unicode . The total number of characters (268,454) far exceeds the number of encoded CJK unified ideographs (101,997) as many characters have more than one source.

CJK unified ideographs by source
Member	Character count
China	70,262
Hong Kong	17,655
Japan	52,560
North Korea	23,976
South Korea	21,358
Macau	344
Taiwan	59,734
United Kingdom	3,409
Vietnam	14,276
SAT	3,715
UTC	1,164
Total	268,454

=== UTC sources ===
The majority of characters submitted by the UTC to the IRG are derived from Unicode Technical Committee (UTC) documents. Other sources include:

- ABC Chinese-English Dictionary by John DeFrancis
- The Adobe-CNS1 glyph collection
- The Adobe-Japan1 glyph collection
- A Complete Checklist of Species and Subspecies of Chinese Birds (中国鸟类系统检索)
- The Great Nom Dictionary (Đại Tự Điển Chữ Nôm)
- Annotations to Shuowen Jiezi (annotated by Duan Yucai)
- GB18030-2000
- Required Character List Supplied by the Church of Jesus Christ of Latter-day Saints (Hong Kong)
- Commercial Press New Dictionary (商務新詞典), Hong Kong
- Xiandai Hanyu Cidian (现代汉语词典), by Chinese Academy of Social Sciences, Linguistics Research Institute, Dictionary Editorial Office
- Working Group (WG2) documents

== Ordering ==
The ordering of CJK Unified Ideographs within Unicode blocks (not counting those added to the block later) was initially determined by consulting the following four dictionaries. Primarily, they were arranged in Kangxi Dictionary order, with the other dictionaries consulted, in order, for characters not found in the Kangxi Dictionary, to determine which Kangxi Dictionary character they should follow in the ordering.

1. Kangxi Dictionary
2. Dai Kan-Wa Jiten
3. Hanyu Da Zidian
4. Dae Jaweon

This system is not used for more recently-added Unicode blocks. The Ideographic Research Group no longer uses the Dae Jaweon, nor the Dai Kan-Wa Jiten, in its work. The Kangxi Dictionary and Hanyu Da Zidian are still used both in existing character source references, and as potential replacements for existing source references discovered to be erroneous. Similarly, although a (real or virtual) Kangxi Dictionary index was previously provided as part of the submission data for UTC-source characters, this is no longer the case. Instead, the stroke type of the first residual stroke (first stroke which does not form part of the radical) is supplied with all submitted characters, and used to order characters with the same radical and stroke count within the new Unicode block.

== CJK Unified Ideographs blocks ==
=== CJK Unified Ideographs ===
The basic block named CJK Unified Ideographs (4E00–9FFF) contains 20,992 basic Chinese characters in the range U+4E00 through U+9FFF. The block not only includes characters used in the Chinese writing system but also kanji used in the Japanese writing system, hanja in Korea, and chữ Nôm characters in Vietnamese. Many characters in this block are used in all three writing systems, while others are in only one or two of the three.

This block is also known as the Unified Repertoire and Ordering (URO), especially when it needs to be differentiated from the other CJK Unified Ideographs blocks.

The first 20,902 characters in the block are arranged according to the Kangxi Dictionary ordering of radicals. In this system the characters written with the fewest strokes are listed first. The remaining characters were added later, and so are not in radical order.

The block is the result of Han unification, which was somewhat controversial within East Asia. Since single characters used in more than one of Chinese, Japanese and Korean were coded in the same location, and the modern typographical conventions and handwriting curricula differ slightly between regions (not necessarily along language boundaries—for example, Hong Kong and Taiwan, which both use Traditional Chinese, have slightly different local conventions), the appearance of a selected glyph could depend on the particular font being used. However, the URO applies the source separation rule, meaning that pairs of characters treated as distinct in a character set used as a source for the URO (e.g. JIS X 0208 as used in e.g. Shift JIS) would remain pairs of separate characters in the new Unicode encoding.

Using variation selectors, it is possible to specify certain variant CJK ideograms within Unicode. The Adobe-Japan1 character set, which has 14,684 ideographic variation sequences, is an extreme example of the use of variation selectors.

==== Charts ====
4E00–62FF, 6300–77FF, 7800–8CFF, 8D00–9FFF.

==== Sources ====
Note: Most characters appear in multiple sources, so the sum of individual character counts (108,493) is far greater than the number of encoded characters (20,992).

Member	Code	Source	Character count	Total
China	G0	GB/T 2312–1980 (formerly GB 2312–80)	6,763	20,939
China	G1	GB/T 12345-1990 (formerly GB/T 12345–90); Traditional Chinese analogue to GB 2312–80	2,202	20,939
China	G3	GB/T 13131 (unpublished GB/T 7589–1987 unsimplified forms)	4,832	20,939
China	G5	GB/T 13132 (unpublished GB/T 7590–1987 unsimplified forms)	2,844	20,939
China	G7	General Purpose Hanzi List for Modern Chinese Language, and General List of Simplified Hanzi	42	20,939
China	G8	GB/T 8565.2–1988 (formerly GB 8565.2–88)	203	20,939
China	GCA	Culture and Art Publishing House Ideographs (文化艺术出版社用字)	7	20,939
China	GCE	Names of newly-discovered chemical elements as assigned by the China National Committee for Terms in Sciences and Technologies and the China National Language and Character Working Committee (全国科学技术名词审定委员会，国家语言文字工作委员会)	4	20,939
China	GCESI	Characters collected by China Electronics Standardization Institute (中国电子技术标准化研究院)	3	20,939
China	GDM	Place name characters from the Public Order Administration, Ministry of Public Security of the People's Republic of China	2	20,939
China	GE	GB/T 16500-1998	3,763	20,939
China	GFC	Modern Chinese Standard Dictionary (现代汉语规范词典第二版)	2	20,939
China	GGFZ	Tongyong Guifan Hanzi Zidian (通用规范汉字字典)	7	20,939
China	GGT	Characters collected by the National Library of China	1	20,939
China	GH	GB/T 15564-1995	59	20,939
China	GHZ	Hanyu Da Zidian	1	20,939
China	GHZR	Hanyu Da Zidian 2nd ed. (汉语大字典, 第二版)	29	20,939
China	GK	GB/T 12052-1989 (formerly GB 12052–89)	89	20,939
China	GKJ	Terms in Sciences and Technologies approved by the China National Committee for Terms in Sciences and Technologies (CNCTST)	16	20,939
China	GKX	Kangxi Dictionary	44	20,939
China	GLK	Longkan Shoujian	1	20,939
China	GT	Standard Telegraph Codebook (revised), 1983	16	20,939
China	GU	No source (the original source reference has been moved or removed)	7	20,939
China	GWY	Cultural Heritage Ideographs (文化遗产用字)	1	20,939
China	GZFY	Hanyu Fangyan Dacidian (汉语方言大词典)	1	20,939
Hong Kong	H	Hong Kong Supplementary Character Set, 2008	2,292	15,376
Hong Kong	HB0	Computer Chinese Glyph and Character Code Mapping Table, Technical Report C-26 (電腦用中文字型與字碼對照表, 技術通報C-26)	9	15,376
Hong Kong	HB1	Big-5, Level 1	5,401	15,376
Hong Kong	HB2	Big-5, Level 2	7,650	15,376
Hong Kong	HD	Hong Kong Supplementary Character Set, 2016	24	15,376
Japan	J0	JIS X 0208-1990	6,356	18,249
Japan	J1	JIS X 0212-1990	3,058	18,249
Japan	J13	JIS X 0213:2004 level-3 characters replacing J1 characters	1,037	18,249
Japan	J13A	JIS X 0213:2004 level-3 character addendum from JIS X 0213:2000 level-3 replacing J1 character	2	18,249
Japan	J14	JIS X 0213:2004 level-4 characters replacing J1 characters	1,704	18,249
Japan	J3	JIS X 0213:2004 Level 3	95	18,249
Japan	J3A	JIS X 0213:2004 Level 3 addendum from JIS X 0213:2000 Level 3	7	18,249
Japan	J4	JIS X 0213:2004 Level 4	301	18,249
Japan	JARIB	ARIB STD-B24 Version 5.1, March 14 2007	3	18,249
Japan	JMJ	Character Information Development and Maintenance Project for e-Government "MojiJoho-Kiban Project" (文字情報基盤整備事業)	5,686	18,249
North Korea	KP0	KPS 9566–97	4,652	15,007
North Korea	KP1	KPS 10721-2000	10,355	15,007
South Korea	K0	KS X 1001:2004 (formerly KS C 5601–1987)	4,620	15,450
South Korea	K1	KS X 1002:2001 (formerly KS C 5657–1991)	2,855	15,450
South Korea	K2	KS X 1027–1:2011 (formerly PKS C 5700–1 1994)	7,911	15,450
South Korea	K3	KS X 1027–2:2011 (formerly PKS C 5700–2 1994)	1	15,450
South Korea	K4	KS X 1027–3:2011 (formerly PKS 5700–3:1998)	4	15,450
South Korea	K6	KS X 1027–5:2021	57	15,450
South Korea	KC	Korean History On-Line (한국 역사 정보 통합 시스템)	1	15,450
South Korea	KU	No source (the original source reference has been moved)	1	15,450
Macau	MA	HKSCS-2008	29	200
Macau	MB1	Big Five	10	200
Macau	MB2	Big Five	7	200
Macau	MC	Macau Supplementary Character Set (MSCS) reference	3	200
Macau	MD	Macau Supplementary Character Set (MSCS) horizontal extensions	127	200
Macau	MDH	HKSCS-2016	24	200
Taiwan	T1	CNS 11643-1986 plane 1	5,413	18,385
Taiwan	T2	CNS 11643-1986 plane 2	7,651	18,385
Taiwan	T3	CNS 11643-1992 plane 3	4,145	18,385
Taiwan	T4	CNS 11643-1992 plane 4	893	18,385
Taiwan	T5	CNS 11643-1992 plane 5	64	18,385
Taiwan	T6	CNS 11643-1992 plane 6	31	18,385
Taiwan	T7	CNS 11643-1992 plane 7	16	18,385
Taiwan	TB	CNS 11643-2007 plane 11	2	18,385
Taiwan	TC	CNS 11643-2007 plane 12	2	18,385
Taiwan	TE	CNS 11643-2007 plane 14	9	18,385
Taiwan	TF	CNS 11643-2007 plane 15	159	18,385
Vietnam	V0	TCVN 5773:1993	598	4,808
Vietnam	V1	TCVN 6056:1995	3,305	4,808
Vietnam	V2	VHN 01–1998	759	4,808
Vietnam	V3	VHN 02–1998	91	4,808
Vietnam	V4	Hán Nôm Coded Character Repertoire (Kho Chữ Hán Nôm Mã Hoá)	19	4,808
Vietnam	VN	Vietnamese horizontal and vertical extensions	36	4,808
N/A	UTC	UTC sources	79	79

In Unicode 4.1, 14 HKSCS-2004 characters and 8 GB 18030 characters were assigned to between U+9FA6 and U+9FBB code points. Since then, other additions were added to this block for various reasons, all summarized in the version history section below.

=== CJK Unified Ideographs Extension A ===
The block named CJK Unified Ideographs Extension A (3400–4DBF) contains 6,592 additional characters in the range U+3400 through U+4DBF.

==== Charts ====
3400–4DBF.

==== Sources ====
Note: Most characters appear in more than one source, so the sum of individual character counts (24,010) is far greater than the number of encoded characters (6,592).

Member	Code	Source	Character count	Total
China	G3	GB/T 13131 (unpublished GB/T 7589–1987 unsimplified forms)	2,390	6,242
China	G4K	Siku Quanshu (四庫全書)	2	6,242
China	G5	GB/T 13132 (unpublished GB/T 7590–1987 unsimplified forms)	1,228	6,242
China	G7	General Purpose Hanzi List for Modern Chinese Language, and General List of Simplified Hanzi	36	6,242
China	GCA	Culture and Art Publishing House Ideographs	27	6,242
China	GCESI	Characters collected by China Electronics Standardization Institute (中国电子技术标准化研究院)	8	6,242
China	GDM	Place name characters from the Public Order Administration, Ministry of Public Security of the People's Republic of China	9	6,242
China	GGFZ	Tongyong Guifan Hanzi Zidian	3	6,242
China	GHZ	Hanyu Da Zidian	344	6,242
China	GHZR	Hanyu Da Zidian 2nd ed.	20	6,242
China	GKJ	Terms in Sciences and Technologies approved by the China National Committee for Terms in Sciences and Technologies (CNCTST)	3	6,242
China	GKX	Kangxi Dictionary	1,906	6,242
China	GS	Singapore Chinese characters (Note: Characters presumably intended for Singapore Chinese characters, but apparently an ad hoc collection rather than a Singapore national standard.)	225	6,242
China	GU	No source (the original source reference has been moved or removed)	3	6,242
China	GWY	Cultural Heritage Ideographs	1	6,242
China	GXM	Characters for use in personal names in China from Public Order Administration, Ministry of Public Security of the People's Republic of China	6	6,242
China	GZ	Ancient Zhuang Character Dictionary	12	6,242
China	GZH	Zhonghua Zihai (中华字海)	17	6,242
Hong Kong	H	Hong Kong Supplementary Character Set, 2008	572	572
Hong Kong	HD	Hong Kong Supplementary Character Set, 2016	1	572
Japan	J3	JIS X 0213:2004 Level 3	2	5,856
Japan	J4	JIS X 0213:2004 Level 4	78	5,856
Japan	JA	Japanese IT Vendors Contemporary Ideographs, 1993	574	5,856
Japan	JA3	JIS X 0213:2004 level-3 characters replacing JA characters	17	5,856
Japan	JA4	JIS X 0213:2004 level-4 characters replacing JA characters	67	5,856
Japan	JMJ	Character Information Development and Maintenance Project for e-Government "MojiJoho-Kiban Project"	5,118	5,856
North Korea	KP0	KPS 9566–97	1	3,191
North Korea	KP1	KPS 10721-2000	3,190	3,191
South Korea	K3	KS X 1027–2:2011 (formerly PKS C 5700–2 1994)	1,833	1,876
South Korea	K4	KS X 1027–3:2011 (formerly PKS 5700–3:1998)	2	1,876
South Korea	K6	KS X 1027–5:2021	37	1,876
South Korea	KC	Korean History On-Line	3	1,876
South Korea	KU	No source (the original source reference has been moved)	1	1,876
Macau	MA	HKSCS-2008	4	12
Macau	MD	Macau Supplementary Character Set (MSCS) horizontal extensions	8	12
Taiwan	T3	CNS 11643-1992 plane 3	2,179	5,917
Taiwan	T4	CNS 11643-1992 plane 4	2,920	5,917
Taiwan	T5	CNS 11643-1992 plane 5	399	5,917
Taiwan	T6	CNS 11643-1992 plane 6	200	5,917
Taiwan	T7	CNS 11643-1992 plane 7	135	5,917
Taiwan	TB	CNS 11643-2007 plane 11	1	5,917
Taiwan	TE	CNS 11643-2007 plane 14	1	5,917
Taiwan	TF	CNS 11643-2007 plane 15	85	5,917
United Kingdom	UK	IRG N2107R2	3	3
Vietnam	V0	TCVN 5773:1993	140	319
Vietnam	V2	VHN 01–1998	149	319
Vietnam	V3	VHN 02–1998	19	319
Vietnam	V4	Hán Nôm Coded Character Repertoire	5	319
Vietnam	VN	Vietnamese horizontal and vertical extensions	6	319
N/A	UTC	UTC sources	21	21

=== CJK Unified Ideographs Extension B ===
The block named CJK Unified Ideographs Extension B (20000–2A6DF) contains 42,720 characters in the range U+20000 through U+2A6DF. These include most of the characters used in the Kangxi Dictionary that are not in the basic CJK Unified Ideographs block, as well as many Hán-Nôm characters that were formerly used to write Vietnamese.

==== Charts ====
20000–215FF, 21600–230FF, 23100–245FF, 24600–260FF, 26100–275FF, 27600–290FF, 29100–2A6DF.

==== Sources ====
Note: Many characters appear in more than one source, so the sum of individual character counts (101,041) is far greater than the number of encoded characters (42,720).

Member	Code	Source	Character count	Total
China	G3	GB/T 13131 (unpublished GB/T 7589–1987 unsimplified forms)	1	31,489
China	G4K	Siku Quanshu	489	31,489
China	GBK	Encyclopedia of China	59	31,489
China	GCA	Culture and Art Publishing House Ideographs	142	31,489
China	GCESI	Characters collected by China Electronics Standardization Institute (中国电子技术标准化研究院)	135	31,489
China	GCH	Cihai	234	31,489
China	GCY	Ciyuan	36	31,489
China	GDM	Place name characters from the Public Order Administration, Ministry of Public Security of the People's Republic of China	146	31,489
China	GFZ	Founder Press System (方正排版系统)	64	31,489
China	GGFZ	Tongyong Guifan Hanzi Zidian	6	31,489
China	GHC	Hanyu Da Cidian	499	31,489
China	GHF	Hanwen fodian yinan suzi huishi yu yanjiu (漢文佛典疑難俗字彙釋與研究)	2	31,489
China	GHZ	Hanyu Da Zidian	10,497	31,489
China	GHZR	Hanyu Da Zidian 2nd ed.	28	31,489
China	GKJ	Terms in Sciences and Technologies approved by the China National Committee for Terms in Sciences and Technologies (CNCTST)	17	31,489
China	GKX	Kangxi Dictionary	18,468	31,489
China	GU	No source (the original source reference has been moved or removed)	91	31,489
China	GWY	Cultural Heritage Ideographs	100	31,489
China	GXM	Characters for use in personal names in China from Public Order Administration, Ministry of Public Security of the People's Republic of China	17	31,489
China	GZ	Ancient Zhuang Character Dictionary (古壮字字典)	455	31,489
China	GZFY	Hanyu Fangyan Dacidian	3	31,489
Hong Kong	H	Hong Kong Supplementary Character Set, 2008	1,703	1,703
Japan	J3	JIS X 0213:2004 Level 3	25	25,745
Japan	J3A	JIS X 0213:2004 Level 3 addendum from JIS X 0213:2000 Level 3	1	25,745
Japan	J4	JIS X 0213:2004 Level 4	277	25,745
Japan	JMJ	Character Information Development and Maintenance Project for e-Government "MojiJoho-Kiban Project"	25,442	25,745
North Korea	KP1	KPS 10721-2000	5,767	5,767
South Korea	K1	KS X 1002:2001 (formerly KS C 5657–1991)	1	683
South Korea	K4	KS X 1027–3:2011 (formerly PKS 5700–3:1998)	166	683
South Korea	K6	KS X 1027–5:2021	502	683
South Korea	KC	Korean History On-Line	14	683
Macau	MA	HKSCS-2008	9	38
Macau	MC	Macau Supplementary Character Set (MSCS) reference	2	38
Macau	MD	Macau Supplementary Character Set (MSCS) horizontal extensions	27	38
Taiwan	T3	CNS 11643-1992 plane 3	29	30,216
Taiwan	T4	CNS 11643-1992 plane 4	3,408	30,216
Taiwan	T5	CNS 11643-1992 plane 5	8,115	30,216
Taiwan	T6	CNS 11643-1992 plane 6	5,942	30,216
Taiwan	T7	CNS 11643-1992 plane 7	6,299	30,216
Taiwan	TA	CNS 11643-2007 plane 10	13	30,216
Taiwan	TB	CNS 11643-2007 plane 11	9	30,216
Taiwan	TC	CNS 11643-2007 plane 12	1	30,216
Taiwan	TF	CNS 11643-2007 plane 15	6,400	30,216
United Kingdom	UK	IRG N2107R2	12	12
Vietnam	V0	TCVN 5773:1993	1,570	5,299
Vietnam	V1	TCVN 6056:1995	1	5,299
Vietnam	V2	VHN 01–1998	2,286	5,299
Vietnam	V3	VHN 02–1998	422	5,299
Vietnam	V4	Hán Nôm Coded Character Repertoire	33	5,299
Vietnam	VN	Vietnamese horizontal and vertical extensions	987	5,299
Buddhist canon	SAT	SAT Daizōkyō Text Database	1	1
N/A	UTC	UTC sources	88	88

=== CJK Unified Ideographs Extension C ===
The block named CJK Unified Ideographs Extension C (2A700–2B73F) contains 4,160 characters in the range U+2A700 through U+2B73F. It was initially added in Unicode 5.2 (2009).

==== Charts ====
2A700–2B73F.

==== Sources ====
Note: Some characters appear in more than one source, so the sum of individual character counts (4,986) is greater than the number of encoded characters (4,160).

Member	Code	Source	Character count	Total
China	GBK	Encyclopedia of China	74	1,474
China	GCA	Culture and Art Publishing House Ideographs	24	1,474
China	GCESI	Characters collected by China Electronics Standardization Institute	117	1,474
China	GCH	Cihai	264	1,474
China	GCY	Ciyuan	1	1,474
China	GCYY	Chinese Academy of Surveying and Mapping ideographs (中国测绘科学院用字)	55	1,474
China	GDM	Place name characters from the Public Order Administration, Ministry of Public Security of the People's Republic of China	83	1,474
China	GFZ	Founder Press System	1	1,474
China	GGFZ	Tongyong Guifan Hanzi Zidian	3	1,474
China	GGH	Gudai Hanyu Cidian (古代汉语词典)	50	1,474
China	GHC	Hanyu Da Cidian	14	1,474
China	GHZ	Hanyu Da Zidian	1	1,474
China	GHZR	Hanyu Da Zidian 2nd ed.	3	1,474
China	GJZ	Commercial Press ideographs (商务印书馆用字)	61	1,474
China	GKJ	Terms in Sciences and Technologies approved by the China National Committee for Terms in Sciences and Technologies (CNCTST)	8	1,474
China	GKX	Kangxi Dictionary	8	1,474
China	GWY	Cultural Heritage Ideographs	6	1,474
China	GXC	Xiandai Hanyu Cidian	23	1,474
China	GXM	Characters for use in personal names in China from Public Order Administration, Ministry of Public Security of the People's Republic of China	2	1,474
China	GZ	Ancient Zhuang Character Dictionary	109	1,474
China	GZFY	Hanyu Fangyan Dacidian	202	1,474
China	GZJW	Yin Zhou Jinwen Jicheng Yinde (殷周金文集成引得)	365	1,474
Hong Kong	H	Hong Kong Supplementary Character Set, 2008	1	1
Japan	JK	Japanese Kokuji Collection (Mojikyō subset)	367	431
Japan	JMJ	Character Information Development and Maintenance Project for e-Government "MojiJoho-Kiban Project"	64	431
North Korea	KP1	KPS 10721-2000	9	9
South Korea	K5	KS X 1027–4:2011 (formerly Korean IRG Hanja Character Set 5th Edition: 2001)	404	408
South Korea	K6	KS X 1027–5:2021	3	408
South Korea	KC	Korean History On-Line	1	408
Macau	MC	Macau Supplementary Character Set (MSCS) reference	17	21
Macau	MD	Macau Supplementary Character Set (MSCS) horizontal extensions	4	21
Taiwan	T4	CNS 11643-1992 plane 4	1	1,757
Taiwan	T5	CNS 11643-1992 plane 5	1	1,757
Taiwan	T6	CNS 11643-1992 plane 6	2	1,757
Taiwan	TB	CNS 11643-2007 plane 11	2	1,757
Taiwan	TC	CNS 11643-2007 plane 12	634	1,757
Taiwan	TD	CNS 11643-2007 plane 13	767	1,757
Taiwan	TE	CNS 11643-2007 plane 14	350	1,757
United Kingdom	UK	IRG N2107R2	1	1
Vietnam	V0	TCVN 5773:1993	4	795
Vietnam	V1	TCVN 6056:1995	2	795
Vietnam	V2	VHN 01–1998	1	795
Vietnam	V4	Hán Nôm Coded Character Repertoire	782	795
Vietnam	VN	Vietnamese horizontal and vertical extensions	6	795
N/A	UTC	UTC sources	89	89

=== CJK Unified Ideographs Extension D ===
The block named CJK Unified Ideographs Extension D (2B740–2B81F) contains 223 characters in the range U+2B740 through U+2B81E. It was originally added in Unicode 6.0 (2010).

==== Charts ====
2B740–2B81F.

==== Sources ====
Note: Some characters appear in more than one source, so the sum of individual character counts (271) is greater than the number of encoded characters (223).

Member	Code	Source	Character count	Total
China	GCA	Culture and Art Publishing House Ideographs	22	110
China	GCESI	Characters collected by China Electronics Standardization Institute	7	110
China	GCH	Cihai	1	110
China	GDM	Place name characters from the Public Order Administration, Ministry of Public Security of the People's Republic of China	1	110
China	GIDC	ID System of the Ministry of Public Security of China (公安人口信息专用字库补充汉字)	9	110
China	GKJ	Terms in Sciences and Technologies approved by the China National Committee for Terms in Sciences and Technologies (CNCTST)	2	110
China	GXC	Xiandai Hanyu Cidian	4	110
China	GXM	Characters for use in personal names in China from Public Order Administration, Ministry of Public Security of the People's Republic of China	22	110
China	GZ	Ancient Zhuang Character Dictionary	3	110
China	GZH	Zhonghua Zihai	39	110
Japan	JH	Hanyo-Denshi Program (汎用電子情報交換環境整備プログラム)	107	117
Japan	JMJ	Character Information Development and Maintenance Project for e-Government "MojiJoho-Kiban Project"	10	117
Taiwan	TB	CNS 11643-2007 plane 11	24	24
N/A	UTC	UTC sources	20	20

=== CJK Unified Ideographs Extension E ===
The block named CJK Unified Ideographs Extension E (2B820–2CEAF) contains 5,774 characters in the range U+2B820 through U+2CEAD. It was originally added in Unicode 8.0 (2015).

==== Charts ====
2B820–2CEAF.

==== Sources ====
Note: Some characters appear in more than one source, so the sum of individual character counts (6,340) is greater than the number of encoded characters (5,774).

Member	Code	Source	Character count	Total
China	G5	GB/T 13132 (unpublished GB/T 7590–1987 unsimplified forms)	1	3,240
China	GBK	Encyclopedia of China	11	3,240
China	GCA	Culture and Art Publishing House Ideographs	36	3,240
China	GCE	Names of newly-discovered chemical elements as assigned by the China National Committee for Terms in Sciences and Technologies and the China National Language and Character Working Committee (全国科学技术名词审定委员会，国家语言文字工作委员会)	4	3,240
China	GCESI	Characters collected by China Electronics Standardization Institute	209	3,240
China	GCH	Cihai	112	3,240
China	GCY	Ciyuan	1	3,240
China	GCYY	Chinese Academy of Surveying and Mapping ideographs	98	3,240
China	GDM	Place name characters from the Public Order Administration, Ministry of Public Security of the People's Republic of China	10	3,240
China	GDZ	Geographic Publishing House ideographs (地质出版社用字)	1	3,240
China	GGFZ	Tongyong Guifan Hanzi Zidian	4	3,240
China	GGH	Gudai Hanyu Cidian	175	3,240
China	GGT	Characters collected by the National Library of China	2	3,240
China	GHC	Hanyu Da Cidian (漢語大詞典)	3	3,240
China	GHZR	Hanyu Da Zidian 2nd ed. (汉语大字典, 第二版)	5	3,240
China	GIDC	ID System of the Ministry of Public Security of China	37	3,240
China	GJZ	Commercial Press ideographs	147	3,240
China	GKJ	Terms in Sciences and Technologies approved by the China National Committee for Terms in Sciences and Technologies (CNCTST)	3	3,240
China	GKX	Kangxi Dictionary	22	3,240
China	GRM	People's Daily ideographs (人民日报用字)	3	3,240
China	GU	No source (the original source reference has been moved or removed)	3	3,240
China	GWY	Cultural Heritage Ideographs	54	3,240
China	GWZ	Hanyu Da Cidian Press ideographs (漢語大詞典出版社用字)	12	3,240
China	GXC	Xiandai Hanyu Cidian	52	3,240
China	GXH	Xinhua Dictionary	4	3,240
China	GXM	Characters for use in personal names in China from Public Order Administration, Ministry of Public Security of the People's Republic of China	1	3,240
China	GZ	Ancient Zhuang Character Dictionary	107	3,240
China	GZFY	Hanyu Fangyan Dacidian	712	3,240
China	GZHSJ	Characters collected by the Zhonghua Book Company (中华书局)	1	3,240
China	GZJW	Yin Zhou Jinwen Jicheng Yinde	1,410	3,240
Hong Kong	HD	Hong Kong Supplementary Character Set, 2016	1	1
Japan	JK	Japanese Kokuji Collection (Mojikyō subset)	415	503
Japan	JMJ	Character Information Development and Maintenance Project for e-Government "MojiJoho-Kiban Project"	88	503
South Korea	KC	Korean History On-Line	7	7
Macau	MC	Macau Supplementary Character Set (MSCS) reference	48	51
Macau	MD	Macau Supplementary Character Set (MSCS) horizontal extensions	3	51
Taiwan	T3	CNS 11643-1992 plane 3	2	1,262
Taiwan	T5	CNS 11643-1992 plane 5	1	1,262
Taiwan	TB	CNS 11643-2007 plane 11	2	1,262
Taiwan	TC	CNS 11643-2007 plane 12	323	1,262
Taiwan	TD	CNS 11643-2007 plane 13	595	1,262
Taiwan	TE	CNS 11643-2007 plane 14	339	1,262
United Kingdom	UK	IRG N2107R2	2	2
Vietnam	V0	TCVN 5773:1993	7	1,037
Vietnam	V2	VHN 01–1998	1	1,037
Vietnam	V4	Hán Nôm Coded Character Repertoire	1,023	1,037
Vietnam	VN	Vietnamese horizontal and vertical extensions	6	1,037
N/A	UTC	UTC sources	237	237

=== CJK Unified Ideographs Extension F ===
The block named CJK Unified Ideographs Extension F (2CEB0–2EBEF) contains 7,473 characters in the range U+2CEB0 through 2EBE0 that were added in Unicode 10.0 (2017). It includes more than 1,000 Sawndip characters for Zhuang.

==== Charts ====
2CEB0–2EBEF.

==== Sources ====
Note: Some characters appear in more than one source, so the sum of individual character counts (8,098) is greater than the number of encoded characters (7,473).

Member	Code	Source	Character count	Total
China	GCA	Culture and Art Publishing House Ideographs	100	1,627
China	GCESI	Characters collected by China Electronics Standardization Institute	73	1,627
China	GCY	Ciyuan	122	1,627
China	GDM	Place name characters from the Public Order Administration, Ministry of Public Security of the People's Republic of China	30	1,627
China	GFC	Modern Chinese Standard Dictionary	27	1,627
China	GIDC	ID System of the Ministry of Public Security of China	1	1,627
China	GKJ	Terms in Sciences and Technologies approved by the China National Committee for Terms in Sciences and Technologies (CNCTST)	14	1,627
China	GLGYJ	Zhuang Liao Songs Research (壮族嘹歌研究)	1	1,627
China	GOCD	Oxford English-Chinese Chinese-English Dictionary (牛津英汉汉英词典)	2	1,627
China	GPGLG	Zhuang Folk Song Culture Series – Pingguo County Liao Songs (壮族民歌文化丛书•平果嘹歌)	69	1,627
China	GWY	Cultural Heritage Ideographs	25	1,627
China	GXHZ	Xinhua Da Zidian (新华大字典)	51	1,627
China	GXM	Characters for use in personal names in China from Public Order Administration, Ministry of Public Security of the People's Republic of China	2	1,627
China	GZ	Ancient Zhuang Character Dictionary	1,075	1,627
China	GZJW	Yin Zhou Jinwen Jicheng Yinde	33	1,627
China	GZYS	Chinese Ancient Ethnic Characters Research, 1984 (中国民族古文字研究)	2	1,627
Hong Kong	HD	Hong Kong Supplementary Character Set, 2016	1	1
Japan	JMJ	Character Information Development and Maintenance Project for e-Government "MojiJoho-Kiban Project"	1,646	1,646
North Korea	KP1	KPS 10721-2000	1	1
South Korea	KC	Korean History On-Line	1,810	1,810
Macau	MC	Macau Supplementary Character Set (MSCS) reference	22	22
Taiwan	T3	CNS 11643-1992 plane 3	1	7
Taiwan	T6	CNS 11643-1992 plane 6	3	7
Taiwan	T7	CNS 11643-1992 plane 7	2	7
Taiwan	TC	CNS 11643-2007 plane 12	1	7
United Kingdom	UK	IRG N2107R2	2	2
Vietnam	V0	TCVN 5773:1993	1	17
Vietnam	V4	Hán Nôm Coded Character Repertoire	8	17
Vietnam	VN	Vietnamese horizontal and vertical extensions	8	17
Buddhist canon	SAT	SAT Daizōkyō Text Database	2,884	2,884
N/A	UTC	UTC sources	81	81

=== CJK Unified Ideographs Extension G ===
A block named CJK Unified Ideographs Extension G was added as part of Unicode 13.0 to the Tertiary Ideographic Plane in the range U+30000 through U+3134F, containing 4,939 characters.

==== Charts ====
30000–3134F.

==== Sources ====
Note: Some characters appear in more than one source, so the sum of individual character counts (5,353) is greater than the number of encoded characters (4,939).

Member	Code	Source	Character count	Total
China	GCA	Culture and Art Publishing House Ideographs	131	2,353
China	GDM	Place name characters from the Public Order Administration, Ministry of Public Security of the People's Republic of China	49	2,353
China	GHZR	Hanyu Da Zidian 2nd ed.	878	2,353
China	GKJ	Terms in Sciences and Technologies (科技用字) approved by the China National Committee for Terms in Sciences and Technologies (CNCTST)	7	2,353
China	GPGLG	Zhuang Folk Song Culture Series – Pingguo County Liao Songs	13	2,353
China	GWY	Cultural Heritage Ideographs	56	2,353
China	GXM	Characters for use in personal names in China from Public Order Administration, Ministry of Public Security of the People's Republic of China	11	2,353
China	GZ	Ancient Zhuang Character Dictionary	1,208	2,353
South Korea	KC	Korean History On-Line	435	435
Taiwan	T13	CNS 11643 (pending new version) plane 19	347	354
Taiwan	T5	CNS 11643-1992 plane 5	1	354
Taiwan	TB	CNS 11643-2007 plane 11	3	354
Taiwan	TC	CNS 11643-2007 plane 12	2	354
Taiwan	TD	CNS 11643-2007 plane 13	1	354
United Kingdom	UK	IRG N2107R2	1,566	1,566
Vietnam	V4	Hán Nôm Coded Character Repertoire	6	76
Vietnam	VN	Vietnamese horizontal and vertical extensions	70	76
Buddhist canon	SAT	SAT Daizōkyō Text Database	329	329
N/A	UTC	UTC sources	240	240

=== CJK Unified Ideographs Extension H ===
A block named CJK Unified Ideographs Extension H was added as part of Unicode 15.0 to the Tertiary Ideographic Plane in the range U+31350 through U+323AF, containing 4,192 characters.

==== Charts ====
31350–323AF.

==== Sources ====
Note: Some characters appear in more than one source, so the sum of individual character counts (4,573) is greater than the number of encoded characters (4,192).

Member	Code	Source	Character count	Total
China	GCA	Culture and Art Publishing House Ideographs	22	1,089
China	GCESI	Characters collected by China Electronics Standardization Institute	1	1,089
China	GDM	Place name characters from the Public Order Administration, Ministry of Public Security of the People's Republic of China	298	1,089
China	GHC	Hanyu Da Cidian	27	1,089
China	GKJ	Terms in Sciences and Technologies approved by the China National Committee for Terms in Sciences and Technologies (CNCTST)	32	1,089
China	GLGYJ	Zhuang Liao Songs Research (壮族嘹歌研究)	11	1,089
China	GPGLG	Zhuang Folk Song Culture Series – Pingguo County Liao Songs (壮族民歌文化丛书•平果嘹歌)	14	1,089
China	GU	No source (the original source reference has been moved or removed)	1	1,089
China	GWY	Cultural Heritage Ideographs	20	1,089
China	GXM	Characters for use in personal names in China from Public Order Administration, Ministry of Public Security of the People's Republic of China	216	1,089
China	GZ	Ancient Zhuang Character Dictionary	330	1,089
China	GZA-1	A Vibrant and Unbroken Transmission—Filial Piety and Zhuang Funeral Songs (生生不息的传承•孝与壮族行孝歌之研究)	6	1,089
China	GZA-2	Annotated Long Zhuang Morality Songs (壮族伦理道德长诗传扬歌译注)	38	1,089
China	GZA-3	Compendium of Old Zhuang Folksong Texts—Wooing Songs vol. 1—Liao Songs (壮族民歌古籍集成•情歌（一）嘹歌)	2	1,089
China	GZA-4	Compendium of Old Zhuang Folksong Texts—Wooing Songs vol. 2—Fwen Nganx (壮族民歌古籍集成•情歌（二）欢𭪤)	11	1,089
China	GZA-6	Zhuang Proverbs from China (中国壮族谚语)	59	1,089
China	GZA-7	Ancient Remembrance—Zhuang Creation Myth Songs (远古的追忆•壮族创世神话古歌研究)	1	1,089
North Korea	KP1	KPS 10721-2000	1	1
South Korea	KC	Korean History On-Line	512	512
Taiwan	T12	CNS 11643 (pending new version) plane 18	7	716
Taiwan	T13	CNS 11643 (pending new version) plane 19	696	716
Taiwan	T4	CNS 11643-1992 plane 4	1	716
Taiwan	T6	CNS 11643-1992 plane 6	1	716
Taiwan	T7	CNS 11643-1992 plane 7	2	716
Taiwan	TB	CNS 11643-2007 plane 11	5	716
Taiwan	TC	CNS 11643-2007 plane 12	3	716
Taiwan	TE	CNS 11643-2007 plane 14	1	716
United Kingdom	UK	IRG N2232R	917	917
Vietnam	V0	TCVN 5773:1993	6	931
Vietnam	V4	Hán Nôm Coded Character Repertoire	74	931
Vietnam	VN	Vietnamese horizontal and vertical extensions	851	931
Buddhist canon	SAT	SAT Daizōkyō Text Database	241	241
N/A	UTC	UTC sources	166	166

=== CJK Unified Ideographs Extension I ===
A block named CJK Unified Ideographs Extension I was added as part of Unicode 15.1 to the Supplementary Ideographic Plane in the range U+2EBF0 through U+2EE5F, containing 622 characters.

==== Charts ====
2EBF0–2EE5F.

==== Sources ====
Note: Some characters appear in more than one source, making the sum of individual character counts (780) more than the number of encoded characters (622).

Member	Code	Source	Character count	Total
China	GIDC23	ID system of the Ministry of Public Security of China, 2023	622	622
Japan	JMJ	Character Information Development and Maintenance Project for e-Government "MojiJoho-Kiban Project"	1	1
Taiwan	T13	CNS 11643 (pending new version) plane 19	1	155
Taiwan	T9	CNS 11643 (pending new version) plane 9	3	155
Taiwan	TB	CNS 11643-2007 plane 11	12	155
Taiwan	TC	CNS 11643-2007 plane 12	78	155
Taiwan	TD	CNS 11643-2007 plane 13	54	155
Taiwan	TE	CNS 11643-2007 plane 14	7	155
N/A	UTC	UTC sources	2	2

=== CJK Unified Ideographs Extension J ===
A block named CJK Unified Ideographs Extension J was added as part of Unicode 17.0 to the Tertiary Ideographic Plane in the range U+323B0-U+3347F, containing 4,298 characters.

==== Charts ====
323B0–3347F.

==== Sources ====
Note: Some characters appear in more than one source, making the sum of individual character counts (4,469) more than the number of encoded characters (4,298).

Member	Code	Source	Character count	Total
China	G5	GB/T 13132 (unpublished GB/T 7590–1987 unsimplified forms)	1	1,065
China	G7	General Purpose Hanzi List for Modern Chinese Language, and General List of Simplified Hanzi (现代汉语通用字表)	1	1,065
China	GCA	Culture and Art Publishing House Ideographs (文化艺术出版社用字)	17	1,065
China	GDM	Place name characters from the Public Order Administration, Ministry of Public Security of the People's Republic of China	144	1,065
China	GKJ	Terms in Sciences and Technologies approved by the China National Committee for Terms in Sciences and Technologies (CNCTST)	567	1,065
China	GWY	Cultural Heritage Ideographs (文化遗产用字)	40	1,065
China	GXM	Characters for use in personal names in China from Public Order Administration, Ministry of Public Security of the People's Republic of China	5	1,065
China	GZ	Ancient Zhuang Character Dictionary	290	1,065
South Korea	KC	Korean History On-Line	178	178
Taiwan	T11	CNS 11643 (pending new version) plane 17	1	940
Taiwan	T7	CNS 11643-1992 plane 7	2	940
Taiwan	T9	CNS 11643 (pending new version) plane 9	59	940
Taiwan	TB	CNS 11643-2007 plane 11	70	940
Taiwan	TC	CNS 11643-2007 plane 12	165	940
Taiwan	TD	CNS 11643-2007 plane 13	241	940
Taiwan	TE	CNS 11643-2007 plane 14	396	940
Taiwan	TF	CNS 11643-2007 plane 15	6	940
United Kingdom	UK	IRG N2232R	6	906
United Kingdom	UK	IRG N2487	900	906
Vietnam	V0	TCVN 5773:1993	16	991
Vietnam	V1	TCVN 6056:1995	1	991
Vietnam	V2	VHN 01–1998	2	991
Vietnam	V3	VHN 02–1998	1	991
Vietnam	V4	Hán Nôm Coded Character Repertoire	58	991
Vietnam	VN	Vietnamese horizontal and vertical extensions	913	991
Buddhist canon	SAT	SAT Daizōkyō Text Database	259	260
Buddhist canon	SATM	SAT manuscript collection for Buddhist studies	1	260
N/A	UTC	UTC sources	129	129

=== CJK Compatibility Ideographs ===
The block named CJK Compatibility Ideographs (F900–FAFF) was created to retain round-trip compatibility with other standards.

However, twelve characters in this block actually have the "Unified Ideograph" property: U+FA0E 﨎, U+FA0F 﨏, U+FA11 﨑, U+FA13 﨓, U+FA14 﨔, U+FA1F 﨟, U+FA21 﨡, U+FA23 﨣, U+FA24 﨤, U+FA27 﨧, U+FA28 﨨, and U+FA29 﨩. None of the other characters in this and other "Compatibility" blocks relate to CJK unification.

While 龜 and 亀 are not considered unifiable, U+FA20 蘒 CJK COMPATIBILITY IDEOGRAPH-FA20 is considered a duplicate to U+8612 蘒 CJK UNIFIED IDEOGRAPH-8612.

==== Charts ====
F900–FAFF.

==== Sources ====
Note: All characters appear in more than one source, so the sum of individual character counts (40) is greater than the number of encoded characters (12).

Member	Code	Source	Character count	Total
China	GCA	Culture and Art Publishing House Ideographs (文化艺术出版社用字)	1	12
China	GDM	Place name characters from the Public Order Administration, Ministry of Public Security of the People's Republic of China	1	12
China	GU	No source (the original source reference has been moved or removed)	10	12
Hong Kong	H	Hong Kong Supplementary Character Set, 2008	1	3
Hong Kong	HB2	Big-5, Level 2	2	3
Japan	J3	JIS X 0213:2004 Level 3	72	101
Japan	J4	JIS X 0213:2004 Level 4	9	101
Japan	JA	Japanese IT Vendors Contemporary Ideographs, 1993	1	101
Japan	JA3	JIS X 0213:2004 level-3 characters replacing JA characters	1	101
Japan	JARIB	ARIB STD-B24 Version 5.1, March 14 2007	3	101
Japan	JMJ	Character Information Development and Maintenance Project for e-Government "MojiJoho-Kiban Project"	15	101
North Korea	KP1	KPS 10721-2000	106	107
North Korea	KPU	The source reference for this ideograph has been moved; the value is its code point.	1	107
South Korea	K0	KS X 1001:2004 (formerly KS C 5601–1987)	270	270
Taiwan	TF	CNS 11643-2007 plane 15	1	1
Vietnam	V0	TCVN 5773:1993	3	3
N/A	UTC	UTC sources	34	34

== Known issues ==
=== Disunification ===
==== U+4039 ====
The character U+4039 (䀹) was a unification of two different characters (one with jiā 夾 phonetic and one with shǎn 㚒 phonetic) until Unicode 5.0. However, they were lexically different characters that should not have been unified; they have different pronunciations and different meanings.

The proposal of disunification of U+4039 was accepted for Unicode 5.1, encoding a new character at U+9FC3 (鿃) to represent shǎn.

==== Other 3 glyphs in Extension B ====
In CJK Unified Ideographs Extension B, some characters were incorrectly unified with others. These characters include U+2017B (𠅻), U+204AF (𠒯) and U+24CB2 (𤲲). The first two characters contained a wrong unification of Chinese and Vietnamese source of their glyph, while the last one unifies the Chinese and Taiwanese ones.

The glyphs for U+2017B (𠅻) and U+204AF (𠒯) were corrected in version 10.0, and the erroneous UCS2003 source glyph U+24CB2 (𤲲) was removed in version 13.0.

=== Unifiable variants and exact duplicates ===
Also in CJK Unified Ideographs Extension B, hundreds of glyph variants were encoded by mistake. Additionally, an ISO/IEC JTC 1/SC 2 report has found that six exact duplicates (where the same character has inadvertently been encoded twice) and two semi-duplicates (where the CJK-B character represents a de facto disunification of two glyph forms unified in the corresponding BMP character) were encoded by mistake:

- U+34A8 㒨 = U+20457 𠑗 : U+20457 is the same as the China-source glyph for U+34A8, but it is significantly different from the Taiwan-source glyph for U+34A8
- U+3DB7 㶷 = U+2420E 𤈎 : same glyph shapes
- U+8641 虁 = U+27144 𧅄 : U+27144 is the same as the Korean-source glyph for U+8641, but it is significantly different from the mainland China-, Taiwan- and Japan-source glyphs for U+8641
- U+204F2 𠓲 = U+23515 𣔕 : same glyph shapes, but ordered under different radicals
- U+249BC 𤦼 = U+249E9 𤧩 : same glyph shapes
- U+24BD2 𤯒 = U+2A415 𪐕 : same glyph shapes, but ordered under different radicals
- U+26842 𦡂 = U+26866 𦡦 : same glyph shapes
- U+FA23 﨣 = U+27EAF 𧺯 : same glyph shapes (U+FA23 﨣 is a unified CJK ideograph, despite its name "CJK COMPATIBILITY IDEOGRAPH-FA23.")

== Other CJK ideographs in Unicode, not Unified ==
Apart from the eleven blocks of "Unified Ideographs," Unicode has about a dozen more blocks with not-unified CJK-characters. These are mainly CJK radicals, strokes, punctuation, marks, symbols and compatibility characters. Although some characters have their (decomposable) counterparts in other blocks, the usages can be different. An example of a not-unified CJK-character is U+3007 〇 IDEOGRAPHIC NUMBER ZERO in the CJK Symbols and Punctuation block. Although it is not covered under "CJK Unified Ideographs", it is treated as a CJK-character for all other intents and purposes.

Four blocks of compatibility characters are included for compatibility with legacy text handling systems and older character sets:

- CJK Compatibility (3300–33FF)
- CJK Compatibility Forms (FE30–FE4F)
- CJK Compatibility Ideographs (F900–FAFF)
- CJK Compatibility Ideographs Supplement (2F800–2FA1F)

They include forms of characters for vertical text layout and rich text characters that Unicode recommends handling through other means. Therefore, their use is discouraged.

== Unihan database ==
The Unihan database maintained by the Unicode Consortium provides information about all of the unified Han characters encoded in the Unicode Standard, including mappings to various national and industry standards, indices into standard dictionaries, encoded variants, pronunciations in various languages, and an English definition. The database is available to the public as text files and via an interactive website. The latter also includes representative glyphs and definitions for compound words drawn from the free Japanese EDICT and Chinese CEDICT dictionary projects (which are provided for convenience and are not a formal part of the Unicode Standard).

== Font support ==
The blocks CJK Unified Ideographs and CJK Unified Ideographs Extension A, being parts of the Basic Multilingual Plane, are supported by the majority of the CJK fonts. However, Japanese and Korean fonts usually have fewer characters (about 13,000 and 8,000, respectively) than Chinese. Extensions B, C, D are supported by additional fonts MingLiU-ExtB, MingLiU_HKSCS-ExtB, PMingLiU-ExtB, SimSun-ExtB included in Microsoft Windows since Vista.

== Unicode version history ==
CJK unified ideograph additions per Unicode version
Unicode version	Addition	Plane	Characters added	Total characters
1.0 (1991)	CJK Compatibility Ideographs	Basic Multilingual Plane (BMP)	12	20,914
1.0 (1991)	CJK Unified Ideographs	BMP	20,902	20,914
3.0 (1999)	CJK Unified Ideographs Extension A	BMP	6,582	27,496
3.1 (2001)	CJK Unified Ideographs Extension B	Supplementary Ideographic Plane (SIP)	42,711	70,207
4.1 (2005)	CJK Unified Ideographs: Ideographs from HKSCS-2004 and GB 18030-2000 not in ISO 10646	BMP	22	70,229
5.1 (2008)	CJK Unified Ideographs: Ideographs from Adobe Japan and disunification of U+4039	BMP	8	70,237
5.2 (2009)	CJK Unified Ideographs: Characters from ARIB #47, #95, #93 and HKSCS	BMP	8	74,394
5.2 (2009)	CJK Unified Ideographs Extension C	SIP	4,149	74,394
6.0 (2010)	CJK Unified Ideographs Extension D	SIP	222	74,616
6.1 (2012)	CJK Unified Ideographs: Character corresponding to Adobe-Japan1-6 CID+20156	BMP	1	74,617
8.0 (2015)	CJK Unified Ideographs	BMP	9	80,388
8.0 (2015)	CJK Unified Ideographs Extension E	SIP	5,762	80,388
10.0 (2017)	CJK Unified Ideographs	BMP	21	87,882
10.0 (2017)	CJK Unified Ideographs Extension F	SIP	7,473	87,882
11.0 (2018)	CJK Unified Ideographs	BMP	5	87,887
13.0 (2020)	CJK Unified Ideographs	BMP	13	92,856
13.0 (2020)	CJK Unified Ideographs Extension A	BMP	10	92,856
13.0 (2020)	CJK Unified Ideographs Extension B	SIP	7	92,856
13.0 (2020)	CJK Unified Ideographs Extension G	Tertiary Ideographic Plane (TIP)	4,939	92,856
14.0 (2021)	CJK Unified Ideographs	BMP	3	92,865
14.0 (2021)	CJK Unified Ideographs Extension B	SIP	2	92,865
14.0 (2021)	CJK Unified Ideographs Extension C	SIP	4	92,865
15.0 (2022)	CJK Unified Ideographs Extension C	SIP	1	97,058
15.0 (2022)	CJK Unified Ideographs Extension H	TIP	4,192	97,058
15.1 (2023)	CJK Unified Ideographs Extension I	SIP	622	97,680
17.0 (2025)	CJK Unified Ideographs Extension C	SIP	6	101,996
17.0 (2025)	CJK Unified Ideographs Extension E	SIP	12	101,996
17.0 (2025)	CJK Unified Ideographs Extension J	TIP	4,298	101,996
18.0 (2026)	CJK Unified Ideographs Extension D	SIP	1	101,997

== See also ==
- List of Unicode characters
- List of CJK fonts
- Chinese cultural sphere
