= Grand Chinese Dictionary =

Grand Chinese Dictionary may refer to:

- Hanyu Da Zidian (汉语大字典), a reference dictionary on Chinese characters
- Hanyu Da Cidian (汉语大词典), most inclusive available Chinese dictionary
- Zhonghua Da Zidian (中华大字典), an unabridged Chinese dictionary of characters
