= Zhongwen Da Cidian =

Chinese dictionary

- Traditional Chinese: 中文大辭典
- Simplified Chinese: 中文大辞典
- Literal meaning: The Big Dictionary of Chinese
Transcriptions
Standard Mandarin
- Hanyu Pinyin: Zhōngwén Dà Cídiǎn
- Wade–Giles: Chung-wen Ta Tz‘u-tien

The Zhongwen Da Cidian, also known in English as the Encyclopaedic Dictionary of the Chinese Language, is an unabridged Chinese dictionary, edited by Zhang Qiyun and others. The first edition had 40 volumes including its radical index in volume 39 and stroke index in volume 40. It was published from 1962 through 1968.

This encyclopedic dictionary includes 49,905 Chinese characters arranged under the traditional 214 Kangxi radicals. Each character entry shows the evolution of graphic forms (such as small seal script), gives pronunciations, and chronological meanings with sources. Words, phrases, and four-character idioms are given under the head character entry, arranged according to the number of strokes in their components. "There are many phrases under some characters," for example, 3,417 under yi (一 "one") and 1,398 under huang (黄 "yellow").

Although the Zhongwen Da Cidian is based on the first edition 1960 Dai Kan-Wa Jiten ("Comprehensive Chinese–Japanese Dictionary") by Tetsuji Morohashi, this work is not listed under works consulted. The Zhongwen Da Cidian is one of the most extensive reference works of Chinese, rivaled only by the later 1993 completion of the Hanyu Da Cidian ("Comprehensive Dictionary of Chinese").

== See also ==
- Dai Kan-Wa Jiten, of Japanese kanji
- Han-Han Dae Sajeon, of Korean hanja
- Hanyu Da Cidian
- Hanyu Da Zidian
