= Jiang Nan (Ming dynasty) =

Jiang Nan (Chinese: 姜南; pinyin: Jiāng Nán; Wade–Giles: Chiang Nan) was a Chinese literary figure during the Ming dynasty. He was from Renhe in Zhejiang. Many of his works are included in the collection (congshu) Yihai zhuchen, as well as in other Chinese anthologies.

== Works ==
(HYDZD bibliography 2053–2063)

- Hulizi bitan 瓠里子笔谈
- Bancun yeren xiantan 半村野人闲谈
- Touweng suibi 投瓮随笔
- Baopu jianji 抱璞简记
- Xuepu yuli 学圃余力
- Moshe qianbo 墨畲钱镈
- Xianyan xinlu 洗砚新录
- Da bin ru yu 大宾辱语
- Rongtang jiwen 蓉塘记闻
- Kouhang pingshi 叩航凭试
- Chuozhu ji 辍筑记 (Shuofu xu 说郛续)
