= Gou xuan =

Chinese Yuan dynasty text

Gou xuan (simplified Chinese: 钩玄; traditional Chinese: 鉤玄; pinyin: Gōu xuán; Wade–Giles: Kou hsüan; "Exploring the Profound") is a Chinese text from the Yuan dynasty. According to the Dictionary of the Ben Cao Gang Mu, it was authored by Xianyu Shu 鲜于枢; 鮮于樞 (1246–1302).

It is a single-volume work (1 juan) included in the collection Shuofu 说郛, which was compiled by Master Tao Zongzi 陶宗仪; 陶宗儀 (1329–1410). This collection encompasses a wide variety of texts from the Yuan and early Ming periods and serves as an important source for the literary and cultural history of these eras.

The work is mentioned in the Bencao gangmu (本草纲目), the famous pharmacopeia by Li Shizhen 李时珍 from the Ming dynasty, and is included in the Yaoxing lei (药性类 yàoxìng lèi) – the chapters on the properties of medicinal substances.

Within the text, ancient medical recipes are cited, such as the recipe by the renowned physician Song Huizhi from Hangzhou in the Yuan period, which is also referenced in the Bencao gangmu.

The Hanyu da zidian (HYDZD) cites the Gou xuan 钩玄 without mentioning an author, based on the edition of the Shuofu 说郛 in the edition of the Wanwei Shantang Studio (Wanweishantang ben 宛委山堂本).

== Bibliography ==
- Hanyu da zidian. 1993 (one-volume edition)
- Zheng Jinsheng, Nalini Kirk, Paul D. Buell: Dictionary of the Ben Cao Gang Mu, Volume 3. Persons and Literary Sources, vol. 3. 2018 (in partial view)
