= Zhongguo yanyu xuan =

Reference work on Chinese proverbs

Zhongguo yuyan xuan (simplified Chinese: 中国谚语选; traditional Chinese: 中國諺語選; Selected Chinese Proverbs) is a reference work compiled by Gao Wenxing, Ji Chengjia, Zhang Zhaoqiang, and Shang Yanling. It was published by Gansu People’s Publishing House in 1981. The work is issued in two volumes and contains over 12,000 proverbs and nearly 2,000 two-part allegorical sayings.

== Contents ==
The collection is arranged by subject into eight thematic sections: society, philosophy, self-cultivation, study, daily life, farming, forestry-animal husbandry-sideline-fishery, and meteorology. Each section is divided into chapters and subsections; within each subsection, the proverbs are grouped by content.

The Chinese proverbs express rich content in highly condensed language. The saying “When hearts unite, Mount Tai can be moved” (Chinese: 众心齐，泰山移; pinyin: Zhòng xīn qí, Tài Shān yí) f.e. illustrates the philosophy of solidarity and cooperation.

The Hanyu da zidian (Dictionary of Chinese Characters) f.e. is referencing to the edition by the Gansu People’s Publishing House (1981).

== See also ==
- Zhongguo yanyu ziliao

== Bibliography ==
- Gao Wenxing 高文星, Ji Chengjia 季成家, Zhang Zhaoqiang 张泎羌, Shang Yanling 尚延令: Zhongguo yuyan xuan 中国谚语选 [Selected Chinese Proverbs]. Gansu renmin chubanshe 甘肃人民出版社 1981
- Hanyu da zidian 汉语大字典 [Dictionary of Chinese Characters]. 1993 (one-volume edition)
