= Zhongguo yanyu ziliao =

1961 collection of Chinese proverbs

Zhongguo yanyu ziliao (simplified Chinese: 中国谚语资料; traditional Chinese: 中國諺語資料; pinyin: zhōngguóyànyǔzīliào; Collection of Chinese Proverbs or Collection of Chinese Sayings) is a reference work on proverbs compiled by the Folklore Group of the 1955 class of the Literature Department of the Lanzhou Art College (兰州艺术学院). The book was first published in 1961 by the Shanghai Literature and Art Publishing House. The complete edition comprises three volumes. The work contains a large number of folk wisdom and proverbs or sayings (yanyu, simplified Chinese: 谚语; traditional Chinese: 諺語; “proverb; saying; adage; saw”) and represents an important reference source for the study of traditional Chinese folk culture.

The work is, for example, referenced by the Hanyu da zidian (HYDZD), although it is not listed in its bibliography.

== Example ==
重賞之下,必有勇夫。 [Zhòng shǎng zhī xià, bì yǒu yǒng fū.]

English translation:

With great rewards, there will be brave men.

== See also ==
- Zhongguo yanyu xuan
- Chinese proverbs

== Bibliography ==
- Zhongguo yanyu ziliao 中国谚语资料 (3 vols.). Shanghai wenyi chubanshe 上海文艺出版社 1961
- Hanyu da zidian. 1993 (one-volume edition)
- T. C. Lai: Selected Chinese Sayings. Published by University Book Store, Hong Kong, 1961
