= Lufei Kui =

Chinese educator and linguist (1886–1941)

Lufei Kui 陸費逵
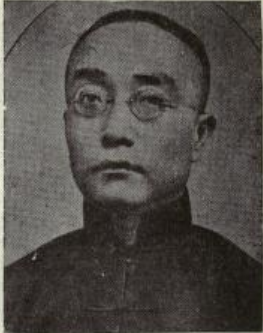
- Born: Lufei Kui; 17 September 1886; Hanzhong, Shaanxi, Qing dynasty
- Died: 9 July 1941 (aged 54); British Hong Kong
- Occupations: Educator, essayist, linguist, publisher
- Known for: Founder of publishing house Zhonghua Book Company

Lufei Kui
- Traditional Chinese: 陸費逵
- Simplified Chinese: 陆费逵
Transcriptions
Standard Mandarin
- Hanyu Pinyin: Lùfèi Kuí
- Wade–Giles: Lu4-fei4 K'uei2

Bohong
- Traditional Chinese: 伯鴻
- Simplified Chinese: 伯鸿
Transcriptions
Standard Mandarin
- Hanyu Pinyin: Bóhóng
- Wade–Giles: Po2-hung2

Lufei Kui (simplified Chinese: 陆费逵; traditional Chinese: 陸費逵, 17 September 1886 – 9 July 1941) was a Chinese educator, essayist, linguist, and publisher. His courtesy name was Bohong (伯鴻, 伯鸿). He founded the influential publisher Zhonghua Book Company, and was an early advocate for simplified Chinese characters.

== Early life ==
Lufei was born in a scholar-official family in Hanzhong, Shaanxi, though his parents had come from Tongxiang, Zhejiang. His mother was a niece of Li Hongzhang, a famous Chinese politician during the late Qing dynasty. In his early years, Lufei was taught in Literary Chinese by his mother. Beginning in 1898, he attended to Nanchang English School (南昌英語學塾, 南昌英语学塾) and started to learn English and Japanese. He was influenced by new thought and was thus pro-revolutionary.

== Career ==
In the spring of 1903, Lufei went to Wuchang, where he launched Xinxuejie Bookstore (新學界書店, 新学界书店). As the manager, he sold many pro-revolution books and booklets. He joined the underground revolution movement and became a surveillant. In 1905 he became the editor-in-chief of the newspaper Chubao (楚報, 楚报) and after the closure of the newspaper under the pressure of Governor Zhang Zhidong he fled to Shanghai. There, he was employed as the manager and editor of a publishing company. In late 1906, Lufei joined Wenming Shuju (Wenming Books), a textbook publishing company as an editor, and also became the headmaster of Wenming Primary School. As his contributions and responsibilities increased at Wenming Books, he started to become a major figure in education and publishing in Shanghai.

In 1908, Lufei joined The Commercial Press, and soon was put in charge of publication and communications. In 1909, the Commercial Press started the first professional magazine in education in China, the Education Magazine (教育雜誌, 教育杂志), and Lufei became its Editor-in-Chief. Lufei believed that education was the key in making a better nation. He published many essays and thesis on the magazine to introduce his ideas in educational reforms.

In 1909, Lufei published an article titled "General Education Should Use Vernacular Characters" (普通教育應當採用俗體字, 普通教育应当采用俗体字) on Jiaoyu Zazhi. This was the first time the promotion of simplified Chinese characters had been advocated in print. In 1922, Lufei published another article "Deliverance on Coordinating Chinese Characters" (整理漢字的意見, 整理汉字的意见), in which he suggested that educators should respect the simplified characters invented by the folk and should adopt these characters in their teaching. He also proposed to simplify complex characters systematically.

Lufei is also known as the founder of Zhonghua Book Company, one of the most influential contemporary publishing company, in textbooks, dictionaries, translations of important books in the world, as well as in Literary Chinese and Chinese historical publications. Lufei founded Zhonghua Book Company in 1912 on the same day as the founding of Republic of China (1912-1949) and immediately published a new set of textbooks for schools in the post Qing dynasty republic. In the 1930s, Zhonghua was one of the most successful publishing companies in East Asia. By the Second Sino-Japanese War, the annual income of Zhonghua was over 10,000,000 yuan and had over 40 branches throughout China. In Shanghai and Hong Kong, it had over 3,000 employees. Under the management of Lufei, Zhonghua published a series of important books for Chinese cultural and historical studies, such as Zhonghua Da Zidian, Cihai, Sibu Beiyao (四部備要, 四部备要) and the Complete Classics Collection of Ancient China.

During the war, due to his influence, Lufei's life was threatened by Japanese agents. He moved the headquarters of Zhonghua to Kunming. Then he went to Hong Kong, then under British rule, in order to produce enough books for the endangered nation. In 1941, Lufei died of cerebral hemorrhage.
