= Zhonghua Da Zidian =

Chinese dictionary

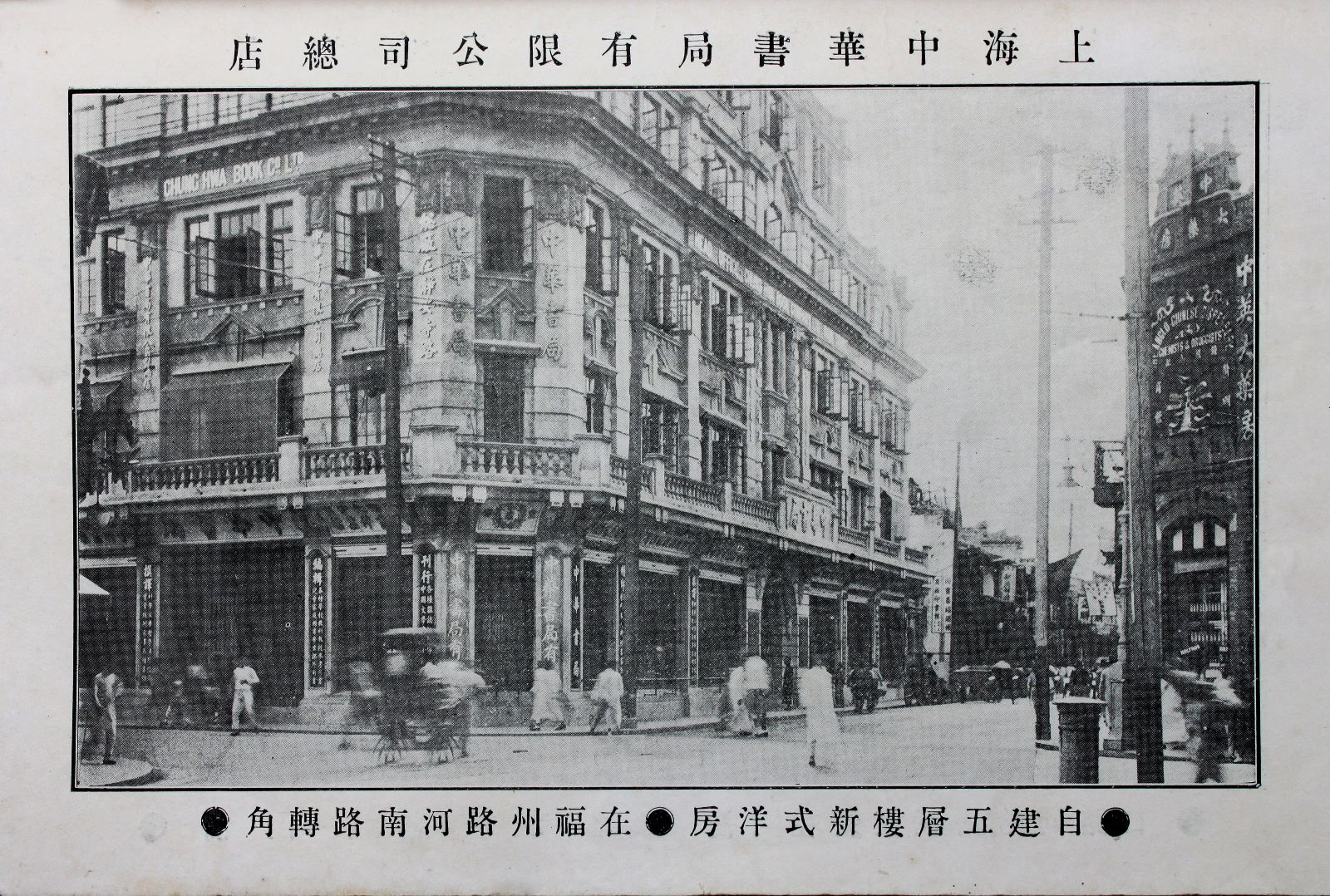
The Shanghai headquarters of Zhonghua Book Company in 1916.

The Zhonghua Da Zidian (traditional Chinese: 中華大字典; simplified Chinese: 中华大字典; pinyin: Zhōnghuá Dà Zìdiǎn; Wade–Giles: Chung-hua Ta Tzu-tien; lit. 'Chinese Great Dictionary') is an unabridged Chinese dictionary of characters, originally published in 1915 by the Zhonghua Book Company in Shanghai. The chief editors were Xu Yuan'gao, Lufei Kui, and Ouyang Pucun (歐陽溥存/欧阳溥存). It was based upon the 1716 Kangxi Dictionary, and is internally organized using the 214 Kangxi radicals. The 1915 publication contains more than 48,000 entries for individual characters, including many invented in the two centuries since the Kangxi Dictionary, making it the largest character dictionary of its time.

Each character entry includes the fanqie spelling from the Jiyun, the modern pronunciation given with a common homophone, different meanings, classical quotations, and two-character compounds using the character. One strength of the Zhonghua dictionary is its clear presentation of definitions. Separate definitions are numbered, instead of being run together in a column as was the case with earlier Chinese dictionaries, which is helpful to users because some characters have as many as 40 separate definitions. Although Teng and Biggerstaff acknowledged that the Zhonghua Da Zidian "is very comprehensive and is very carefully compiled," they noted three defects. The index, which is arranged by number of strokes, can be inconvenient (e.g., 2189 characters are listed under 9 strokes). The margins do not have characters to help locate entries under a radical. The two-character phrases may be listed under either component.

== Publications ==
=== Zhonghua Da Zidian by Zhonghua Book Company (Beijing) ===
- 1st edition (17018-81): A condensed reprint based on the 1935 edition. 2 volumes.

- 1st impression (1978-10)
- 4th Beijing impression (1985-01)

=== Zhonghua Da Zidian by Shanghai Chunghwa Book Company ===
- 1st edition (1915)

=== Zhonghua Da Zidian by Chung Hwa Book Company, Limited ===
- 1st edition (1960)
- 6th edition (1983-09)
- 7th edition (中華大字典) (ISBN 978-957-43-2915-1) (2015-11-01): 2 volumes.

=== Zhonghua Da Zidian by The Commercial Press International Co., Ltd. ===
- 1st? edition: Includes 57,470 head letters.

- Regular print (中华大字典/Zhonghua Da Zidian) (ISBN 978-7-5176-0089-3): 1 edition, 2 impressions. 1 volume.

- Edition 1, ?th impression (2015-03-??)

- Condensed print (中华大字典 缩印本/Zhonghua Da Zidian) (ISBN 978-7-5176-0133-3): 1 edition, 1 impressions. 1 volume.

- Edition 1, 1st impression (2015-06-??)

== See also ==
- Dai Kan-Wa jiten
- Han-Han Dae Sajeon
- Hanyu Da Cidian
- Hanyu Da Zidian
- Kangxi Dictionary
