= Dai Kan-Wa Jiten =

Japanese kanji dictionary

The Dai Kan-Wa Jiten (大漢和辞典; "The Great Chinese–Japanese Dictionary") is a Japanese dictionary of kanji (Chinese characters) compiled by Tetsuji Morohashi. Remarkable for its comprehensiveness and size, Morohashi's dictionary contains over 50,000 character entries and 530,000 compound words. Haruo Shirane (2003:15) said: "This is the definitive dictionary of the Chinese characters and one of the great dictionaries of the world."

== History ==
Tetsuji Morohashi was originally motivated to create a dictionary in 1917 when he went to China to study Chinese. Trying to look up words in the largest available Chinese dictionaries was frustrating; the Kangxi Dictionary defines characters but not phrases, the Peiwen Yunfu lists phrases without definitions, and the Zhonghua Da Zidian had just been published. Morohashi's autobiography explains (Wilkinson 2000:74) that "he had to spend between a quarter and a third of his study time trying to find the meanings of words and phrases. This tedium he felt could be avoided if there were a dictionary that provided both citations and definitions." When Morohashi returned to Japan in 1919, he had 20 notebooks filled with Chinese vocabulary.

In 1925, Ippei Suzuki (鈴木 一平), president of the Taishukan publishing house, requested Morohashi to edit a comprehensive kanji dictionary of an unprecedented scale. In order to print this giant reference work, fonts for many rare characters had to be created, since none existed. The first volume was published in 1943, but the fire-bombing of Tokyo destroyed the printing plates and special fonts in 1945. After the war, Morohashi and his fellow editors reconstructed the dictionary from proofs. Due to a shortage of skilled craftsmen, Suzuki persuaded Mokichi Ishii (石井 茂吉), co-inventor of phototypesetting, to recreate the necessary fonts. The first volume was published in 1955 and the final index volume in 1960. Morohashi was awarded the Order of the Chrysanthemum in 1957 and the Order of Culture in 1967 for his contributions to sinology and lexicography. Taishukan published a vocabulary index in 1990 and a supplemental volume in 2000.

== First edition ==
The original (1955–1960) Dai Kan-Wa Jiten has 13 volumes totaling 13,757 pages, and includes 49,964 head entries for characters, with over 370,000 words and phrases. This unabridged dictionary, often called the Morohashi in English, focuses upon Classical Chinese and Literary Chinese vocabulary. It provides encyclopedic information about poetry, book titles, historical figures, place names, Buddhist terms, and even modern expressions. The Dai Kan-Wa Jiten is intended for reading Chinese and does not cover Japanese words created since the Meiji era.

This is the format for main character entries:

- Pronunciations, in Sino-Japanese borrowings, Middle Chinese with every fanqie spelling and rime dictionary category listed in the Jiyun, and Modern Standard Chinese in the Zhuyin (or Bopomofo) system and in Wade-Giles romanization. Volume 1 contains Hanrei (凡例; "Introductory Remarks") and a comprehensive chart comparing the Zhuyin, Wade-Giles, and Pinyin systems for every phoneme used in modern Chinese.
- 10,000 Seal script characters, plus other variant written forms.
- Meanings, diachronically arranged by earliest citations. Usage examples are given from numerous classical texts and Chinese dictionaries.
- Character etymologies are occasionally included. These are not instances of word etymology as the term is understood in comparative linguistics, but character analysis, as originated by the Shuowen Jiezi.
- 2,300 Illustrations are included where useful, often copied from sources like the 1609 Sancai Tuhui.

One archaism of the first edition is giving Japanese pronunciations of characters in historical kana usage rather than modern, retaining for instance now-obsolete ゐ wi and ゑ we.

Each individual volume has a radical-and-stroke sorting index arranged by Chinese radical or signific (following the 214 Kangxi radicals), and subdivided by the total number of remaining strokes in the character. For Dai Kan-Wa Jiten users unfamiliar with this traditional system of dictionary collation, the final index volume is an essential tool.

Volume 13 contains four indices to the dictionary, which cite volume and page numbers for each character.

- The Sōkaku sakuin (総画索引; "Total Stroke Count Index") divides characters by overall stroke count (1-64), subdivided by radicals.
- The Jion sakuin (字音索引; "Sino-Japanese Reading Index") arranges characters by their borrowed Chinese pronunciations (on'yomi), then by stroke count.
- The Jikun sakuin (字訓索引; "Japanese Reading Index") arranges characters by their native Japanese pronunciations (kun'yomi), and further by stroke count.
- The Shikaku gōma sakuin (四角號碼索引; "Four corner method Index") organizes characters using a complex Chinese system of four-digit numbers (0000–9999), plus an optional extra number, then subdivided by the number of strokes.

Volume 13 also contains a Hoi (補遺; "Appendix") listing 1,062 Chinese characters that the dictionary uses in definitions but does not include as main entries, plus the official 1,850 Japanese tōyō kanji for general use, and 517 simplified Chinese characters.

== Supplemental volumes ==
Since the death of Tetsuji Morohashi in 1982 at the age of 99, Taishukan has published two Dai Kan-Wa Jiten augmentations that amount to Volumes 14 and 15.

The 1990 Goi sakuin (語彙索引; "Vocabulary Index") allows searching for words in Morohashi by their pronunciation in modern kana spelling, instead of the historical system used in Volumes 1–13. This index comprehensively lists every compound word listed in the main dictionary, including terms, phrases, and four-character idioms. Vocabulary is arranged in the standard gojūon (五十音; "fifty sound") ordering of kana and is cited by volume and page numbers.

The 2000 Hokan (補巻; "Supplemental Volume") adds some 800 main character entries, approximately 33,000 new vocabulary terms, novel readings of characters, variant characters, etc. This last volume includes four types of character indexes. Like the "Vocabulary Index", this supplement uses standard modern kana but also provides the historical equivalents.

== Other editions ==
The (1962–1968) Zhongwen Da Cidian, sometimes called the Chinese Morohashi, is very similar in structure to Dai Kan-Wa Jiten and was one of the most comprehensive Chinese dictionaries available until the publication of the Hanyu Da Cidian in 1993.

In 1982, Taishukan published an abridged "family edition" of the Dai Kan-Wa Jiten. Their four-volume Kō Kan-Wa Jiten (広漢和辞典; "Extensive Chinese–Japanese Dictionary") enters 20,769 characters and some 120,000 words. It adds early oracle bone script and bronzeware script examples, and proposes hypothetical Old Chinese etymologies and word families.

Kida Jun'ichirō wrote a Japanese book (1986) about the Dai Kan-Wa Jiten, and edited another (1994) about lexicographers that discusses Morohashi's contributions (chap. 4) and Ishii's creation of characters (chap. 11).

In November 2018, Taishukan released an electronic edition of Dai Kan-Wa Jiten (for Windows PCs).

== See also ==
- Han-Han Dae Sajeon
- Hanyu Da Cidian
- Hanyu Da Zidian
- Kangxi Dictionary
- Zhonghua Da Zidian
- Zhongwen Da Cidian
