= Kangaku =

Pre-modern study of China in Japan

Kangaku (漢学) was the pre-modern Japanese study of China. Kangaku was the counterpart of kokugaku and Yōgaku or Rangaku. Scholars of kangaku are called kangakusha (漢学者).

== Kangaku and sinology ==
In modern Japan, sinology (Chugokugaku, 中国学, or formerly Shinagaku, 支那學) refers to Western and modern Chinese studies, whereas kangaku refers to traditional or pre-modern studies.

The Chinese term for sinology, 漢學, and Japanese kangaku are represented by the same Chinese characters, but in Japan a distinction is made between kangaku and sinology.

== See also ==
- Sinology
- Jugaku
- Kokugaku
- Yōgaku (Rangaku)
