= Kangxi Dictionary =

18th-century Chinese dictionary

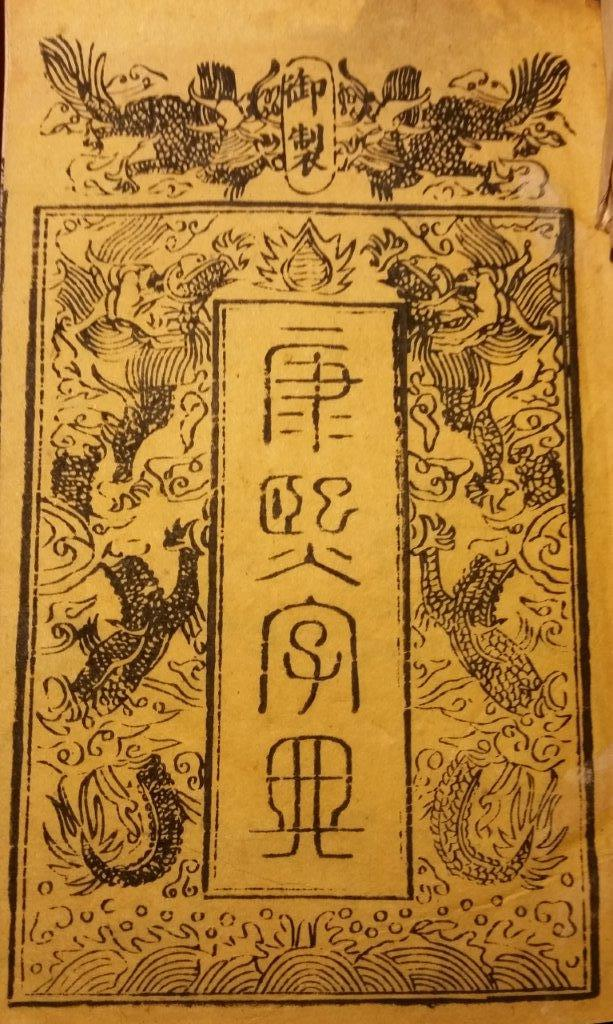
- Kangxi Dictionary, 3rd ed. (1827)

Chinese name
- Chinese: 康熙字典
Transcriptions
Standard Mandarin
- Hanyu Pinyin: Kāngxī Zìdiǎn
- Wade–Giles: K'ang-hsi Tzu-tien
Wu
- Romanization: Khan^{平}si^{入} Zy^{去}di^{平}
Yue: Cantonese
- Yale Romanization: Hōnghēi Jihdín
- Jyutping: Hong1 hei1 zi6 din2
Southern Min
- Hokkien POJ: Khong-hi Jī-tián

Vietnamese name
- Vietnamese alphabet: Khang Hi tự điển
- Hán-Nôm: 康熙字典

Korean name
- Hangul: 강희자전
- Hanja: 康熙字典
Transcriptions
- Revised Romanization: Ganghui Jajeon
- McCune–Reischauer: Kanghŭi Chajŏn

Japanese name
- Kanji: 康熙字典
- Hiragana: こうきじてん
Transcriptions
- Revised Hepburn: Kōki Jiten

The Kangxi Dictionary (Chinese: 康熙字典; pinyin: Kāngxī zìdiǎn) is a Chinese dictionary published in 1716 during the High Qing, considered from the time of its publishing until the early 20th century to be the most authoritative reference for written Chinese characters. Wanting an improvement upon earlier dictionaries, as well as to show his concern for Confucian culture and to foster standardization of the Chinese writing system, its compilation was ordered by the Kangxi Emperor in 1710, from whom the compendium gets its name. The dictionary was the largest of its kind, containing 47,043 character entries. Around 40% of them were graphical variants, while others were dead, archaic, or found only once in the Classical Chinese corpus. In today's vernacular written Chinese, fewer than a quarter of the dictionary's characters are commonly used.

The text is available in many forms, from Qing dynasty block print editions, to reprints using stitched bookbinding, to hardcovers including revisions and ancillary essays, to a digitized version accessible via the internet.

== Compilation ==
In his preface to the 1716 printing, the emperor wrote:

Every time I read widely in the commentaries on the classics, the pronunciations and meanings are complex and obscure, and each person protects his own explanations according to his individual view, so that it is not likely that any will communicate everything without gaps. Thus I have ordered the scholar officials to acquire all the old documents, then to arrange them and revise them.

The emperor chose the term zidian himself—at the time not having a meaning of 'dictionary', but rather something like a 'compendium' or 'standard' or 'model' characters, as to show their correct forms and authoritative pronunciations. The compendium was generally referred to simply as zidian, which later became a standard Chinese word for 'dictionary' in the 19th century, and used to title practically every Chinese dictionary published since then. Classical Chinese is largely morphosyllabic with very few bound morphemes, meaning that most individual characters represented independent words. As such, the compilers did not make a distinction between senses of 字; zì as 'characters' versus as 'words'; this distinction would only begin to be clearly made during the late 19th century.

The original editors included Zhang Yushu (1642–1711), Chen Tingjing (1639–1712), and a further staff of thirty men. However, both Zhang and Chen died within a year of their appointment to the task, and the work was taken up by scholars of the Hanlin Academy. The compilation was based partly on two Ming dynasty dictionaries: the 1615 Zihui by Mei Yingzuo, and the 1627 Zhengzitong by Zhang Zilie.

The imperial edict required that the project be completed within a five-year span. As such, errors were inevitable. Although the emperor's preface said "each and every definition is given in detail and every single pronunciation is provided". The scholar-official Wang Xihou (1713–1777) criticized the Kangxi Zidian in the preface of his own Ziguan dictionary. When the Qianlong Emperor—Kangxi's grandson—was informed of this insult in 1777, he sentenced Wang's entire family to death by the nine familial exterminations, the most extreme form of capital punishment. However, as was fairly typical in such cases with literary inquisition, the emperor commuted the sentence by pardoning all of Wang's relatives, and his grandsons given only a procedural sentence of execution at the autumn assizes (qiushen), during which the case would be reviewed and usually spared actual execution. Wang's own sentence would be commuted from death by a thousand cuts, to death by beheading. The later Daoguang Emperor appointed Wang Yinzhi (1766–1834) and a review board to compile an officially sanctioned supplement to the Kangxi Zidian, which was published in 1831 as the Zidian kaozheng (字典考證), correcting 2,588 mistakes mostly found in quotations and citations.

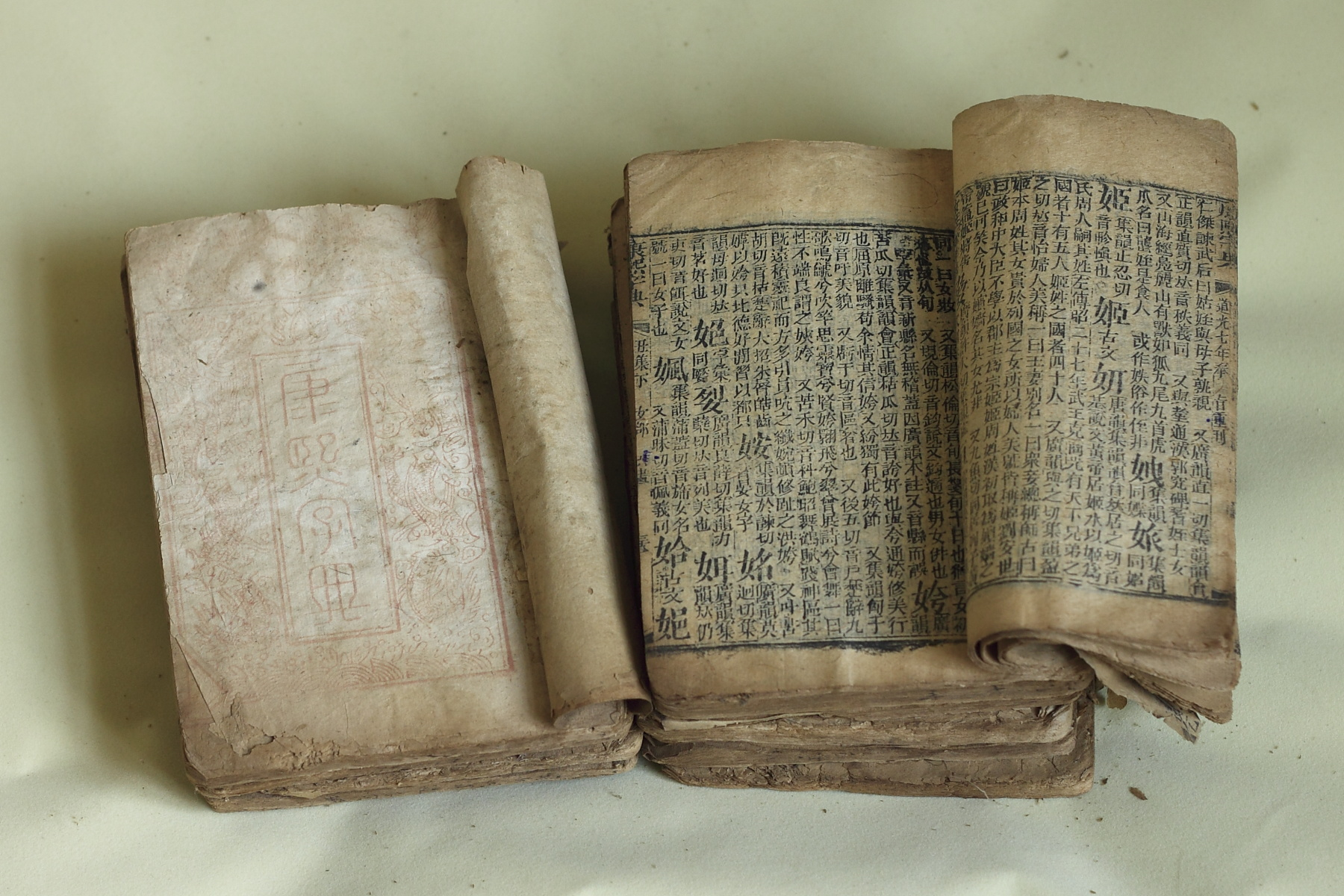
An 1827 version of the Kangxi Dictionary

The supplemented dictionary contains 47,035 distinct character entries, in addition to 1,995 graphical variants, giving a total of 49,030 different characters. They are grouped according to a list of 214 radicals, and further sorted by the number of additional strokes in the character. Although this particular set of 214 radicals was first used in the Zihui, they are now largely known as the Kangxi radicals, and remain popular as a method of categorizing Chinese characters.

The character entries provide definitions and pronunciations in both traditional fanqie spelling and with a modern homophone, as well as example quotations from the Chinese corpus, and lists of any variants and differing meanings. The compendium also contains rime tables with characters ordered by syllable rime classes, tones, as well as initial syllable onsets.

The missionary Walter Henry Medhurst, an early translator of the Bible into Chinese, compiled Medhurst's Chinese and English Dictionary (1842–1843) in two volumes, with Chinese sourced from the Kangxi Dictionary.

The dictionary is one of several used by the Ideographic Research Group for the Unicode standard.

== Structure ==
- Preface by the Kangxi Emperor: pp. 1–6 (御製序)
- Notes: pp. 7–12 (凡例)
- Phonology: pp. 13–40 (等韻)
- Table of contents: pp. 41–49 (總目)
- Index of characters: pp. 50–71 (檢字)
- The dictionary proper: pp. 75–1631
  - Main text: pp. 75–1538
  - Addendum contents: pp. 1539–1544 (補遺)
  - Addendum text: pp. 1545–1576
  - Appendix contents (No–source–characters): pp. 1577–1583 (備考)
  - Appendix text: pp. 1585–1631
- Postscript: pp. 1633–1635 (後記)
- Textual research: pp. 1637–1683 (考證)

== See also ==
- Dai Kan-Wa jiten (Great Chinese–Japanese Dictionary)
- Han-Han Dae Sajeon (Korean hanja-to-hangul dictionaries)
- Hanyu Da Zidian (Great Compendium of Chinese Characters)
- List of Kangxi radicals
- Peiwen Yunfu (Rhyme Storehouse of Esteemed Phrases)
- Zhonghua Da Zidian (Chinese Great Dictionary)
