= Hanja–Hangul dictionary =

Type of Korean dictionary

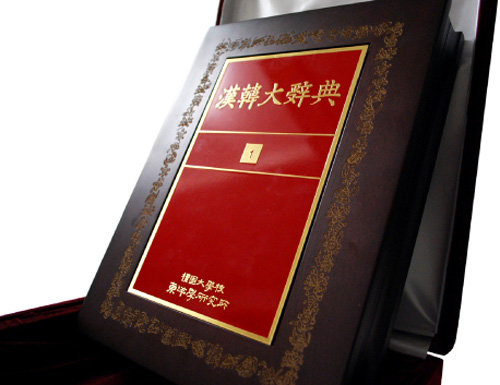

Korean name
- Hangul: 한한대사전
- Hanja: 漢韓大辭典
- RR: Han-Han daesajeon
- MR: Han-Han taesajŏn

Han-Han daesajeon (Korean: 한한대사전; Hanja: 漢韓大辭典) is the generic term for Korean hanja-to-hangul dictionaries. There are several such dictionaries from different publishers. The most comprehensive one, published by Dankook University Publishing, contains 53,667 Chinese characters and 420,269 compound words. This dictionary was a project of the Dankook University Institute of Oriental Studies, which started in June 1977 and was completed 28 October 2008, and cost 31 billion KRW, or US$25 million. The dictionary comprises 16 volumes (including an index volume) totalling over 20,000 pages.

In addition to the Han-Han Daesajeon, in 1966, Dankook University completed the "Dictionary of Korean Chinese Characters." Composed of 4 volumes with more than 4,410 pages, this dictionary "catalogs Chinese characters made and used only by our Korean ancestors (182 characters) as well as examples of Chinese words with Korean usages (84,000 words)."

== History ==
With no Chinese dictionaries with Korean translations, most Korean scholars were resigned to relying on Chinese dictionaries in foreign languages to interpret original Chinese texts. Dr. Choong-sik Chang, the president of Dankook University, brought Lee Hee-seung, the leading authority on Korean literature, to head Dankook's Institute of Oriental Studies. Scholars were invited as advisers in 1977 and as editors to start compilation in 1978. Initially, the university foundation turned down the project after financial difficulties, and concerned senior scholars tried to dissuade Chang from compiling the dictionary. In 2009, Dankook University presented the first complete edition of the Han-Han Daesajeon, or the "Great Chinese-Korean Dictionary". 200,000 people worked on the dictionary for 132,800 days, and scholars at Dankook continue to revise and add footnotes to the dictionary. The scale of the existing large Chinese character dictionaries of other countries is as follows: (Dankook University News cross reference)

- Comprehensive Dictionary of Chinese Words: 23,000 characters, 370,000 words, published in China
- Encyclopedic Dictionary of the Chinese Language: 50,000 characters, 400,000 words, published in Taiwan
- The Great Chinese–Japanese Dictionary (Japanese: 大漢和辞典): 50,305 characters, 540,000 words
- Great Compendium of Chinese Characters (Chinese: 汉语大字典) (Second Edition): 60,370 characters

== Others ==
Classical Chinese character dictionaries are an essential tool for accessing and understanding traditional humanities with a foundation in Chinese literature, not only in Chinese-speaking world but also in Korea, Japan and Vietnam. The first notable effort to compile a comprehensive classical Chinese character dictionary was made by Tetsuji Morohashi (1883–1982), a Japanese scholar. Tetsuji recognized the need and grew determined to compile a Chinese–Japanese Dictionary while studying abroad in China. Despite his manuscripts being burned in a fire during World War II, his publisher going bankrupt, and numerous other setbacks, after 32 years of collaborative work, the Dai Kan-Wa Jiten or "Great Chinese–Japanese Dictionary" was finally completed.

Taiwan's Defense Committee followed suit with a 10-year effort, along with the Academia Sinica, to complete the Zhongwen Da Cidian, or "Encyclopedic Dictionary of the Chinese Language." In 1975, China also made the compilation of a Chinese character dictionary a national project. Collaboration attracted the participation of 43 universities, as well as numerous research centers and scholars nationwide, yielding the 12 volume Hanyu Da Cidian or "Comprehensive Dictionary of Chinese Words" in 1993.

== See also ==
- Hanyu Da Zidian
- Zhonghua Da Zidian
