= Tetsuji Morohashi =

Japanese language scholar and Sinologist

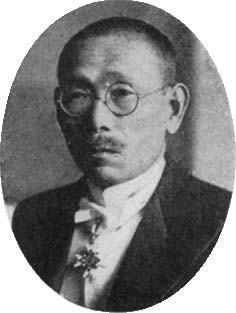
- Born: June 4, 1883; Sanjyo, Niigata, Japan
- Died: December 8, 1982 (aged 99)
- Other name: 諸橋 轍次
- Occupations: Japanese language studies and Sinology
- Relatives: Shinroku Morohashi (Third son)

Tetsuji Morohashi (諸橋 轍次, Morohashi Tetsuji; June 4, 1883 – December 8, 1982) was an important figure in the field of Japanese language studies and Sinology. He is best known as chief editor of the Dai Kan-Wa jiten, a comprehensive dictionary of Chinese characters, or kanji.

== Biography ==
=== His younger days ===
Tetsuji Morohashi was born at Sanjyo, Niigata prefecture. His father was a scholar of Kangaku and was a lover of poetry, especially Su Shi's poetry. His name, Tetsuji, is derived from the name of Su Shi's brother Zhe (轍, Japanese: Tetsu) and the suffix "ji" (Chinese: 次; pinyin: cì; lit. 'sub-', 'secondary'). He received higher education at École Normale Supérieure of Tokyo. After his graduation in 1908, he became a teacher at that school and taught Kangaku. In his younger days, he studied in China.

=== As sinologist ===
Tetsuji submitted his dissertation to the University of Tokyo in 1929. The title was "Purpose of Confucianism and activities of Confucians in Song dynasty: Especially from 1041 to 1200" (儒学の目的と宋儒(慶暦至慶元百六十年間)の活動). In 1930, he became a professor of the Tokyo Bunrika University. When he had stayed in China, he felt the need for a Kanji dictionary. The president of a publisher Taishukan Publishing also consulted a plan for a dictionary including all Kanji in 1925. Therefore, after submitting his dissertation, Tetsuji started writing and editing his ideal dictionary,"Dai Kan-Wa Jiten"(大漢和辞典). The first volume was published in 1943, and he received the Asahi Prize the next year by this achievement. During the Pacific War his editorial work largely halted. Completed drafts were waiting for printing in the Taishukan Publishing, but they were burned by the Bombing of Tokyo on 10 March 1945.

=== After the War ===
He was blinded in his right eye in 1946. His left eye also lost eyesight almost due to fatigue and the disorder of the war. He became a professor at Kokugakuin University in 1948, but retired the next year. In 1957, he assumed the president of Tsuru University (1957–1964).

He died in 1982. The Dr. Tetsuji Morohashi Museum (諸橋轍次記念館) is located in his hometown of Sanjō, Niigata, which is also known as the Kangaku no sato (漢学の里 "Home of Chinese Studies").

== Bibliography ==
- Great Chinese-Japanese Dictionary (大漢和辭典, Dai Kan-Wa jiten) (Great Chinese-Japanese Dictionary) Morohashi Tetsuji, ed. Tōkyō: Taishūkan shoten 大修館書店 .
  - 1943: Vol. I
  - 1955-1960: Vol. I revised & Vols. II-XIII.

== Honors ==
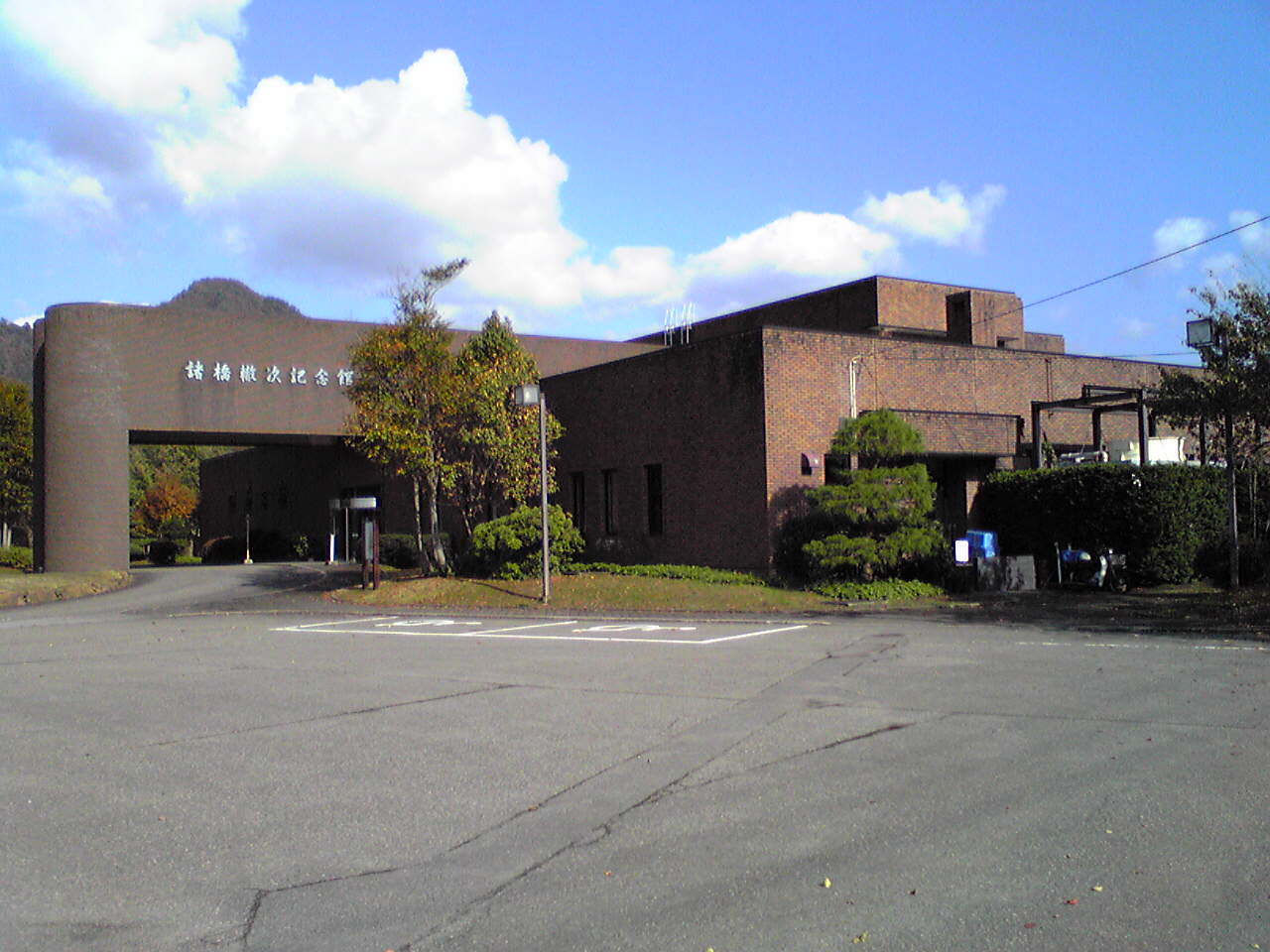
Tetsuji Morohashi Memorial Museum, in Sanjō, Niigata.

Morohashi was honored for contributions to sinology and lexicography.

- Order of the Chrysanthemum (1957)
- Order of Culture (1965)

== Relatives ==
- Wife: Kin Morohashi (諸橋キン)'s family was the rich merchant of Ojiya-chijimi ramie fabric.
- Third son: Shinroku Morohashi (諸橋 晋六) was a businessperson. He became a president of Mitsubishi Corporation, and received the First order of the Sacred Treasure and Order of the British Empire (UK)). He was also known as football player in his younger days.
- Cousin: Tongo Takebe (建部 遯吾) was a sociologist who taught at University of Tokyo. He was also a member of the House of Peers.
- great-grandniece: Sasha Morohashi Saputo.
