= Jiyun =

1037 Chinese rime dictionary

The Jiyun (Chi-yun; traditional Chinese: 集韻; simplified Chinese: 集韵; pinyin: Jíyùn; Wade–Giles: Chi^{2}-yün^{4}; lit. 'Collected Rimes') is a Chinese rime dictionary published in 1037 during the Song dynasty. The chief editor Ding Du (丁度) and others expanded and revised the Guangyun. It is possible, according to Teng and Biggerstaff (1971:147), that Sima Guang completed the text in 1067. The Jiyun has 53,525 character entries (Teng & Biggerstaff, 1971: 147), approximately twice as many as the Guangyun, and likewise has 206 rime groups.

== See also ==
- Rime dictionary
- Rime table
