= Hanyu Da Cidian =

Chinese phrase dictionary

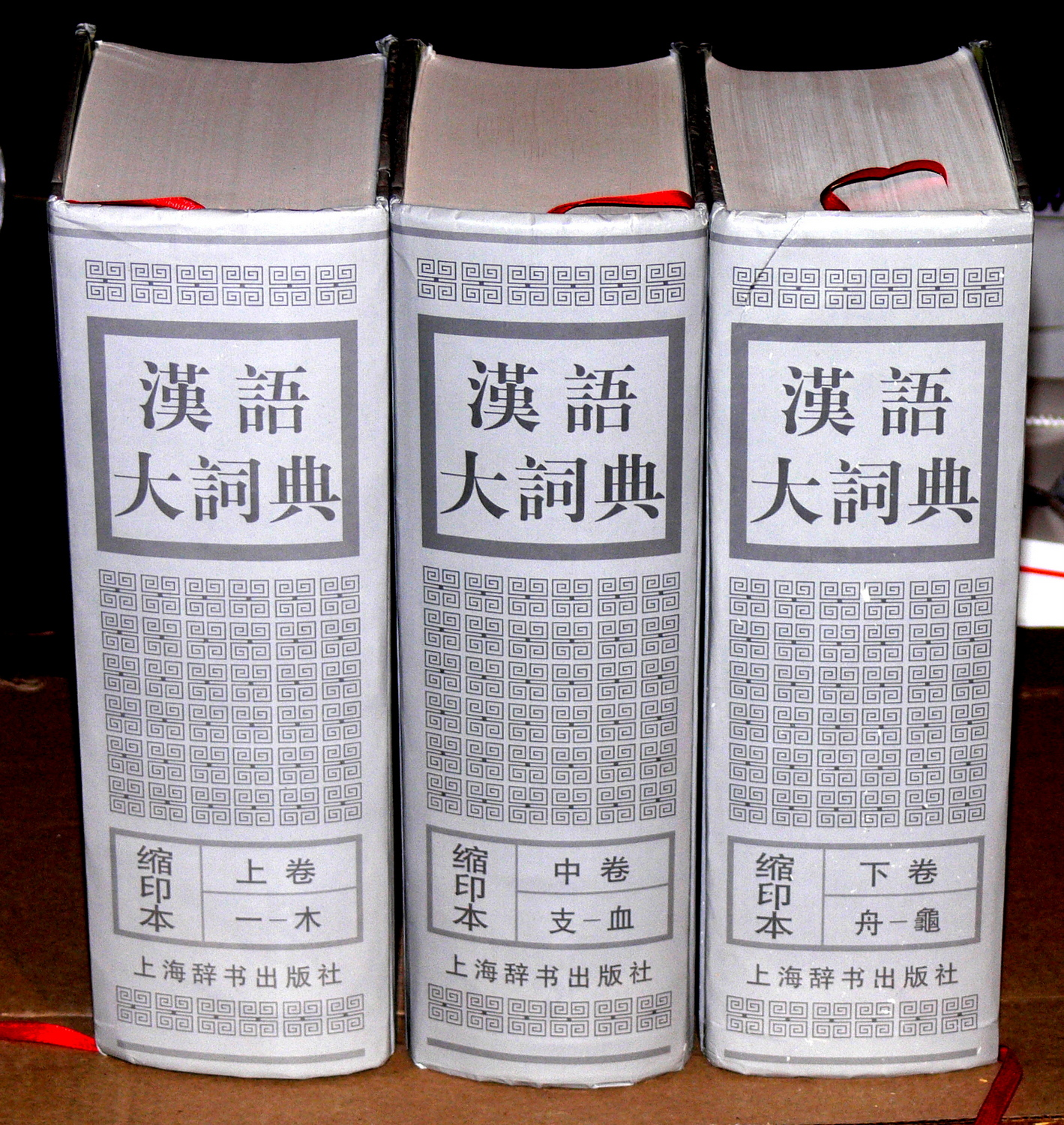
3 volumes of Hanyu Da Cidian

The Hanyu Da Cidian (traditional Chinese: 漢語大詞典; simplified Chinese: 汉语大词典; pinyin: Hànyǔ Dà Cídiǎn; lit. 'Comprehensive Chinese Word Dictionary'), also known as the Grand Chinese Dictionary, is the most inclusive available Chinese dictionary. Lexicographically comparable to the Oxford English Dictionary, it has diachronic coverage of the Chinese language, and traces usage over three millennia from Chinese classic texts to modern slang. The chief editor Luo Zhufeng (1911–1996), along with a team of over 300 scholars and lexicographers, started the enormous task of compilation in 1979. Publication of the thirteen volumes began with first volume in 1986 and ended with the appendix and index volume in 1994. In 1994, the dictionary also won the National Book Award of China.

The Hanyu Da Cidian includes over 23,000 head Chinese character entries, defines some 370,000 words, and gives 1,500,000 citations. The head entries, which are collated by a novel 200 radical system, are given in traditional Chinese characters while simplified Chinese characters are noted. Definitions and explanations are in simplified, excepting classical quotations.

Volume 13 has both pinyin and stroke count indexes, plus appendices. A separate index volume (1997) lists 728,000 entries for characters by their position within words and phrases, something like a reverse dictionary. For instance, the Hanyu da cidian enters Daode jing (道德經) under the head character dao; this reverse-index lists it under both de and jing. "Despite the fact that it weighs over 20 kilos and contains a total of 50 million characters spread over 20,000 large double-column pages," says Wilkinson, "the Hanyu da cidian is an easy dictionary to use to the full because it is unusually well indexed."

Hanyu Da Cidian was consulted in the writing of The First Series of Standardized Forms of Words with Non-standardized Variant Forms.

== Publications ==
=== Hanyu Da Cidian ===
- 1st edition
  - Mainland edition (1986–1994): 13 volumes, vol. 1 published by Shanghai Lexicographical Publishing House (上海辞书出版社), and vols. 2–13 published by Hanyu Da Cidian Publishing House (汉语大词典出版社):
    - Vol. 1 (一 through 人): 1st impression, 上海辞书出版社, November 1986 (no ISBN)
    - Vol. 2 (八 through 小): 1st impression, 汉语大词典出版社, March 1988 (ISBN 7-5432-0001-5)
    - Vol. 3 (口 through 彐): 1st impression, 汉语大词典出版社, March 1989 (ISBN 7-5432-0002-3, misprinted as "7-5432-0001-5" in the book)
    - Vol. 4 (尸 through 支): 1st impression, 汉语大词典出版社, November 1989 (ISBN 7-5432-0003-1)
    - Vol. 5 (犬 through 水): 1st impression, 汉语大词典出版社, June 1990 (ISBN 7-5432-0004-X)
    - Vol. 6 (水 through 方): 1st impression, 汉语大词典出版社, December 1990 (ISBN 7-5432-0005-8)
    - Vol. 7 (火 through 矢): 1st impression, 汉语大词典出版社, June 1991 (ISBN 7-5432-0006-6)
    - Vol. 8 (禾 through 血): 1st impression, 汉语大词典出版社, December 1991 (ISBN 7-5432-0007-4)
    - Vol. 9 (舟 through 酉): 1st impression, 汉语大词典出版社, June 1992 (ISBN 7-5432-0008-2)
    - Vol. 10 (辰 through 角): 1st impression, 汉语大词典出版社, December 1992 (ISBN 7-5432-0009-0)
    - Vol. 11 (言 through 金): 1st impression, 汉语大词典出版社, June 1993 (ISBN 7-5432-0010-4, misprinted as "7-5432-0010-8" in the book)
    - Vol. 12 (門 through 龜): 1st impression, 汉语大词典出版社, November 1993 (ISBN 7-5432-0011-2)
    - Vol. 13 (appendices and indices): 1st impression, 汉语大词典出版社, April 1994 (ISBN 7-5432-0012-0, misprinted as "7-5432-0010-4" in the book)
  - Collector's edition (ISBN 7-5432-0013-9): Published by Joint Publishing (Hong Kong) Company Limited. 13 volumes.
    - ?th impression (1995-11-01)
  - Compact edition (ISBN 978-7-5432-0014-2): 3 volumes.
    - ?th impression (1997-04)
  - Simplified edition (漢語大詞典簡編): Includes over 20,000 head characters, 200,000 words. 2 volumes.
    - 3-volume edition (ISBN 7-5432-0304-9/ISBN 978-7-5432-0015-9):
      - ?th impression (1999-06-01)
    - 2-volume edition (ISBN 7-5432-0015-5): 1 impression, 1 edition.
      - ?th impression (2000-02-01)
  - Popular edition (漢語大詞典 普及本) (ISBN 7-5432-0396-0)
    - ?th impression (2000-08-01)
- 2nd edition: Originally announced in 2012, the publication was to begin in 2015, with all 25 volumes to be completed in 2020. The complete set would include about 60 million characters.

=== Hanyu Da Cidian by Shanghai Lexicographical Publishing House ===
- 1st edition
  - correction volume (漢語大詞典 訂補) (ISBN 7-5326-3236-9/ISBN 978-7-5326-3236-7): Includes over 30,000 entries. 1 volume.
    - ?th impression (2010-12-??)
  - Popular edition (漢語大詞典 普及本) (ISBN 7-5326-3618-6/ISBN 978-7-5326-3618-1/H.494): Includes over 200,000 entries.
    - ?th impression (2012-03-01)
  - Compact edition (漢語大詞典 縮印版) (ISBN 7-5326-2408-0/ISBN 978-7-5326-2408-9/H.331): Based on the 12-volume edition. Includes over 370,000 entries, over 23,000 head characters, 347,426 compound words. 3 volumes.
    - ?th impression (2007-12-01)
    - ?th impression (2008-04-01)
  - 22-volume edition (漢語大詞典) (ISBN 978-7-5326-2523-9): 22 volumes.
    - ?th impression (2008-08-??)
  - 23-volume edition (漢語大詞典) (ISBN 978-7-5326-2782-0): 23 volumes (12+1 index+14 addition).
    - ?th impression (2011-06-01)

=== Hanyu Da Cidian by Joint Publishing (Hong Kong) Company Limited ===
- 1st edition
  - Volume 1 (漢語大詞典 1) (ISBN 9-620-40541-2/ISBN 978-9-620-40541-9)
    - ?th impression (1995-07-01)
  - Volume 2 (漢語大詞典 2) (ISBN 9-620-40542-0/ISBN 978-9-620-40542-6)
    - ?th impression (1995-07-01)
  - Volume 3 (漢語大詞典 3) (ISBN 9-620-40543-9/ISBN 978-9-620-40543-3)
    - ?th impression (1989-10-01)
  - Volume 4 (漢語大詞典 4) (ISBN 9-620-40544-7/ISBN 978-9-620-40544-0)
    - ?th impression (1990-04-01)
  - Volume 5 (漢語大詞典 5) (ISBN 9-620-40545-5/ISBN 978-9-620-40545-7)
    - ?th impression (1990-10-01)
  - Volume 6 (漢語大詞典 6) (ISBN ?/ISBN ?)
    - ?th impression (????-??-??)
  - Volume 7 (漢語大詞典 7) (ISBN 9-620-40547-1/ISBN 978-9-620-40547-1)
    - ?th impression (1992-03-01)
  - Volume 8 (漢語大詞典 8) (ISBN 9-620-40548-X/ISBN 978-9-620-40548-8)
    - ?th impression (1992-08-01)
  - Volume 9 (漢語大詞典 9) (ISBN 9-620-40549-8/ISBN 978-9-620-40549-5)
    - ?th impression (1993-04-01)
  - Volume 10 (漢語大詞典 10) (ISBN 9-620-40550-1/ISBN 978-9-620-40550-1)
    - ?th impression (1993-08-01)
  - Volume 11 (漢語大詞典 11) (ISBN 9-620-40551-X/ISBN 978-9-620-40551-8)
    - ?th impression (1994-01-01)
  - Volume 12 (漢語大詞典 12) (ISBN 9-620-40552-8/ISBN 978-9-620-40552-5)
    - ?th impression (1994-08-01)
  - Appendix/index (漢語大詞典 (附錄‧索引)) (ISBN 9-620-40553-6/ISBN 978-9-620-40553-2)
    - ?th impression (1995-03-01)
  - Overseas edition (ISBN 9-620-40541-2-S): 13 volumes (12+1 appendix/index).
    - ?th impression (1995-07-01)

=== Hanyu Da Cidian by Tung Hua Book Co. ===
- 1st edition: Changes from Chinese Dictionary Publishing House version include omission of simplified Chinese forms in the head character, addition of Mandarin phonetic symbols for pronunciations.
  - 12-volume edition (漢語大詞典/漢語大詞典 (十二卷式)) (ISBN 978-957636542-3): Includes over 50,000 characters, over 370,000 entries, 2,253 coloured pictures. 13(12+1 index) volumes.
    - ?th impression (1997-09-01)
    - ?th impression (2004-04-01)

=== Optical disc editions ===
The abridged CD-ROM version (2.0) contains 18,013 head characters, 336,385 words and phrases (without pinyin), and 861,956 citations. It includes male and female sound files for single-syllable pronunciation, and enables more than 20 search methods. It requires Microsoft Windows, with a Chinese locale setting due to its use of GB 18030.

The 3.0 CD-ROM version was released in 2007. This version includes SecuROM DRM copy protection software in its installation, possibly in response to the earlier version's ISO image being illegally distributed on VeryCD. Due to design errors, the 2007 version of 3.0 is incompatible with Windows 7 OS; rather than release a free software patch to fix the problem, the publisher began selling an otherwise unchanged, full-price Windows 7-compatible version of 3.0 in 2010.

- 1st edition: Based on the 12-volume edition.
  - Simplified Chinese optical disc 1.0 (漢語大詞典1.0版 CD-ROM) (ISBN 962-07-0209-3/ISBN 978-962-07-0209-9): Published by The Commercial Press (Beijing). Includes 27,986 head letters, 343,470 compound words, 23,650 idioms, 512,000 explanations, over 400,000 Chinese characters information, 520 black and white pictures, over 20 search methods. Supports Simplified Chinese Windows 95.
    - ?th impression (1998-10-??)
  - Traditional Chinese optical disc 1.0 (Hanyu Da Cidian CD-ROM Traditional Version/漢語大詞典 光碟繁體版):
    - Single-user edition (ISBN 962-07-0209-3)
      - 1st impression (????-??-??)
    - Network business version (ISBN 962-07-0234-4/ISBN 978-962-07-0234-1)
      - ?th impression (????-??-??)
    - Network education version (《漢語大詞典》光盤繁體網絡1.0版(教育版)/《漢語大詞典》繁體網絡1.0版(教育版)) (ISBN 962-07-0226-3/ISBN 978-962-07-0226-6): Supports Windows 95 Traditional Chinese version. Server supports Windows NT 4.0.
      - ?th impression (1999-??-??)
  - Simplified Chinese 2.0: Includes 20,902 head letters, 343,307 compound words, 23,649 idioms, 515,524 explanations, 877,130 examples, 519 black and white pictures. Supports Windows 95 and above.
  - Traditional Chinese optical disc 2.0: Includes 18,014 head letters, 336,690 compound words, 23,383 idioms, 504,042 explanations, 861,956 examples, over 230,000 Chinese characters information, 515 black and white pictures, over 20 search methods. Supports Windows XP.
    - 1-user edition (Hanyu Da Cidian CD-ROM Traditional Version 2.0/漢語大詞典 光碟繁體單機2.0版) (ISBN 962-07-0255-7/ISBN 978-962-07-0255-6)
      - ?th impression (2003-07-??)
    - 5 users edition (ISBN 962-07-0267-0/ISBN 978-962-07-0267-9)
      - ?th impression (2006-01-??)
    - 10 users edition (ISBN 200315115-X/ISBN 978-200315115-6)
      - ?th impression (2006-01-??)
    - 15 users edition (ISBN 200315116-8/ISBN 978-200315116-3)
      - ?th impression (2006-01-??)
    - 20 users edition (ISBN 200315117-6/ISBN 978-200315117-0)
      - ?th impression (2006-01-??)
    - 25 users edition (ISBN 200315118-4/ISBN 978-200315118-7)
      - ?th impression (2006-01-??)
    - 30 users edition (ISBN 200315280-6/ISBN 978-200315280-1)
      - ?th impression (2006-01-??)
    - 50 users edition (ISBN 200315281-4/ISBN 978-200315281-8)
      - ?th impression (2006-01-??)
    - 70 users edition (ISBN 200315282-2/ISBN 978-200315282-5)
      - ?th impression (2006-01-??)
  - Traditional Chinese optical disc 3.0 (《漢語大詞典》光盤): Includes 18,014 head letters, 23,383 idioms, 861,956 examples, over 20 search methods. Supports Windows 2000 or later. Existing 2.0 users could obtain an upgrade to 3.0 single-user edition. Changes from 2.0 include text lookup for Microsoft Office, Internet Explorer, and other document formats from running software (except PDF); addition of context menu, HTML rendering engine, Unicode support. Messages can be displayed in GBK, BIG5, or Unicode format. Software is based on Microsoft .Net Framework 2.0.
    - 1-user edition (Hanyu Da Cidian CD-ROM Traditional Version 3.0/漢語大詞典 光碟繁體單機3.0版) (ISBN 962-07-0277-8/ISBN 978-962-07-0277-8)
      - ?th impression (2007-07-01)
      - ?th impression (2014-01-??)

=== Network editions ===
Network version is maintained by EWEN? (上海数字世纪网络有限公司).

- 1.0 (《漢語大詞典》1.0網絡版): Includes 15 million characters.
- 2.0 (《漢語大詞典》2.0網絡版): Includes 50 million characters.
- 2.1 (《漢語大詞典》2.1網絡版): Includes ?.

== See also ==
- Dai Kan-Wa Jiten, of Japanese kanji
- Han-Han Dae Sajeon, of Korean hanja
- Hanyu Da Zidian
- Zhongwen Da Cidian
