= Hanyu Da Zidian =

Chinese character dictionary (1986–1989)

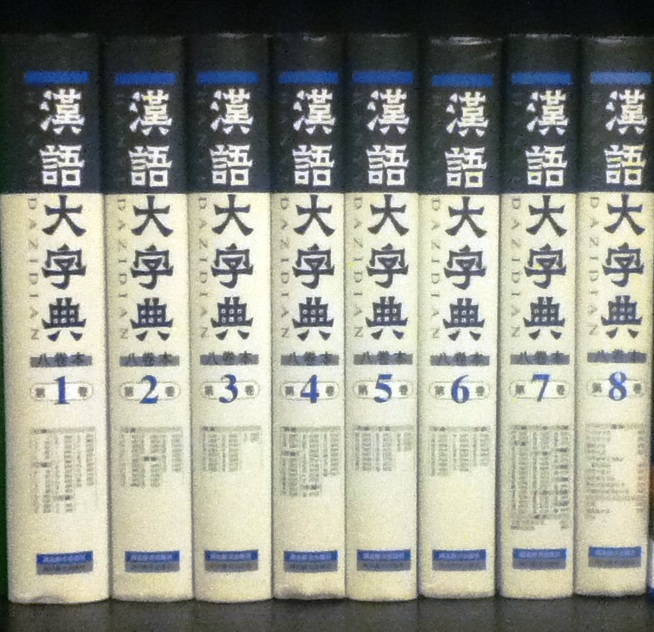
2006 edition

The Hanyu Da Zidian (simplified Chinese: 汉语大字典; traditional Chinese: 漢語大字典; pinyin: Hànyǔ dàzìdiǎn; lit. 'Great Compendium of Chinese Characters'), also known as the Grand Chinese Dictionary, is a reference dictionary on Chinese characters.

== Overview ==
A group of more than 400 editors and lexicographers began compilation in 1974, and it was published in eight volumes from 1986 to 1989. A separate volume of essays documents the lexicographical complexities for this full-scale Chinese dictionary. Besides the weighty 5,790-page first edition, there are 3-volume (1995) and pocket editions. A second edition (pictured at right) was published in 2006, and has a list of radicals printed on the dust jacket of each volume for quicker character look up.

The first edition of the Hanyu Da Zidian included 54,678 head entries for characters, and this was expanded to 60,370 in the second edition, published in 2010. They give historical logographic forms such as oracle bone script, bronzeware script, and seal script. Pronunciation is glossed for Old Chinese (Shijing rhyme group), Middle Chinese (fanqie spelling), and Modern Standard Chinese (pinyin). The chronologically numbered definitions cite early Chinese dictionaries (especially the Shuowen Jiezi) and classic texts. Internal collation is by a 200 radical system, arranged by stroke count. Volume 8 has appendices, including rime tables for Old and Middle Chinese, variant characters, indexes, and addenda.

The Hanyu Da Zidian has become the international standard reference for Chinese characters; for example, the Unihan Database and Wiktionary cite (volume/page/entry) references.

== See also ==
- Dai Kan-Wa jiten
- Han-Han Dae Sajeon
- Hanyu Da Cidian
- Kangxi Zidian
- Zhonghua Da Zidian
