= Jiaolong =

Dragon in Chinese mythology

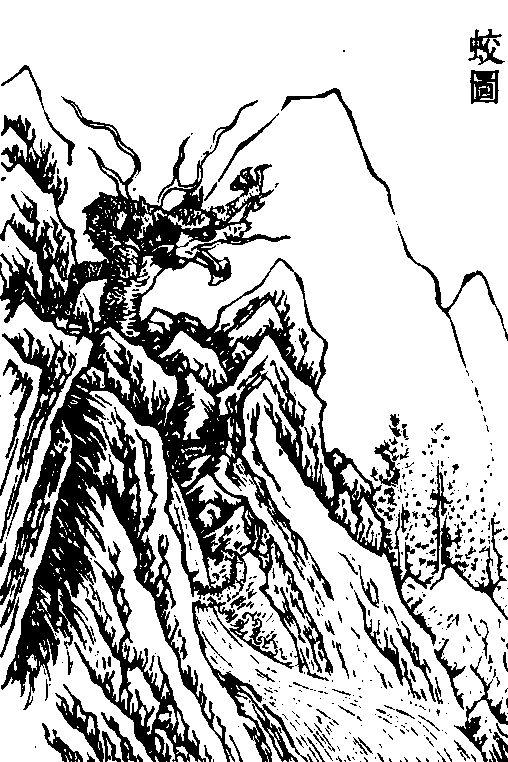
Jiao 蛟 illustration from the 1725 Gujin Tushu Jicheng

Jiaolong (traditional Chinese: 蛟龍; simplified Chinese: 蛟龙; pinyin: jiāolóng; Wade–Giles: chiao-lung) or jiao (chiao, kiao) is a serpent-like dragon in Chinese mythology, often defined as a "scaled dragon"; it is hornless according to certain scholars and said to be aquatic or river-dwelling. It may have referred to a species of crocodile.

A number of scholars point to non-Sinitic southern origins for the legendary creature and ancient texts chronicle that the Yue people once tattooed their bodies to ward against these monsters.

In English translations, jiao has been variously rendered as "jiao-dragon", "crocodile", "flood dragon", "scaly dragon", or even "kraken".

== Name ==
The jiao 蛟 character combines the "insect radical" 虫, to provide general sense of insects, reptiles or dragons, (Note: For example, shen 蜃 or mirage dragon and hong 虹) or rainbow dragon.) etc., and the right radical jiao 交 "cross; mix", etc. which supplies the phonetic element "jiao". The original 交 pictograph represented a person with crossed legs.

The Japanese equivalent term is kōryō or kōryū (蛟竜). (Note: But the single kanji character 蛟 can also be read Japanese-style (kun'yomi) as "mizuchi" which denotes a Japanese river dragon) The Vietnamese equivalent is giao long, considered synonymous to Vietnamese Thuồng luồng.

=== Synonyms ===
The Piya dictionary (11th century) claims that its common name was maban (馬絆).

The jiao is also claimed to be equivalent to Sanskrit 宮毗羅 (modern Chinese pronunciation gongpiluo) in the 7th-century Buddhist dictionary Yiqiejing yinyi. (Note: The Buddhist dictionary purports to quote the Baopuzi 抱朴子.) The same Sanskrit equivalent is repeated in the widely used Bencao Gangmu or Compendium of Materia Medica. In Buddhist texts this word occurs as names of divine beings, (Note: The transliterations 宮毗羅 and 宮毘羅 are interchangeable. The characters "毗" and "毘" are variants of each other.) (Note: 宮毘羅 (Japanese:Kubira) is attested in eastern Buddhist writings, as one of the Twelve Heavenly Generals. Cf. the Guardian Deity Kimbila (pinyin: Jinpiluo wang) who is one of the Twenty-eight Guardians.) and the Sanskrit term in question is actually kumbhīra (कुम्भीर). As a common noun kumbhīra means "crocodile".

=== Phonology ===
Schuessler reconstructs Later Han Chinese kau and Old Chinese *krâu for modern jiao 蛟. Pulleyblank provides Early Middle Chinese kaɨw/kɛːw and Late Middle Chinese kjaːw.

The form kău is used as the Tang period pronunciation by American sinologist Edward H. Schafer. The transliteration kiao lung was given by Dutch orientalist Marinus Willem de Visser's book on dragons.

=== Etymology ===
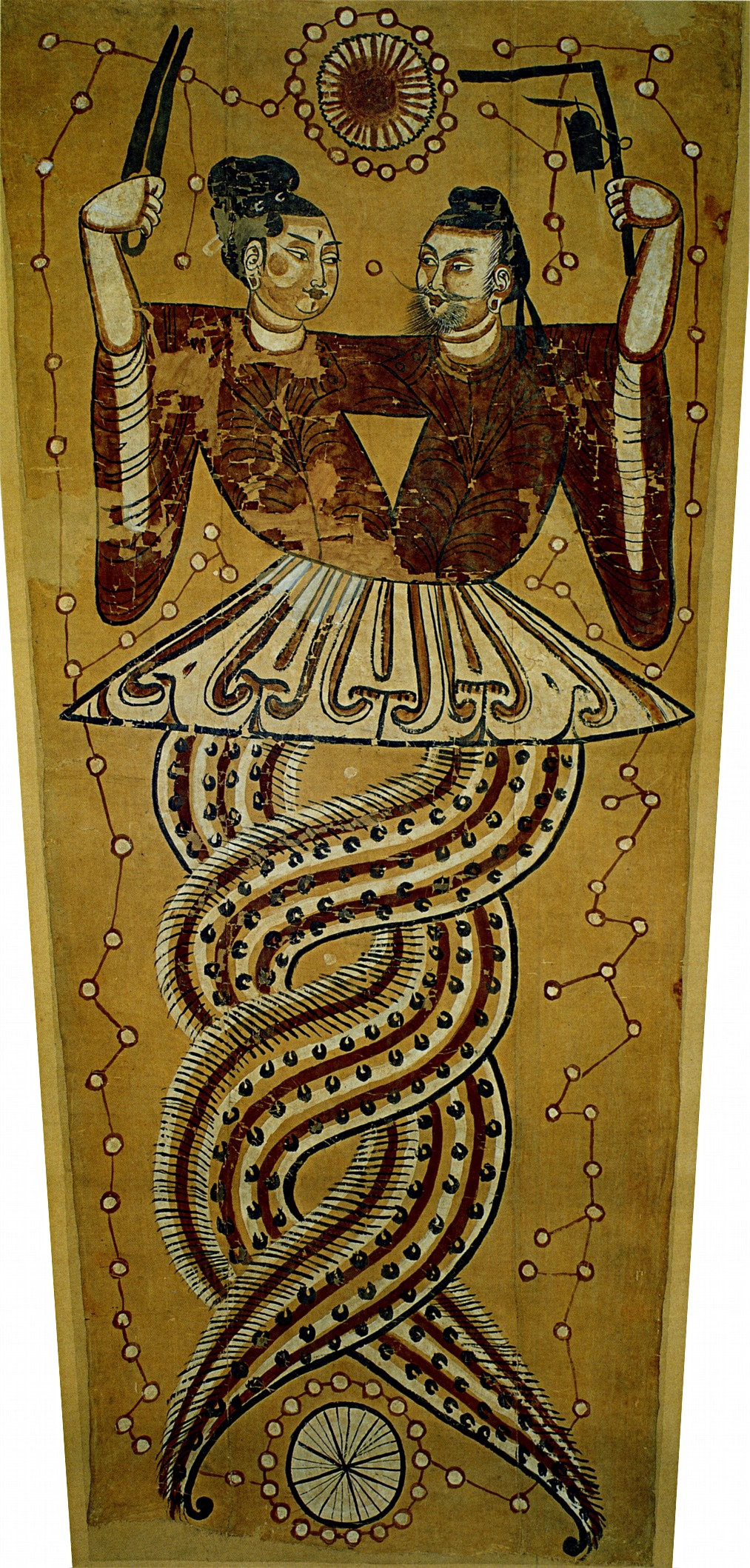
Nüwa and Fuxi. Tomb painting excavated in Xinjiang.

Jiao's (蛟) etymology is obscure. Michael Carr, using Bernhard Karlgren's reconstruction of Old Chinese *kǒg 蛟, explains.

Most etymologies for jiao < *kǒg 蛟 are unsupported speculations upon meanings of its phonetic *kǒg 交 'cross; mix with; contact', e.g., the *kǒg 蛟 dragon can *kǒg 交 'join' its head and tail in order to capture prey, or moves in a *kǒg 交 'twisting' manner, or has *kǒg 交 'continuous' eyebrows. The only corroborated hypothesis takes *kǒg 交 'breed with' to mean *kǒg 蛟 indicates a dragon 'crossbreed; mixture'. (1990:126-7)

The word has "mermaid" as one possible gloss, and Schuessler suggests possible etymological connections with Burmese k^{h}ru^{B} or k^{h}yu^{B} "scaly, furry beast" and Tibetan klu "nāga; water spirits", albeit the Tibeto-Burman are phonologically distant from OC.

Crossed eyebrows

The explanation that its name comes from eyebrows that "cross over" (交 jiao) is given in the ancient text Shuyi ji "Records of Strange Things" (6th century). (Note: Shuyi Ji , quoted in the Bencao Gangmu. The passage is quoted below.) (Note: The same is stated in the aforementioned Piya, but translated differently as eyebrows that are "united" (交 jiao) in Visser's excerpt.)

Early sense as mating dragons

It has been suggested that jiaolong might have referred to a pair of dragons mating, with their long bodies coiled around each other (Wen Yiduo 2001a:95–96 (Note: Wen 2001a:95-96 apud Wang 2015).))

Thus in the legend around the jiaolong 蛟龍 hovering above the mother giving birth to a future emperor i.e., Liu Bang, the founding emperor of Han, r. 202-195 BCE (Note: The dragon supposedly witness by the father Taigong (T'ai-kung.)) (Sima Qian, Records of the Grand Historian), the alternative conjectural interpretation is that it was a pair of mating dragons.

The same legend occurs in nearly verbatim copy in the Book of Han, except that the dragons are given as 交龍 "crossed dragons". Wen noted that in early use jiaolong 交龍 "crossed dragons" was emblematic of the mythological creators Fuxi and Nüwa, who are represented as having a human's upper body and a dragon's tail.

=== Semantics ===
In textual usage, it may be ambiguous whether jiaolong 蛟龍 should be parsed as two kinds of dragons or one, as Prof. Zhang Jing (known in Japan as Chō Kyō) comments: "It is difficult to determine whether jiaolong is the name of a type of dragon, or [two dragons] ' jiao' and 'long' juxtaposed". (Note: Japanese: "蛟龍はそもそも龍の一種の名称なのか、それとも「蛟」と「龍」からなる複合なのかは判断しにくい".)

Zhang cites as one example of jiaolong used in the poem Li Sao (in Chu Ci), in which the poet is instructed by supernatural beings to beckon the jialong and bid them build a bridge. Visser translated this as one type of dragon, the jiaolong or kiao-lung. However, it was the verdict of Wang Yi, an early commentator of this poem that these were two kinds, the smaller jiao and the larger long.

=== Translations ===
Since the Chinese word for the generic dragon is long (龍), translating jiao as "dragon" is problematic as it would make it impossible to distinguish which of the two is being referred to. The term jiao has thus been translated as "flood dragon" or "scaly dragon", with some qualifier to indicate it as a subtype. But on this matter, Schafer has suggested using a name for various dragon-like beings such as "kraken" to stand for jiao:

The word "dragon" has already been appropriated to render the broader term lung. "Kraken" is good since it suggests a powerful oceanic monster. ... We might name the kău a "basilisk" or a "wyvern" or a "cockatrice." Or perhaps we should call it by the name of its close kin, the double-headed crocodile-jawed Indian makara, which, in ninth-century Java at least, took on some of the attributes of the rain-bringing lung of China. (1967:218)

As for using Sanskrit makara as a loanword translation, it has already been noted that Sanskrit kumbhīra was glossed as jiao in a 7th century Buddhist dictionary (cf. § Synonyms above).

Some translators have in fact adopted "kraken" as the translated term, as Schafer has suggested.

In some contexts, jiao has also been translated as "crocodile" (Note: Birrell 2000, pp. 93, 97 also renders as "alligator"; but her endnote (p. 198) indicates "alligator" was meant to be reserved for a different creature, the t'o (tuo 鼉), which conforms with Read tr. 1934, p. 300 and Fauvel 1879, p. 8.) (See §Identification as real fauna).

== Attestations ==
=== Classification and life cycle ===
The Shuowen Jiezi dictionary (121 CE) glosses the jiao as "a type of dragon (long), as does the Piya dictionary (11th c.), which adds that the jiao are oviparous (hatch from eggs). The Bencao Gangmu states this also, but also notes this is generally true of most scaled creatures.

Jiao eggs are about the size of a jar of 1 or 2 hu capacity in Chinese volume measurement, according to Guo Pu's commentary; a variant text states that the hatchlings are of this size. It was considered that while the adult jiao lies in pools of water, their eggs hatched on dry land, more specifically on mounds of earth (Huainanzi).

The jiao did eventually metamorphose into a form built to fly, according to Ren Fang's Shuyi ji ("Records of Strange Things"), which said that "a water snake (hui 虺) after 500 years transforms into a jiao (蛟); a jiao after a millennium into a dragon (long), a long after 500 years a horned dragon (角龍), a horned dragon after a millennium into a yinglong (a winged dragon)". (Note: Compare the explanation that "smaller ones are called jiao and larger ones are called long (dragon)" by Wang Yi (d. 158 CE) in his commentary to the poem Li Sao in the Chu Ci.)

=== General descriptions ===
The hujiao 虎蛟 or "tiger jiao" (Note: Visser renders as "tiger kiao". Birrell renders as "tiger-crocodiles".) are described as creatures with a body like a fish and a tail like a snake, which made noise like mandarin ducks. Although this might be considered a subtype of the jiao dragon, a later commentator thought this referred to a type of fish (see #Sharks and rays section).

The foregoing account occurs in the early Chinese bestiary Shanhaijing "Classic of Mountains and Seas" (completed c. 206–9 BCE), in its first book "Classic of the Southern Mountains". (Note: Shanhaijing Book 1.III) (Note: As to habitat, these tiger jiao were said to inhabit the Yin River (泿水, "River Bank") which flows southward from Mt. Daoguo 禱過山. Birrel renders Yin River as "River Bank" and the mountain as "Mount Prayerpass". Visser mis-transcribes as "浪水" and renders as "water come forth in waves" "out of the Tao Kuo mountains".)

The bestiary's fifth book, "Classic of the Central Mountains" (Note: Shanhaijing Book 5.XI) records the presence of jiao in the Kuang River (貺水, "River Grant") and Lun River (淪水, "River Ripple"). (Note: Birrell renders jiao here as "alligators" which is misleading since in the endnotes she glosses alligator as t'o (i.e. tuo 鼉). Cf. Read tr. 1934, p. 300, table. "Chiao Lung 蛟龍 Crocodiles" and "T'o Lung 鼍龍 Alligators") Guo Pu (d. 324)'s commentary to Part XI glosses jiao as "a type of [long 龍] dragon that resembles a four-legged snake". Guo adds that the jiao possesses a "small head and a narrow neck with a white goiter" and that it is oviparous, and "large ones were more than ten arm spans in width (Note: Although it is being translated as a measure of width, wei 圍 is actually a measure of perimeter.) and could swallow a person whole".

A description similar to this is found in the Piya dictionary, but instead of a white "goiter (ying)" being found on its neck, a homophone noun of a different meaning is described, rendered "white necklace" around its neck by Visser. Other sources concurs with the latter word meaning white "necklace" (or variously translated as white "tassels"), namely, the Bencao Gangmu quoting at length from Guangzhou Ji (廣州記) by Pei Yuan (裴淵, 317–420): (Note: A white "goiter" (癭; ying) in the Classic of Mountains and Seas; a white "necklace" or "tassels" (嬰; ying) in Piya and the Bencao Gangmu.)

蛟長丈餘，似蛇而四足，形廣如楯, 小頭細頸，頸有白嬰。胸前赭色, 背上靑斑, 脇邊若錦, 尾有肉環,

— Li Shizhen 1596 "(Animals with) Scales I, jiaolong, "Collected Explanations【集解】" subsection
Translation:

The jiao measures 10 chi or more in length. Snake-like in appearance, but it has four feet. The shape broad and shield-like, it is small-headed and thin-necked. On the neck there are white tassels. Its chest is sienna brown and its back flecked with blue-green spots. Its flanks resemble brocade-work. On its tail there are fleshy rings. The largest attain several arms' spans around.

— adapted from Luo tr. 2003, p. 3508. "Vol. 43: The Category of Animals with Scales", Bencao Gangmu.

A later text described jiao as a beast that "looks like a snake with a tiger head, is several fathoms long, lives in brooks and rivers, and bellows like a bull; when it sees a human being it traps him with its stinking saliva, then pulls him into the water and sucks his blood from his armpits". This description, in the Moke huixi 墨客揮犀 (Note: By Peng Cheng (Song dynasty).) (11th century CE), was considered the "best definition" of a jiao by Wolfram Eberhard.

=== Scales ===
The description as "scaly" or "scaled dragon" is found in some medieval texts, and quoted in several near-modern references and dictionaries.

The Guangya (3rd century CE) defines jiaolong as "scaly dragon; scaled dragon", using the word lin 鱗 "scales". The paragraph, which goes on to list other types of dragons, was quoted in the Kangxi Dictionary compiled during the Manchurian Qing dynasty. A similar paragraph occurs in the Shuyi ji (6th century) and quoted in the Bencao Gangmu aka Compendium of Materia Medica:

蛟龍.. 【釋名】時珍曰︰按任昉《述異記》云, 蛟乃龍屬, 其眉交生, 故謂之蛟, 有鱗曰蛟龍, 有翼曰應龍, 有角曰虯龍, 無角曰螭龍也。

— Li Shizhen 1596 "(Animals with) Scales I, jiaolong
Translation:

Jiaolong.. [Explanation of Names] [Li] Shizhen says: The book Shuyi Ji by Ren Fang:: The jiao is a kind of dragon. As its eyebrows cross each other, it is called jiaolong. (jiao ≅ come across). The jiaolong has scales. The variety with wings is called yinglong. The variety with horns is called qiulong. The variety without horns is called chilong ... (Note: The quote here is slightly modified, as per capitalization, etc., from Luo's rendition.)

— Luo tr. 2003, p. 3508. "Vol. 43: The Category of Animals with Scales", Bencao Gangmu.

=== Aquatic nature ===
Several texts allude to the jiao being the lord of aquatic beings. The jiaolong is called the "god of the water animals". (Note: Commentary to Guanzi;) (Note: The thrust of the original passage in the philosophical work is that circumstances dictate, or more specifically, a dragon (or tiger, etc.) can manifest its full power when it is in its elements.) The Shuowen jieji dictionary (beginning of 2nd c.) states that if the number of fish in a pond reaches 3600, a jiao will come as their leader, and enable them to follow him and fly away". However, "if you place a fish trap in the water, the jiao will leave". A similar statement occurs in the farming almanac Qimin Yaoshu (6th c.) that quotes the Yangyu-jing "Classic on Raising Fish", a manual on pisciculture ascribed to Lord Tao Zhu (Fan Li). According to this Yangyu-jing version, when the fish count reaches 360, the jiao will lead them away, but this could be prevented by keeping bie 鱉 (variant character 鼈, "soft-shelled turtle"). (Note: The Yangyu-jing is also quoted in the Qing period encyclopedia Yuanjian Leihan 淵鑑類函 according to Minakata.)

Jiao and jiaolong were names for a legendary river dragon. Jiao 蛟 is sometimes translated as "flood dragon". The (c. 1105 CE) Yuhu qinghua 玉壺清話 Carr says people in the southern state of Wu called it fahong 發洪 "swell into a flood" because they believed flooding resulted when jiao hatched. The poem Qijian ("Seven Remonstrances") in the Chu Ci uses the term shuijiao 水蛟 or water jiao. (Note: "Henceforth the water-serpents must be my companions, And dragon-spirits lie with me when I would rest".)

=== Hornlessness ===
The Shuowen Jiezi does not commit to whether the jiāo 蛟 has or lacks a horn. (Note: It defines chi 螭 as hornless and qiú 虯 as horned.) However the definition was emended to "hornless dragon" by Duan Yucai in his 19th-century edited version.( A somewhat later commentary by Zhu Junsheng stated the contrary; in his Shuowen tongxun dingsheng (説文通訓定聲) Zhu Junsheng explained that only male dragons (long) were horned, and "among dragon offspring, the one-horned are called jiāo 蛟, the bicorned are called qiú 虯, and the hornless are called chì 螭.

Note the pronunciation similarity between jiāo 蛟 and jiǎo 角 "horn", thus jiǎolóng 角龍 is "horned dragon". (Note: An example occurs in Ge Hong's Baopuzi (10, tr. Ware 1966:170) "the horned dragon can no longer find a place to swim". The Jiǎolóng 角龍 "horned dragon" is also the modern Chinese name for the Ceratops dinosaur.)

=== Female gender ===
Lexicographers have noticed that according to some sources, the jiao was a dragoness, that is, a dragon of exclusively female gender. (Note: Carr gives 7 definitions as follows: "Jiao < *kǒg 蛟 is defined with more meanings than any other Chinese draconym", writes Carr (1990:126), "(1) 'aquatic dragon', (2) 'crocodile; alligator', (3) 'hornless dragon', (4) 'dragoness', (5) 'scaled dragon', ( 6 ) 'shark' [= 鮫], and (7) 'mermaid'".)

Jiao as female dragon occurs in the glossing of jiao 蛟 as "dragon mother" (perhaps "dragoness" or "she-dragon") in the (c. 649 CE) Buddhist dictionary Yiqiejing yinyi, (Note: 25 volumes were compiled by Xuanying 玄応. Later, an expanded 100 volume edition Yiqiejing Yinyi (Huilin) was compiled by Huilin 慧琳 (c. 807).) and the gloss is purported to be a direct quote from Ge Hong (d. 343)'s Baopuzi 抱朴子. However, extant editions of the Baopuzi does not include this statement. The (11th century CE) Piya dictionary repeats this "female dragon" definition.

=== Records of hunt ===
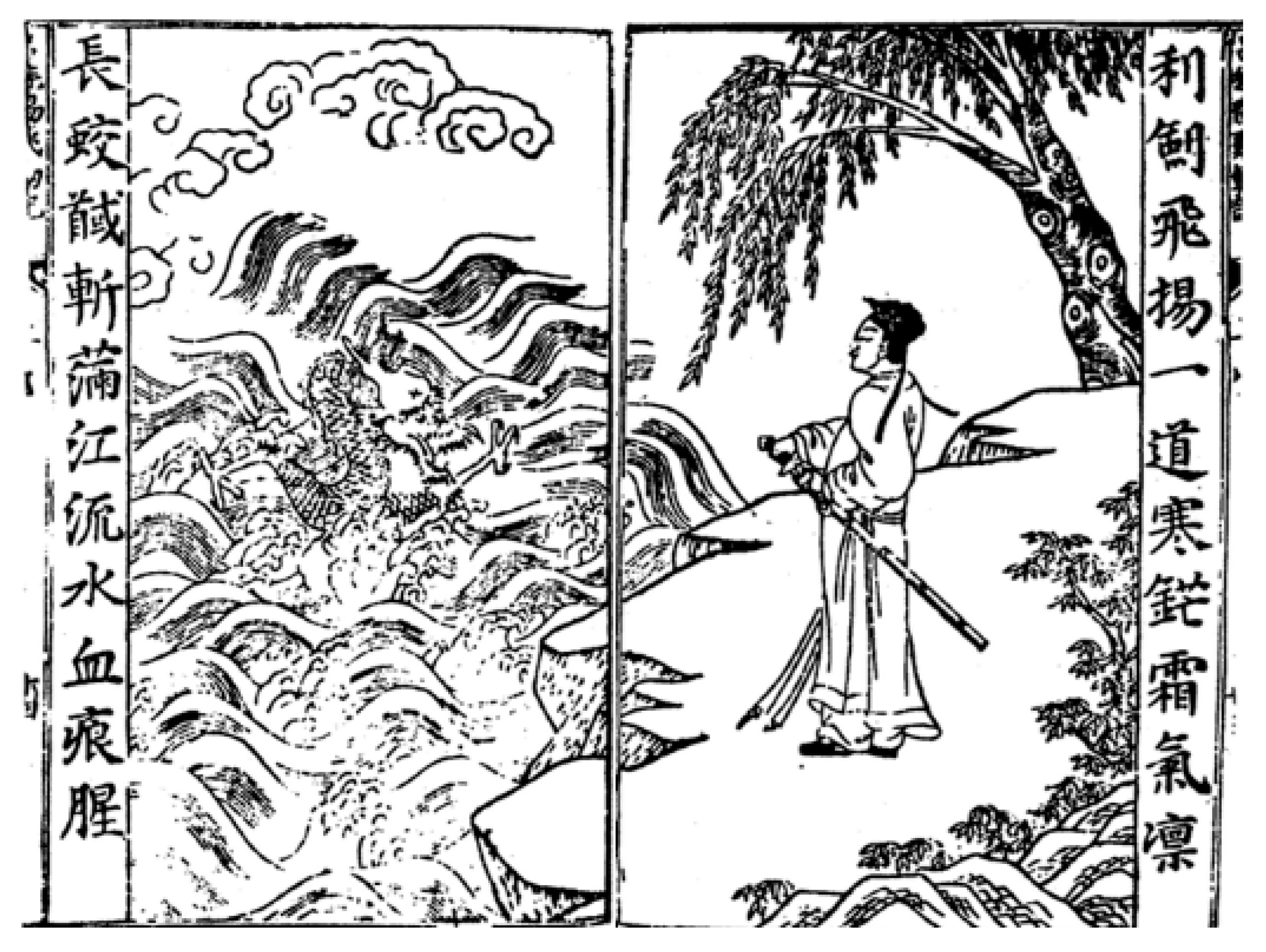
Lü Dongbin confronting a jiaolong-dragon, from Deng Zhimo's The Flying Sword (飛劍記)

As aforementioned, jiao is fully capable of devouring humans, according to Guo Pu's commentary.

It is also written that a green jiao which was a man-eater dwelt in the stream beneath the bridge in Yixing County (present-day city of Yixing, Jiangsu) according to a story in Zu Taizhi (祖臺之; fl. c. 376–410)'s anthology, Zhiguai. The war-general Zhou Chu (周處; 236–297) in his youth, who was native to this area, anecdotally slew this dragon: when Zhou spotted the man-eating beast he leaped down from the bridge and stabbed it several times; the stream was filled with blood and the beast finally washed up somewhere in Lake Tai where it finally died. This anecdote is also recounted in the Shishuo Xinyu (c. 430; "A New Account of Tales of the World") and selected in the Tang period primer Mengqiu.

Other early texts also mention the hunt or capture of the jiao. Emperor Wu of Han in Yuanfeng 5 or 106 BCE reportedly shot a jiao in the river. The Shiyiji 拾遺記 (4th century CE) has a jiao story about Emperor Zhao of Han (r. 87-74 BCE). While fishing in the Wei River, he

...caught a white kiao, three chang [ten meters] long, which resembled a big snake, but had no scaly armour The Emperor said: 'This is not a lucky omen', and ordered the Ta kwan (Note: 大官 daguan, an important official.) to make a condiment of it. Its flesh was purple, its bones were blue, and its taste was very savoury and pleasant.

Three classical texts (Liji 6, Huainanzi 5, and Lüshi Chunqiu 6) repeat a sentence about capturing water creatures at the end of summer; 伐蛟取鼉登龜取黿 "attack the jiao 蛟, take the to 鼉 "alligator", present the gui 龜 "tortoise", and take the yuan 黿 "soft-shell turtle"."

=== Dragon boat festival ===
There is a legend surrounding the Dragon Boat Festival which purports to be the origin behind the offering of zongzi (leaf-wrapped rice cakes) to the drowned nobleman Qu Yuan during its observation. It is said that at the beginning of the Eastern Han dynasty (25 A. D.), a man from Changsha named Ou Hui had a vision in a dream of Qu Yuan instructing him that the naked rice cakes being offered for him in the river are all being eaten by the dragons (jiaolong), and the cakes need to be wrapped in chinaberry (Melia; Chinese: 楝; pinyin: liàn) leaves and tied with color strings, which are two things the dragons abhor. (Note: The source of this is the 6th-century work by Wu Jun (Chinese: 呉均; Wade–Giles: Wu chün) entitled Xu Qixieji (Chinese: 『續齊諧記』; Wade–Giles: Hsü-ch'ih-hsieh-chih). In several redactions such as found in the Taiping Yulan the man's name appears as Ou Hui (歐回); in other redactions, the man is called Ou Qu (歐曲).)

=== Southern origins ===
It has been suggested that the jiao is not a creature of Sinitic origin, but something introduced from the Far South or Yue culture, which encompasses the people of the ancient Yue 越 state), as well as the Hundred Yue people.

Eberhard concludes (1968:378-9) that the jiao, which "occur in the whole of Central and South China", "is a special form of the snake as river god. The snake as river god or god of the ocean is typical for the coastal culture, particularly the sub-group of the Tan peoples (the Tanka people)". Schafer also suggests, "The Chinese lore about these southern krakens seems to have been borrowed from the indigenes of the monsoon coast".

The onomastics surrounding the Long Biên District (now in Hanoi, Vietnam) is that it was so-named from a jialong "flood dragon" seen coiled in the river (Shui jing zhu or the Commentary on the Water Classic 37).

It is recorded that in southern China, there had been the custom of wearing tattoos to ward against the jiaolong. The people in Kuaiji (old capital of Yue; present-day Shaoxing City) adopted such a custom during the Xia dynasty according to the Book of Wei (3rd c.). (Note: "After Shao Kang, king of Xia made his son prince of Kuaiji, the people there adopted the custom of cutting their hair and tattooing their bodies to avert harm from the jialong 夏後少康之子封於會稽，斷髮文身以避蛟龍之害". Gulik renders as "evil dragons"; Teng as "sea monsters".) (Note: More specifically, the portion in Book of Wei describing the Wa (the Japanese). It follows by commenting on a similar tattooing custom among the Wa.) The Yue created this "apotropaic device" by incising their flesh and tattooing it with red and green pigments. (Note: Kong Yingda (6th c.), Lizi Zhengyi 禮記正義 12.15b or 16b apud Reed 2000a, p. 7; Reed 2000b, p. 362.)

== Identification as real fauna ==
The jiao seems to refer to "crocodiles", at least in later literature of the Tang and Song dynasties, and may have referred to "crocodiles" in early literature as well.

Aside from this zoological identification, paleontological identifications have also been attempted.

=== Crocodile or alligator ===
The term jiao e or "jiao crocodile" (蛟鱷; Tang period pronunciation: kău ngak) (Note: Cf. Late Middle Chinese:kaɨw ŋak.) occurs in the description of Han Yu's encounter with crocodiles according to Zhang Du's Xuanshi zhi or "Records of the House of Proclamation" written in the late Tang period. (Note: Albeit the creatures are referred to merely as "crocodile" or "crocodile fish" in Han Yu's own work, the E yu wen (鰐魚文) "Message to Crocodiles".)

As noted the Compendium of Materia Medica identifies jiao with Sanskrit 宮毗羅, (Note: 宮毗羅 is equivalent to 宮毘羅 when you swap out one character into a variant form.) i.e., kumbhīra which denotes a long-snouted crocodylid. The 19th-century herpetologist Albert-Auguste Fauvel concurred, stating that jiaolong referred to a crocodile or gavial clade of animals.

The Compendium also differentiates between jiaolong 蛟龍 and tuolong 鼉龍, Fauvel adding that tuolong (鼉; t'o^{2}) should be distinguished as "alligator". (Note: As does Read tr. 1934, p. 300, tabulated glossary.)

=== Fossil creatures ===
Fauvel noted that the jiao resembled the dinosaur genus Iguanodon, (Note: Although the conception of iguanodon as appearing crocodile-like is outdated.) adding that fossil teeth were being peddled by Chinese medicine shops at the time(1879:8). (Note: Cf. Read tr. 1934, p. 301 noting the similarity of the Sanskrit name to gonglong Wade–Giles: kung-lung for Naosaurus listed in ZN,Bulletin of Zoological Nomenclature.)

=== Sharks and rays ===
In the foregoing example of the huijiao in the "Classic of the Southern Mountains" III, the 19th-century sinologist treated this a type of dragon, the "tiger kiao", while a modern translator as "tiger-crocodile". However, there is also an 18–19th-century opinion that this might have been a shark. A Qing dynasty period commentator, Hao Yixing suggested that huijiao should be identified as jiaocuo 蛟錯 (Note: 鮫䱜 In later printed editions of Bowuzhi) described in the Bowuzhi 博物志, and this jiaocuo in turn is considered to be a type of shark. (Note: Cf. Guo Pu glosses jiao 鮫 as a type of cuo 䱜.)

As in the above example jiao 蛟 may be substituted for jiao 鮫 "shark" in some contexts.

The jiao 鮫 denotes larger sharks and rays, the character for sharks (and rays) in general being sha 鯊, so-named ostensibly due to their skin being gritty and sand-like (Note: Chinese letter for sand is sha 沙; 砂. A description that is often repeated about the shark is that its skin has a pearl-like texture or pattern, and that the skin (shagreen) is used to decorate swords.) (Note: Thus Joseph Needham construes as "patterned with pearls" regarding shark skin for a similar example in the Jiaozhou ji (Chinese: 交州記; Wade–Giles: Chia-chou Chi). However the presence of "pearls in the skin", literally, might have been actually meant since there was a belief since the Song Period that pearls were produced from shark skin.) Compare the supposed quote from the Baopuzi, where it is stated that the jialong is said to have "pearls in the skin" 皮有珠.

Schafer quotes a Song dynasty description, "The kău (jiao) fish has the aspect of a round fan. Its mouth is square and is in its belly. There is a sting in its tail which is very poisonous and hurtful to men. Its skin can be made into sword grips", which may refer to a sting ray.

== Derivative names ==
=== Usage ===
Jiaolong occurs in Chinese toponyms. For example, the highest waterfall in Taiwan is Jiaolong Dapu (蛟龍大瀑), "Flood Dragon Great Waterfall" in the Alishan National Scenic Area.

The deep-sea submersible built and tested in 2010 by the China Ship Scientific Research Center is named Jiaolong (Broad 2010:A1).

The 7th Marine Brigade of the People's Liberation Army Navy Marine Corps is often known as the "Jiaolong Commandos".

The 2025 film Operation Hadal takes its Chinese name (simplified Chinese: 蛟龙行动; traditional Chinese: 蛟龍行動; pinyin: Jiāolóng Xíngdòng; lit. 'Operation Jiaolong') from this creature.

== See also ==
- Jiaolong (album), an album by DJ Daphni (musician)
- Mizuchi, Japanese dragon whose name is sometimes represented using the same Chinese character
