= Thorbjarnarson =

Thorbjarnarson or Þorbjarnarson is a surname of Icelandic origin. In Icelandic names, the name is not strictly a surname, but a patronymic. Notable people with the surname include:

- John Thorbjarnarson (1957–2010), Icelandic crocodilia conservationist
- Þórir Þorbjarnarson (Thorir Thorbjarnarson; born 1998), Icelandic basketball player
