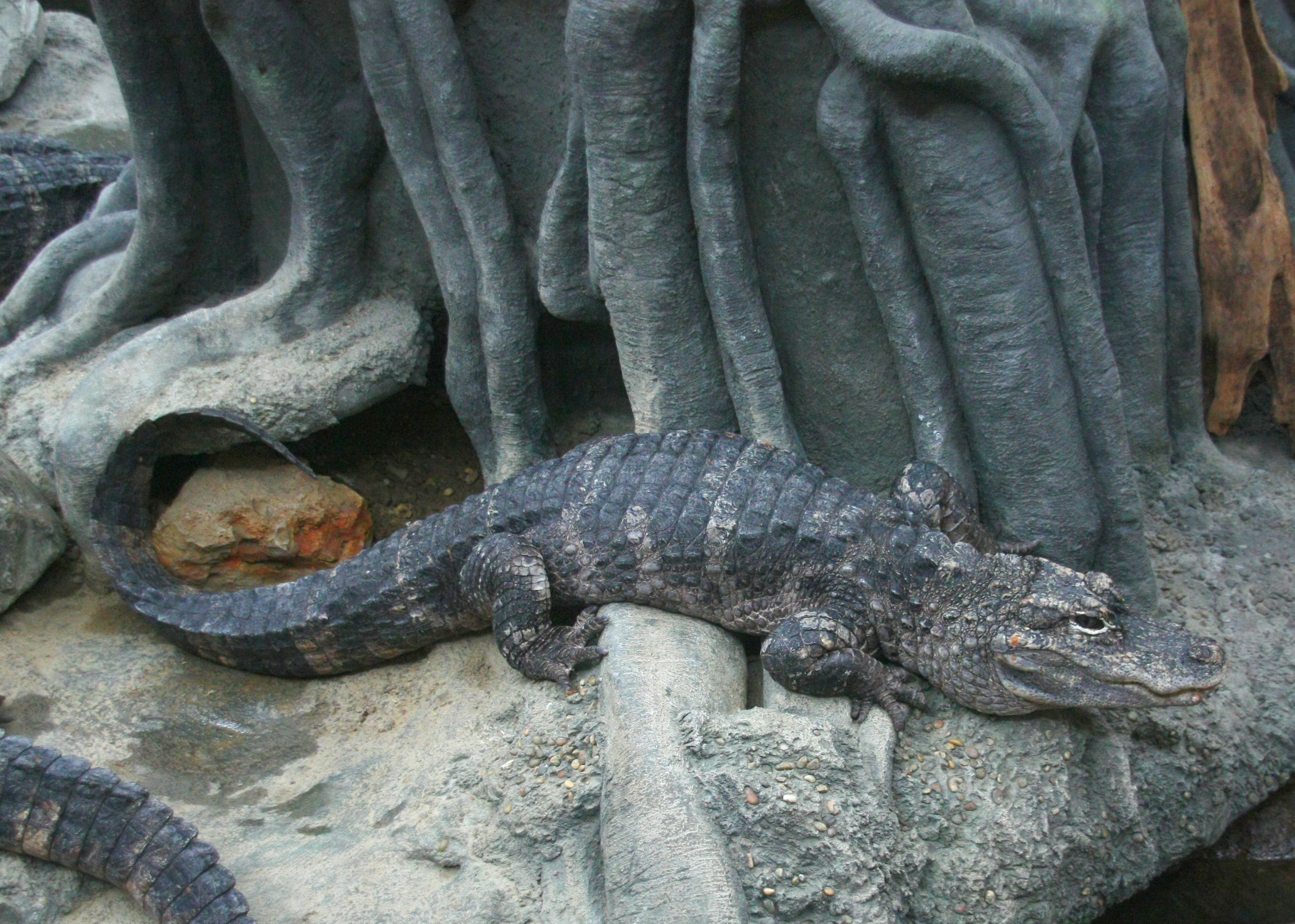
- At the Cincinnati Zoo

Conservation status
- Critically Endangered (IUCN 3.1)
- CITES Appendix I

Scientific classification
- Kingdom: Animalia
- Phylum: Chordata
- Class: Reptilia
- Order: Crocodylia
- Family: Alligatoridae
- Subfamily: Alligatorinae
- Genus: Alligator
- Species: A. sinensis

Binomial name
- Alligator sinensis (Fauvel, 1879)
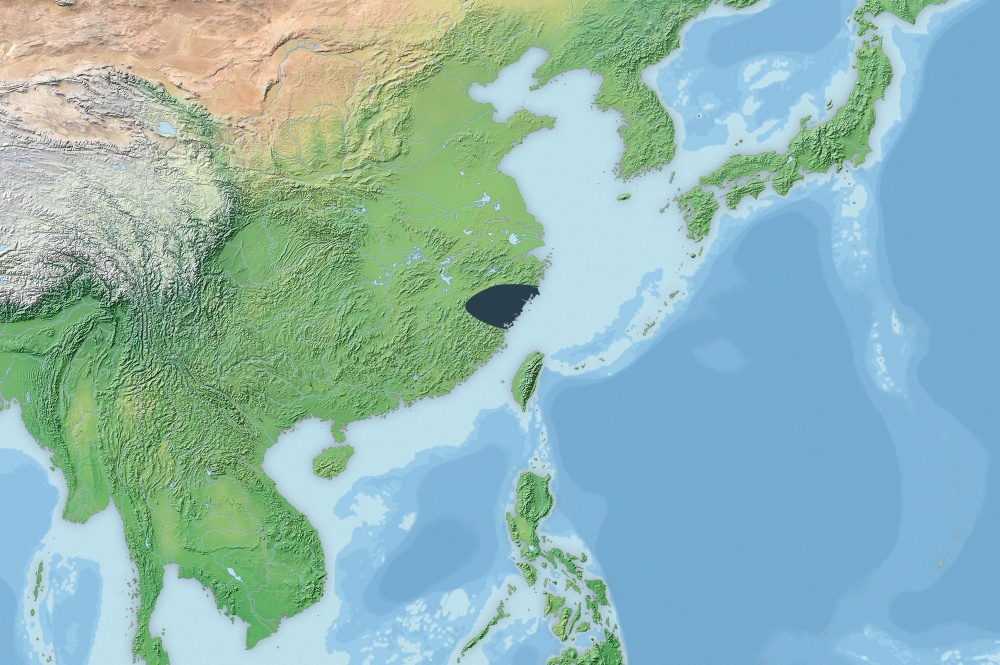
- Chinese alligator range (in Black)

Synonyms
- Caigator sinensis Deraniyagala, 1947

= Chinese alligator =

Chinese alligator Temporal range: Pliocene–Recent, 3.6–0 Ma

Species of reptile

The Chinese alligator (Alligator sinensis; simplified Chinese: 鼍; traditional Chinese: 鼉; pinyin: tuó), also known as the Yangtze alligator (simplified Chinese: 扬子鳄; traditional Chinese: 揚子鱷; pinyin: yángzǐ'è), China alligator, or historically the muddy dragon, is a crocodilian endemic to China. It and the American alligator (A. mississippiensis) are the only living species in the genus Alligator of the family Alligatoridae. Dark gray or black in color with a fully armored body, the Chinese alligator grows to 1.5–2.1 metres (5–7 ft) in length and weighs 36–45 kilograms (80–100 lb) as an adult. It brumates in burrows in winter and is nocturnal in summer. Mating occurs in early summer, with females most commonly producing 20–30 eggs, which are smaller than those of any other crocodilian. The species is an opportunistic feeder, primarily eating fish and invertebrates. A vocal species, adults bellow during the mating season and young vocalize to communicate with their parents and other juveniles. Captive specimens have reached age 70, and wild specimens can live past 50.

Living in bodies of fresh water, the Chinese alligator's range is restricted to six regions in the province of Anhui, as well as possibly the provinces of Jiangsu and Zhejiang. Originally living as far away from its current range as Japan, the species previously had a wide range and population, but beginning in 6000 BC, multiple threats, such as habitat destruction, caused the species' population and range to decline. The population in the wild was about 1,000 in the 1970s, decreased to below 130 in 2001, and grew after 2003, with its population being about 300 as of 2017. Listed as critically endangered by the International Union for Conservation of Nature, multiple conservation actions have been taking place for this species.

The Chinese alligator has been a part of Chinese literature since the third century. In the late 13th century, Marco Polo became the first person outside of China to write about it. In some writings, the Chinese alligator has been associated with the Chinese dragon.

== History and taxonomy ==
The oldest definitive record of the Chinese alligator is from the late Pliocene of Japan, around 3 million years old. Pleistocene fossils show that its range was once much more extensive, extending northwards to Shandong and southwards to the Taiwan Strait.

Chinese alligators were mentioned in Chinese literature very early; for example, in the Classic of Poetry, whose poems were composed between the 11th and 7th centuries BCE. Marco Polo was the first person outside of China to write about the alligator, when he came to China and saw it in the late 1200s. He said that the alligator lived in "caverns" in the day and hunted at night, and that humans targeted its meat and skin, with its gall bladder having multiple medical purposes. He stated that it was found in lakes, rivers, and springs in the province "Karazan". In 1656, Martino Martini, a priest, wrote that the Chinese alligator lived in the river Yangtze and was "much feared by the local residents". Unlike Polo, Martini wrote his description using information from Chinese literature. Chinese alligators were later thought to give Buddhist priests merit if the priests were to buy alligators held in captivity and release them. In 1869, Robert Swinhoe saw a Chinese alligator in an exhibit in Shanghai and wrote the following year:

In February, 1869, some Chinese were exhibiting in the native city of Shanghai what they called a dragon, which they declared had been dug out of a hole in the province of Shense. It was a young crocodile about four feet long, which they kept in tepid water. They made so much money by showing it that they refused to sell it. I can not, of course, guess its species; but I nevertheless think the fact worth recording, as evidence that a species of this group does occur in China.

=== Classification ===
The Chinese alligator was scientifically described by French naturalist Albert-Auguste Fauvel in 1879 as Alligator sinensis; though Fauvel only noticed mentions of them in Chinese literature since about 222–227 CE. The genus Alligator had previously contained only the American alligator since its creation in 1807. Fauvel wrote a detailed description of the species in a book titled Alligators in China: Their History, Description & Identification, including information about its historical account. In 1947, it was suggested to group the Chinese alligator in a separate genus from its American relative, due to the Chinese alligator's bony plate on its upper eyelid. This bony plate is present in caimans, but is rarely present in the American alligator. At the time, the plate was thought to not appear in the American alligator at all. This produced the belief that the Chinese alligator's relationship with other crocodilians was between caimans and American alligators. Paulus Edward Pieris Deraniyagala described the genus Caigator the same year, which only contained the Chinese alligator, making its scientific name Caigator sinensis. However, paleontology has shown that the Chinese alligator has evolved from other now-extinct members of the genus Alligator. This and the fact that the American alligator does infrequently have a bony plate on its eyelid have caused Caigator sinensis to now be classified as a synonym of Alligator sinensis. There is still not a consensus among biologists that the American and Chinese alligators belong to the same genus, despite multiple studies comparing the biochemistry, histology, and various other aspects of the two crocodilians.

The evolutionary relationships of alligators can be shown in the cladogram below:

- Alligatoridae
  - Caimaninae
  - Alligatorinae
    - Ceratosuchus burdoshi†
    - Hassiacosuchus haupti†
    - Navajosuchus mooki†
    - - Wannaganosuchus brachymanus†
      - Arambourgia gaudryi†
      - - Allognathosuchus polyodon†
        - Allognathosuchus wartheni†
        - Procaimanoidea kayi†
      - Alligator
        - Alligator prenasalis†
        - - Alligator mcgrewi†
          - - Alligator olseni†
            - - Alligator sinensis Chinese alligator
              - - Alligator thomsoni†
                - Alligator mefferdi†
                - Alligator mississippiensis American alligator

=== Etymology ===
The genus name, Alligator, is based on the English word alligator, ultimately from Spanish el lagarto 'the lizard'. The specific name, sinensis, is from the Neo-Latin adjective sinensis 'belonging to China, Chinese'.

== Description ==
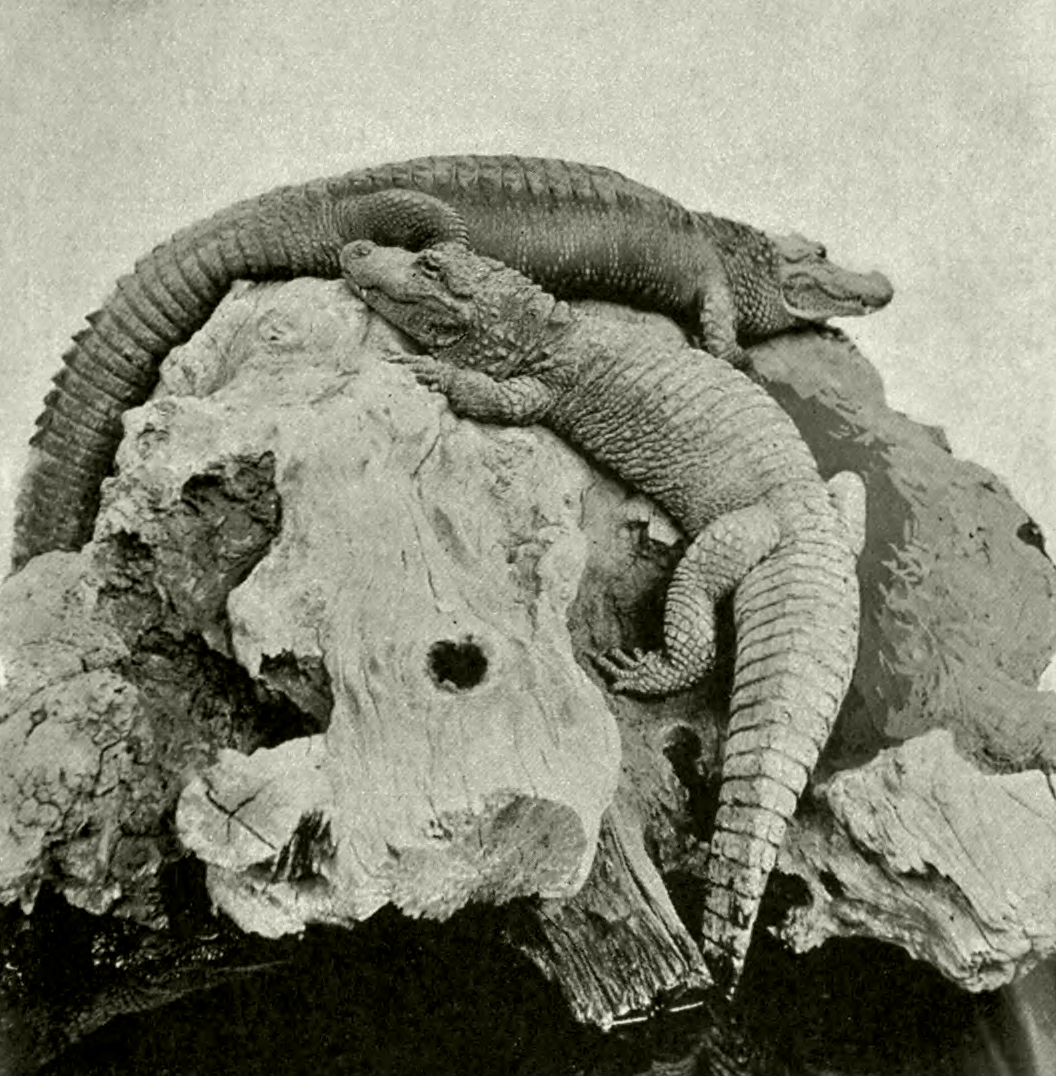
Comparison of the American alligator (top) and the Chinese alligator (bottom)

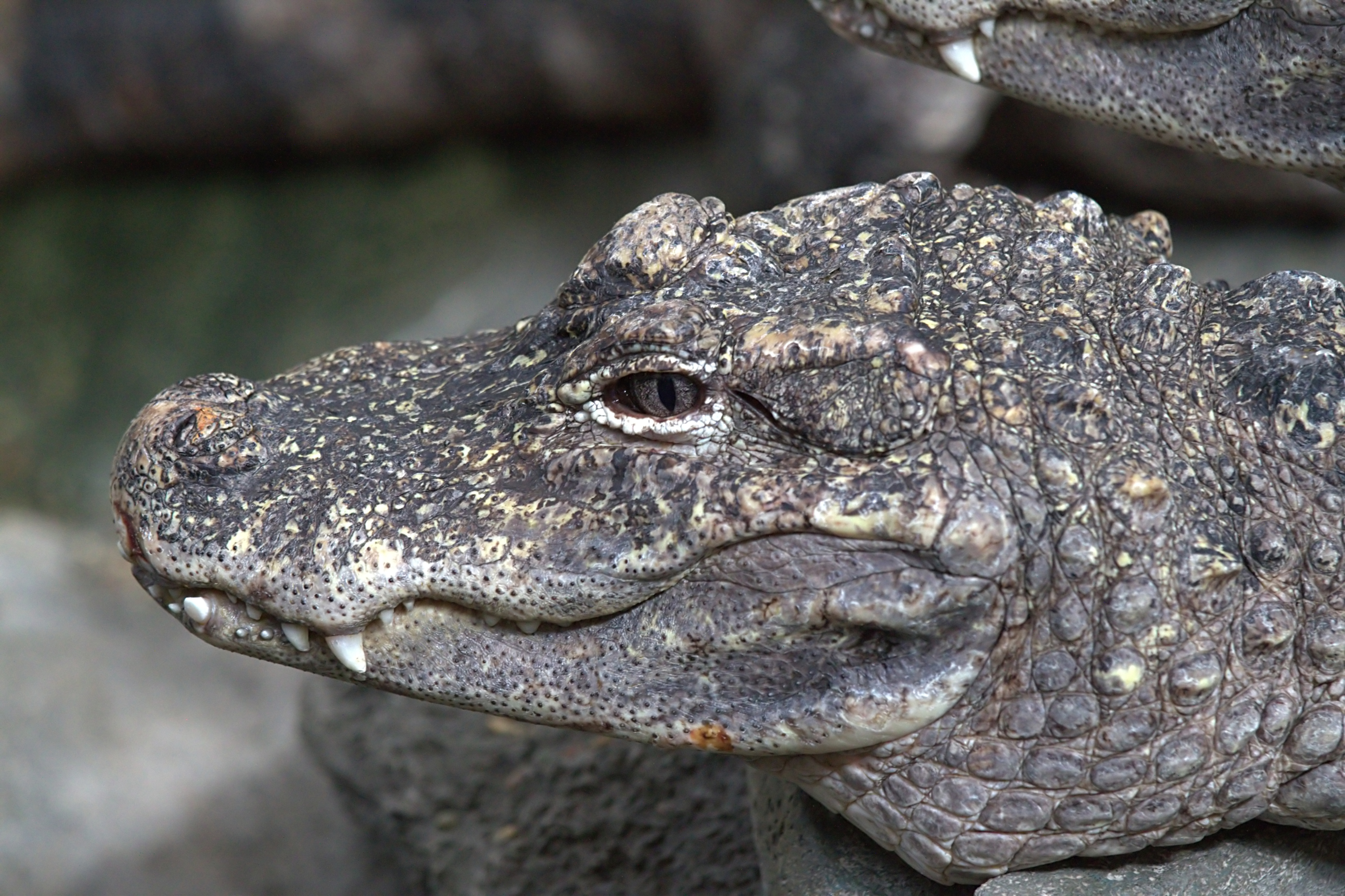
Detail of head

One of the smallest species of crocodilians, the Chinese alligator attains a length of 1.5–2.1 metres (5–7 ft) and weight of 36–45 kilograms (80–100 lb) as an adult. Females are roughly three-quarters the length of males. It is less than half the size of the American alligator, which typically grows to a length of 3.4 metres (11.2 ft) for males and 2.5 metres (8.2 ft) for females. Reports are known of alligators in China reaching 3 metres (10 ft) in past centuries, but these are no longer thought to be accurate. The largest reported female measured 2.07 metres (6 ft 9 in) and weighed 50 kilograms (110 lb), while the largest reported male measured 2.46 metres (8 ft 1 in) and weighed 84 kilograms (185 lb).

The Chinese alligator is almost completely black or dark gray in color as an adult. It has a short and broad snout, which points slightly upwards and narrows at the end. Its head is robust, more so than that of the American alligator, with a bony septum dividing its nostrils. It has 72–76 teeth, of which 13–14 are maxillary, five premaxillary, and 18–19 mandibular. Four specimens measuring 1.4 to 1.55 m (4 ft 7 in – 5 ft 1 in) in length and weighing 12–15 kg (26–33 lb) had a bite force of 894–1,357 N (201–305 lb_{f}). Unlike the American alligator, the Chinese alligator is fully armored, including its belly. It contains up to 17 rows of scales across its body, which are soft on its belly and side and rougher on its back. Its upper eyelids have bony plates on them, a feature usually not present in the American alligator. Its tail is wider than that of the American alligator. It does not have webbed feet, in contrast to the American alligator, which has extensive webbing on its toes.

== Ecology ==
The Chinese alligator brumates (Note: A form of dormancy similar to hibernation that is exhibited by reptiles) in burrows during winter. After this period of dormancy, it frequently spends time in the sun before summer begins. It is nocturnal throughout summer, feeding at night and sheltering in the daytime, to avoid both humans and the summer heat. This behavior gives it the ability to live in areas where humans are common. A docile species, it generally does not intentionally hurt humans.

=== Burrowing ===
This alligator brumates from late October to mid-April, emerging in early May. It constructs its burrows next to ponds and other small bodies of water, using its head and front legs to dig into the ground. They can be large and complex, containing multiple rooms, water pools, and entrances. Most of them are 10–25 metres (33–82 ft) long, with each room having enough space for alligators to turn around after entering. Outside of winter, the burrows serve as retreat sites for the alligators and in summer are where they take shelter in the daytime. The temperature inside them is never colder than 10 °C (50 °F). The burrows can be problematic for farmers, as they cause destruction of farm dykes.

=== Life cycle ===
The breeding season of the Chinese alligator is early summer, with the rate of mating being highest in mid-June. The alligator breeds earlier in the year if temperatures are higher. During the time of mating, males commonly search around ponds to find a mate and both male and female specimens are often aggressive to each other. The species exhibits polygamy, with single males mating with multiple females and/or a single female mating with several males. A study of 50 clutches showed multiple paternity in 60% of them, with up to three males contributing. Nests are typically built about 2–3 weeks after mating, from July to late August. Constructed by the females, they are composed of rotting plants, such as leaves, and are 40–70 centimetres (16–28 in) high. Females prefer to assemble them in areas that have a thick canopy and are far from human disturbance. Because islands frequently satisfy both of these conditions, they are often used as nesting sites. Nests are always near water sources. Individuals often return to the same nesting site yearly, although intraspecific competition and environmental changes can force them to change nesting sites.

Generally laid at night, mating typically produces 20–30 eggs, although according to the International Union for Conservation of Nature (IUCN), clutch size ranges between 10 and 40 eggs. After the eggs are laid, the females sometimes leave the nest, but other times stay to protect the eggs. The eggs are about 6 centimetres (2.4 in) in length, 3.5 centimetres (1.38 in) in diameter, and 45 grams (1.59 oz) in weight, making them smaller than the eggs of any other crocodilian. They are typically incubated for about 70 days. On average, the temperature of incubation is 25–26 °C (77–79 °F), including the day and night. This temperature controls whether a young alligator will be male or female (temperature-dependent sex determination), a feature present in many other reptiles. A higher incubation temperature also increases the hatching rate. Young hatch in September, assisted by their mothers.

Newborn alligators, like their eggs, are the smallest of any crocodilian, with a length of 20–22 centimetres (7.87–8.66 in) and weight of 25–30 grams (0.88–1.06 oz). Unlike adults, they have light speckles on their bodies and heads. Mothers help them leave the nest and bring them to the water after hatching. They grow very little in their first year, due to being able to feed for only about 2 months after hatching before the winter. A 2002 study showed that the Chinese alligator is two-thirds the length of the American alligator and one-half its weight at birth, but is one-half its length and one-tenth its weight after one year. Young depend on their mothers to protect them during their first winter, as their small size makes them an easy prey target.

The alligator grows quickly in its first few years, with its growth rate slowing at age five. According to the National Zoological Park, females reach maturity roughly four to five years after birth, although other sources estimate that they mature at age six to seven. It can live to over 50 years, and has been known to reach age 70 in captivity. It cannot breed past its 50s.

=== Feeding ===
The Chinese alligator is an opportunistic feeder, meaning that it can prey on a variety of different animals depending on what is available. It is a carnivore, mostly eating fish and invertebrates, such as crustaceans, insects, mussels, clams, and snails. When possible, it eats rodents, other small mammals, and aquatic birds as well. It has dull teeth, which allow it to eat prey with shells more easily. There is some speculation that they may prey on turtles as well. A study of the alligator in 1985 showed that snails were the most common animal in its diet at 63%, with 65% of that being river snails and 35% spiral-shelled snails. According to the survey, its diet also contained 16% rabbits, 8.3% mollusks, and 4.1% shrimp, with the remaining 6.8% being frogs, fish, and insects.

=== Vocalization ===
The Chinese alligator is a vocal species, making many different sounds in multiple situations. When communicating with nearby alligators, it produces sounds such as head slapping, hissing, and whining, which have a low sound pressure level (SPL). To communicate long-distance, it produces bellows, which have a high SPL. All of these sounds have a low frequency of less than 500 hertz, due to the alligator's densely vegetated habitat, which allow the sounds to spread across a greater area.

Both sexes participate in bellowing choruses during the mating season as adults. Lasting an average of 10 minutes, the alligators remain still for the entirety of the chorus, with both sexes responding equally in rough unison. The main purpose of these bellows is to call out to alligator specimens to collect at a specific pond, where individuals choose mates and engage in copulation. Alligators may also bellow to publicize their size, a behavior which occurs in multiple other vertebrates. The size of a specimen is a significant factor for mating; females only mate with males larger than themselves. Bellowing is most common at 6:00–7:00 am and 11:00–12:00 am CST. Although these bellows occur most frequently during the mating season, adults also bellow throughout the rest of the year.

Young Chinese alligators often communicate with each other and their parents using vocal signals to "maintain group cohesion". Young also make sounds when in danger, which alert adults to help and caution nearby young of the threat. Embryos produce distinctive sounds inside their eggs, which alert the adult female that the nest is ready to be opened. These vocalizations are high-pitched, while their danger calls are louder.

== Distribution and population ==
The modern range of the Chinese alligator is extremely restricted. Historically, the alligator was widely distributed in the Yangtze river system. By the late 1980s, it was restricted to small ponds in six counties in the southeastern part of Anhui province; and since 2015, the IUCN estimates the area of occupation at about 5 square kilometres (1.9 mi^{2}). It is the only species in the family Alligatoridae that lives in the Eastern Hemisphere.

=== Habitat ===
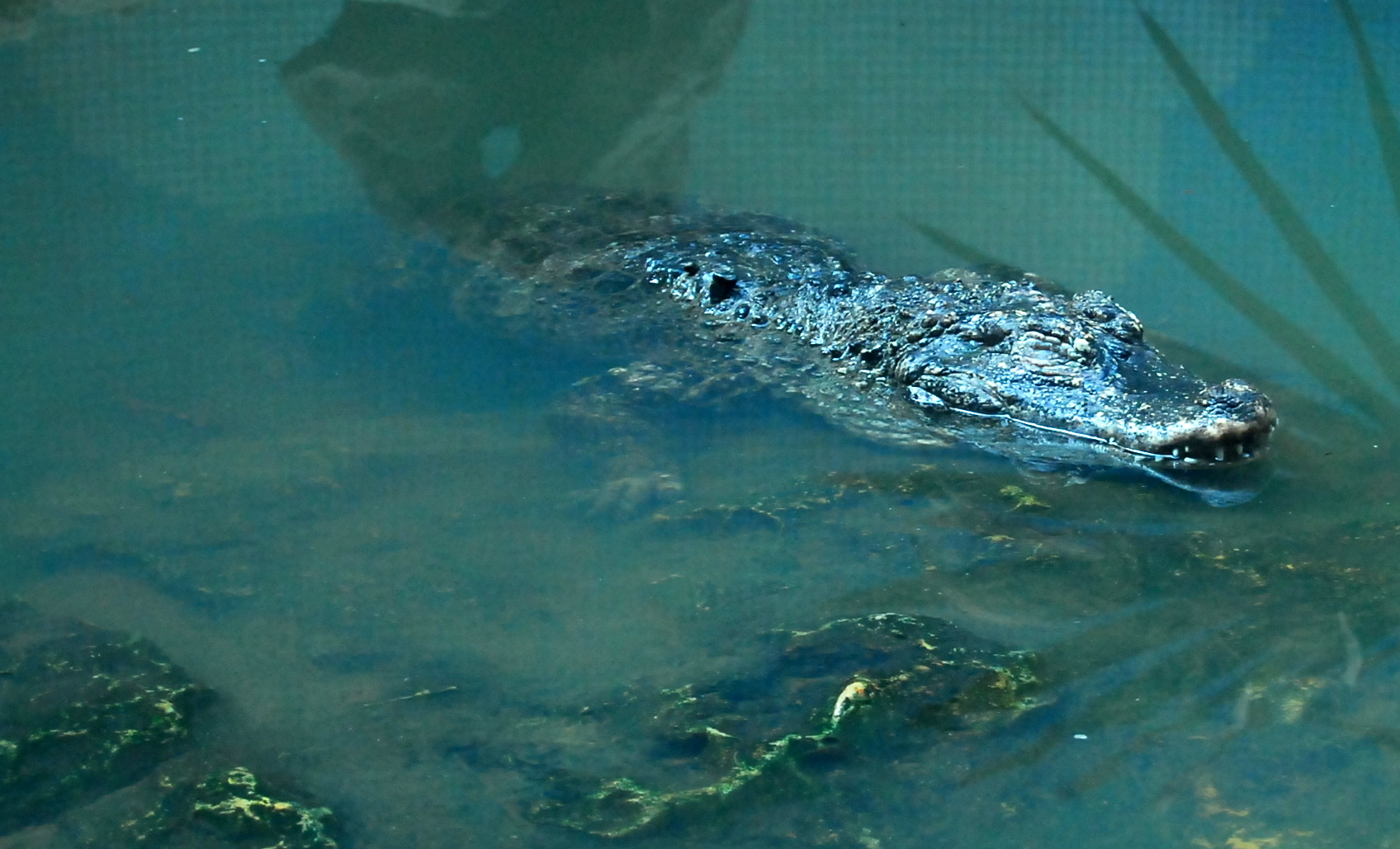
The habitat of the Chinese alligator is fresh water bodies, as pictured.

The habitat of the Chinese alligator is bodies of fresh water, particularly wetlands and ponds, in areas transitioning between subtropical and temperate climates. It lives at the base of mountains, in areas where grass and shrubs are common. Habitat loss has also forced it to live at higher elevations than it prefers, where the weather is colder and the soil is unfit for burrow digging. Crocodilian conservationist John Thorbjarnarson observed a female who had to build her nest of pine needles rather than the usual plants; the eggs died due to the pine needles not being able to warm them properly.

=== Population and range trend ===
The oldest record of the Chinese alligator is a skeleton fragment found in western Japan. The fossil is estimated to be from the late Pliocene period, 3 million years ago (Mya). The skeleton showed that the species was larger at the time than it is currently, with a total length of at least 2 metres (6.6 ft). Alligators are believed to have moved into various parts of Japan either before 25 Mya or after 10 Mya and were extirpated from there during the Plio-Pleistocene period, due to Japan's increased isolation from the continent and harsh climate conditions.

The population of the Chinese alligator began to decline in 5000 BC, when human civilization started to grow in China, after having been very abundant in the lower Yangtze area. This area was one of the first places in the world to farm rice, causing much of the alligator's habitat to be destroyed in favor of rice farms. In the 1700s, much of the Chinese alligator's habitat was replaced with farming fields after a large number of people had moved into the area. By the 20th century, its range was reduced to a few small areas around the Yangtze. In the 1950s, the alligator was in three distinct areas: the southern area of the Yangtze (Chang Jiang) from Pengze to the western shore of Lake Tai (Tai Hu), the mountainous regions of southern Anhui, and the provinces of Jiangsu and Zhejiang, primarily in lakes, streams, and marshes. By the 1970s, it was restricted to small parts of southern Anhui and Zhejiang, at which time the population was about 1,000.

In 1998, the population of the Chinese alligator was the lowest it had ever been; the largest area it lived in was a small pond along the Yangtze surrounded by farmland, which held 11 alligators. In 1999, the Wildlife Conservation Society estimated that 130–150 individuals were left in the wild. According to The New York Times, the population was less than 130 in 2001; at this time, alligators sometimes wandered around to look for a suitable habitat, but were unsuccessful due to their habitat having been turned into rice fields. In 2003, the population began to gradually increase after having been roughly stable between 1998 and 2003. A survey of the population by the Anhui National Nature Reserve for Chinese Alligator (ANNRCA) in 2005 deduced that between 92 and 114 adults and 66 young remained in the wild. The survey reasoned that the species' population was growing in four sites, but stable in the rest of the alligator's range. A 2012 journal article estimated the population at the time to be 120–150. A 2015 survey observed 64 individuals, of which 32 were adults, estimating that the total number of adults was 68–86 and the total population 136–173. Wang Renping, the head of the ANNRCA, stated in 2017 that about 300 specimens existed in the wild, some of which had been born captive and reintroduced to the wild. As of 2018 the population is not considered to be further declining. Due to the low wild population of the Chinese alligator, high inbreeding is a major concern threatening their chances for long-term survival.

=== Reasons for population decline ===
Considered to be one of the most endangered crocodilians in the world, the Chinese alligator's biggest threats in the late 20th century were human killing and habitat loss. A majority of the species' wetland habitats were destroyed to construct rice paddies and dams. During the 1970s and 1980s, humans sometimes killed the alligators, because they believed they were pests, out of fear, or for their meat. Their meat was thought to have the ability to cure colds and prevent cancer and their organs were sold for medicinal purposes. In several restaurants and food centers in China's more prosperous areas, young alligators were allowed to roam free with their mouths taped shut, and were subsequently killed for human consumption, served as a dish of rice, vegetables, and chopped up alligator flesh. In the late 20th century, people living in the range of the Chinese alligator ate its meat due to believing that it was dragon meat.

The Yangtze was flooded in the winter of 1957, which is believed to have caused many Chinese alligators to drown. Rats, which this species eat, have been poisoned by farmers, so were also a cause for the diminishing of the species. The organochlorine compound sodium pentachlorophenate was used to kill snails in agricultural fields starting in 1958, which incidentally poisoned the alligators as well. Other factors that led to the endangerment of the alligator include natural disasters and geographic separation.

== Status and conservation ==
In its native country, the Chinese alligator has been listed as a Class I endangered species since 1972, which gives it the highest possible degree of legal protection and makes killing or capturing the species in the wild forbidden. It is listed as a CITES Appendix I species and an endangered species by the U.S. Fish & Wildlife Service. Following six assessments as endangered from 1982 to 1994, it is classified as critically endangered on the IUCN Red List as of 2017. In 1982, the Anhui National Nature Reserve for Chinese Alligator (ANNRCA) was created, a reserve spanning across the entire range of the Chinese alligator, now covering an area of 18,565 hectares (45,880 acres).

=== In captivity ===
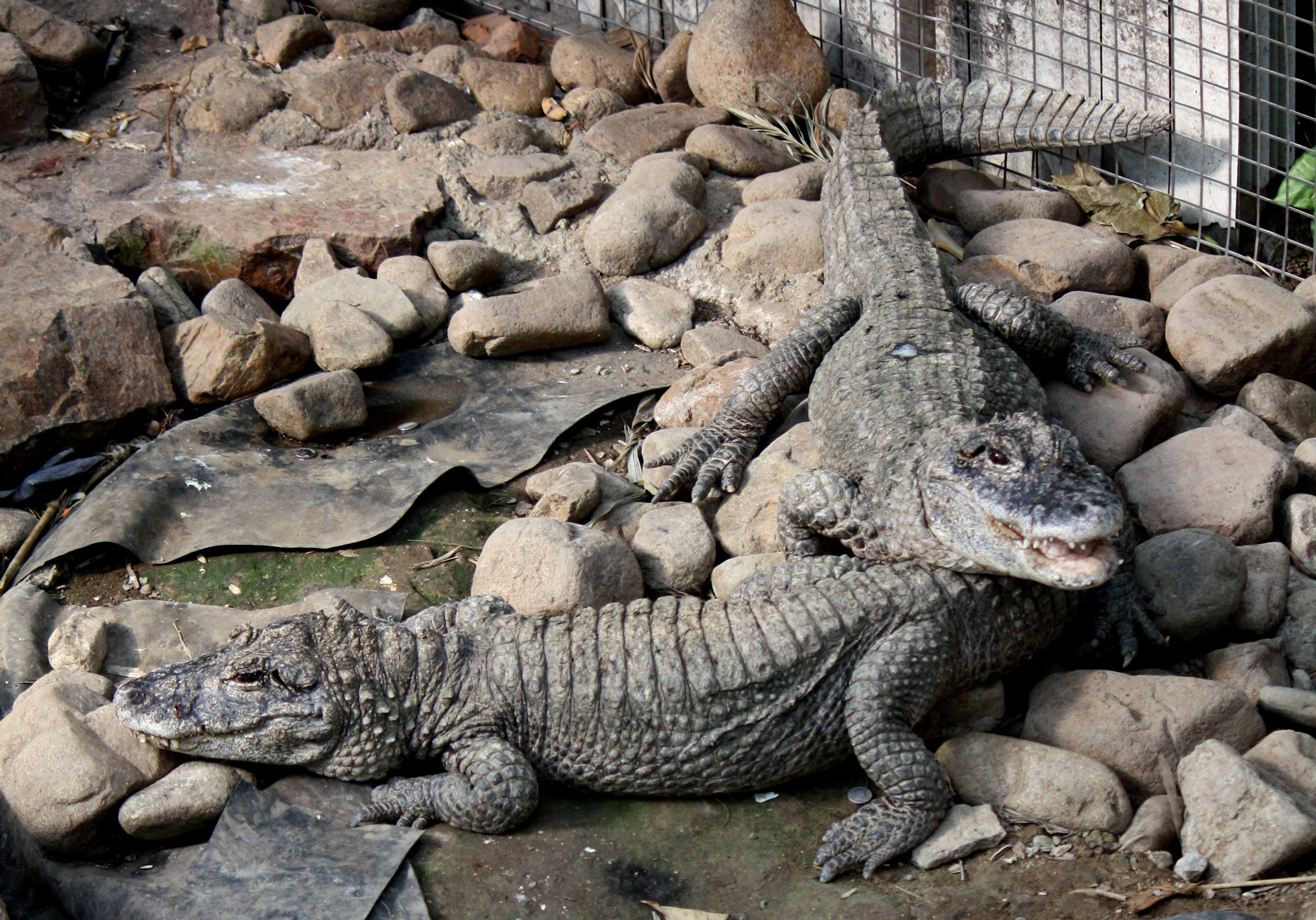
Chinese alligators at Shanghai Zoo

As of 2016, at least 20,000 Chinese alligators (Note: Over 15,000 in the Anhui Research Center for Chinese Alligator Reproduction (ARCCAR) and 5,500 in the Changxing Nature Reserve and Breeding Center for Chinese Alligators (CNRBRCCA), as well as those living in other facilities) are living in captivity due to captive-breeding programs, the first initiated in the 1970s. Captive-born Chinese alligators have been reintroduced into their native range, boosting the wild population. Six specimens were released from captivity in 2007, followed by six more in June 2015. As of June 2016, the largest group of Chinese alligators to have been released in the wild was when 18 specimens were reintroduced to Langxi County, part of the species' native habitat, on May 22, 2016. These releases have proven successful, with individuals adapting well to a life in the wild and breeding. A year after the 2007 release, 16 young alligators were found living in the wild. 60 alligator eggs were observed in 2016, distributed in three nests at a wetland park. Although a typhoon in September the same year flooded and eliminated two of the nests, three hatchlings were found in the same area several days after.

==== China ====
The two largest breeding centers for the Chinese alligator are in, or near, the areas where Chinese alligators are still found in the wild. The Anhui Research Center for Chinese Alligator Reproduction (ARCCAR) is the largest of them, housing roughly 15,000 Chinese alligators as of 2016. The center is 5 kilometres (3.1 mi) from the city of Xuancheng, (Note: 30°54′30″N 118°46′20″E) where it makes use of a series of ponds in a small valley. Founded in 1979, the ARCCAR was stocked with 212 alligators collected from the wild over the first decade after its establishment, and received alligator eggs collected by the area's residents and the ARCCAR's own staff from the nests of wild alligators as well. In 1988, the first eggs by human-bred alligators were laid. The reserve decided to reintroduce some of its alligators in the wild in 2001, which was carried out in 2003 when three alligators were released. The alligator breeding was so successful that the ARCCAR began to use the alligators for local meat consumption and live animals for the European pet market, with the profits from these activities continuing to fund the breeding centers.

The other major breeding center for the species is the Changxing Chinese Alligator Nature Reserve (CCANR) or Changxing Nature Reserve and Breeding Center for Chinese Alligators (CNRBRCCA), in Changxing County, Zhejiang, about 92 kilometres (57 mi) east of the ARCCAR. (Note: 30°55′15″N 119°44′00″E) Originally known as the Yinjiabian Alligator Conservation Area (尹家边扬子鳄保护区), the breeding center was established in 1982. Unlike the ARCCAR, where alligator eggs are collected by the center's staff for incubation in controlled condition, the CCANR allows eggs to hatch naturally. According to a 2013 official report, the CCANR housed almost 4,000 alligators, including 2,089 young (1–3 years old), 1,598 juveniles (4–12 years old), and 248 adults (13+ years old). By 2016, 5,500 specimens were housed at the center.

In 2003, the ARCCAR received a donation of $1.2 million from the State Forestry and Grassland Administration of China (SFGA) and $740,000 from the government of Anhui. This allowed the organization to create two new breeding areas to hold the alligators, 1.6 hectares (4.0 acres) each, as well as heighten the existing fence. The same year, the CCANR received a donation of $600,000 from the SFGA and $800,000 from the government of Changxing, enabling it to reinstate wetlands for the alligators and enhance its facilities. Both the ARCCAR and the CCANR position themselves as tourist attractions, where paying visitors can view alligators and learn about them.

Multiple other breeding facilities that house the Chinese alligator exist in various provinces of China, as well as private breeding farms and museums.

==== Foreign countries ====
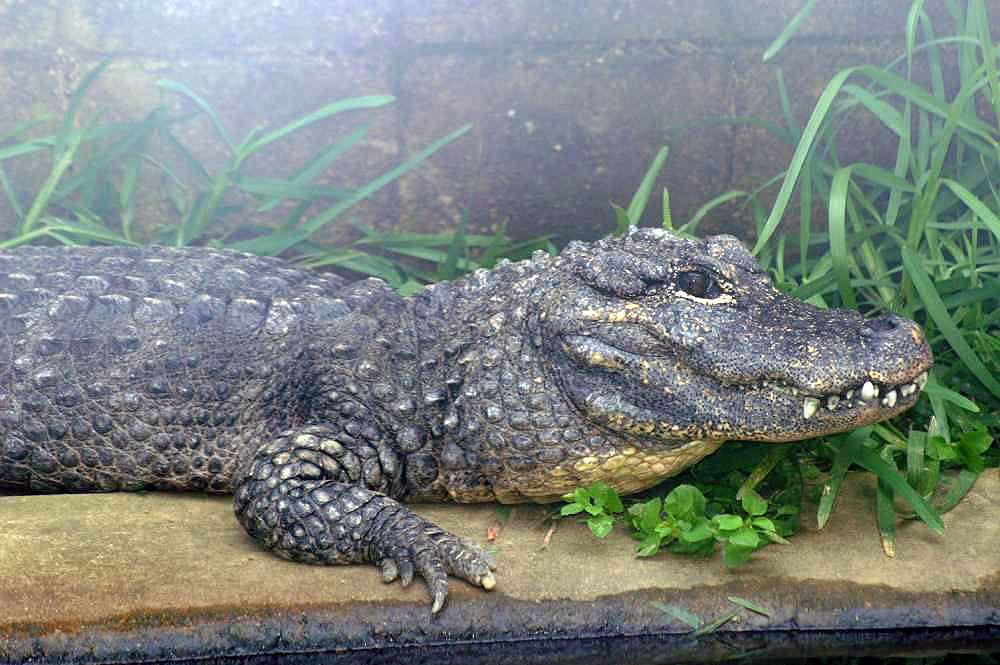
The Chinese alligator in the Smithsonian National Zoological Park

The Chinese alligator is also kept and bred at many zoos and aquariums in North America and Europe. Some individuals bred there have been returned to China for reintroduction to the wild. The first time the alligators were ever transported internationally is believed to have been when several were taken from China to the United States in the 1950s. In November 2017, four Chinese alligators were transported from their natural habitat in China to Shizuoka, Japan.

Among the North American zoos and aquariums keeping this species are the Bronx Zoo, Cincinnati Zoo, Great Plains Zoo, Sedgwick County Zoo, Philadelphia Zoo, San Diego Zoo, Santa Barbara Zoo, St. Augustine Alligator Farm Zoological Park, Smithsonian National Zoological Park, and St. Louis Zoo. In Europe, about 25 zoos and aquariums keep the species, such as the Barcelona Zoo (Spain), Parque de las Ciencias (Granada) (Spain), Bioparco di Roma (Italy), Crocodile Zoo (Denmark), Moscow Zoo (Russia), Pairi Daiza (Belgium), Paradise Wildlife Park (England), Parken Zoo (Sweden), Prague Zoo (Czech Republic), Tallinn Zoo (Estonia) and Tierpark Berlin (Germany).

== Chinese dragon association ==
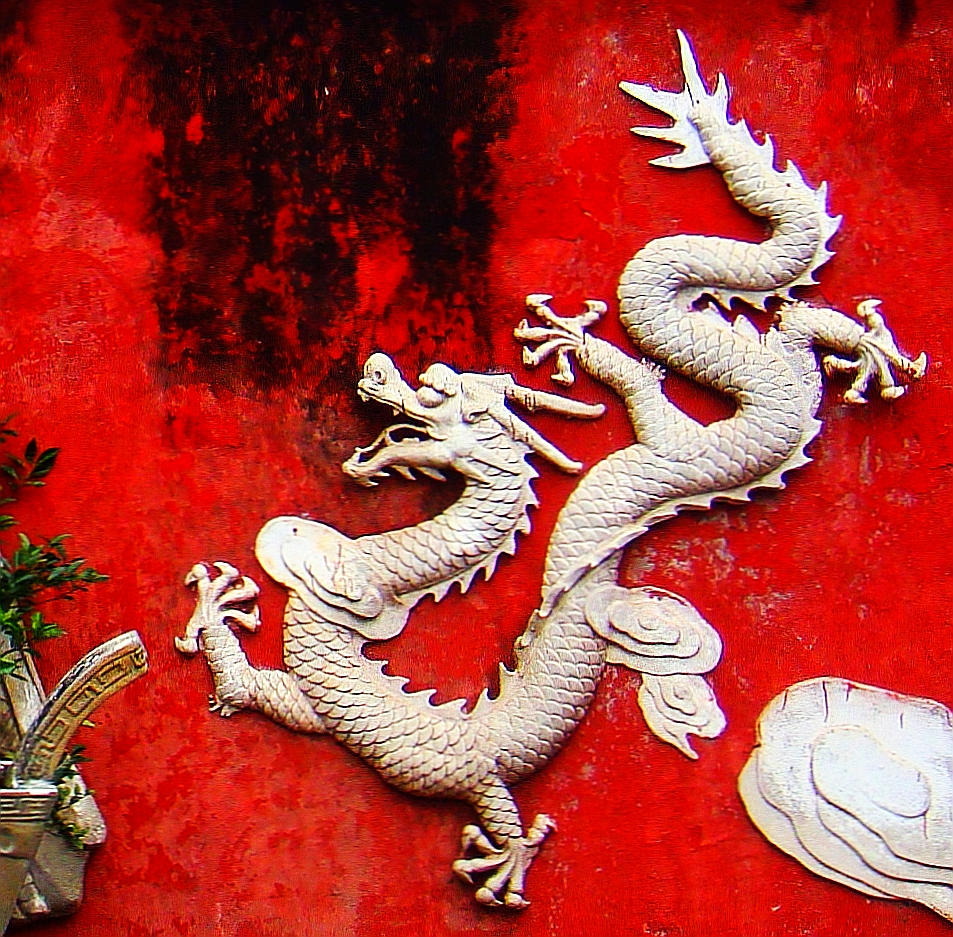
The Chinese dragon in Haikou, Hainan, China

Some writers have suggested that the Chinese alligator was the inspiration for the Chinese dragon. This theory was widespread in the early 1900s, and the idea was later revisited by John Thorbjarnarson and Xiaoming Wang. According to The New York Times, the association with the "beneficent" mythological creature is an advantage for the species.

The Chinese dragon is portrayed as a symbol of "royal power and good fortune", frequently helping and saving people. It is able to swim in water or air. The relatively harmless nature of the Chinese alligator is believed to have been an influence for the helpful nature of the dragon. The fact that the alligator ends its brumation when the rainy season begins and returns to its burrows when the rainwater in rivers recedes, as well as the fact that it lives in bodies of water, may be the reason for the dragon's portrayal as a water-related mythological creature. Alligator drums may have been used to simulate the species' vocalizations during the mating season, which humans associated with the dragon's "power of summoning rainclouds".

== See also ==
- Wildlife of China
- Animal communication
- Caiman
