= Grammata Serica Recensa =

Dictionary of Old Chinese

- Author: Bernard Karlgren
- Language: English
- Publisher: Museum of Far Eastern Antiquities, Stockholm
- Publication date: 1957
- Publication place: Sweden
- Pages: 332
- OCLC: 1999753

The Grammata Serica Recensa is a dictionary of Middle Chinese and Old Chinese published by the Swedish sinologist Bernard Karlgren in 1957.

== History ==
Karlgren made fundamental contributions to the study of the phonology of Middle and Old Chinese, which he called Ancient and Archaic Chinese respectively. In the course of his study of the sound system of Old Chinese, Karlgren focused on clues provided by phono-semantic compound characters. His "homorganic principle", asserting that the initials of characters sharing a phonetic component had a common point of articulation, has been central to subsequent studies of Old Chinese.

In 1923, Karlgren published his Analytic dictionary of Middle Chinese, which grouped characters by phonetic series and drew inferences about Old Chinese sounds. His Grammata Serica (1940) was an expanded dictionary that included Karlgren's Old Chinese reconstructions. An extensive revision incorporating the results of Karlgren's studies of pre-Han texts, the Grammata Serica Recensa, appeared in 1957. It also indicated tones, which had been omitted in the first version.

Although Karlgren's Old Chinese reconstructions have been superseded, his comprehensive dictionary remains a valuable reference for students of Old Chinese. As late as 1998, it was described as "the only good Chinese–English dictionary of Classical Chinese". Supplements to the GSR continue to appear to remedy such defects as the limited indexing and obsolete reconstructions. The Sino-Tibetan Etymological Dictionary and Thesaurus (STEDT) project uses an electronic form of the GSR and has donated a mapping to Unicode, which is now included in the Unicode dataset.

== Organization ==
Each numbered entry lists characters with a common phonetic element. Characters within each entry are labelled by lowercase letters (excluding "w"), supplemented with prime symbols, as required. Some are ancient variant forms. Each distinct character is given, with its pronunciation in Old Chinese, Middle Chinese and Modern Standard Chinese as well as definitions from ancient sources. A sample entry is

964 a. 子 *tsi̯əg / tsi: / tsï son, daughter, child (Shï); treat as a child (Shï); the young of animals (Shï); gentleman (Shï); young lady (Shï); master (Lunyü); prince, viscount (Tso); cyclical character (Shu); loan for l. (Shï); for n. cherish (Shu); [discussion of variant forms b–j]

k. 仔 *tsi̯əg / tsi, tsi: / tsï burden (Shï).
l. 孜 *tsi̯əg / tsi / tsï diligent (Shu).
m. 耔 *tsi̯əg / tsi: / tsï to hoe earth round plants (Shï).

n. 字 *dz'i̯əg / dz'i- / tsï to breed (Yi); nurture (Shï); to love, fondle (Shï); to foster (Tso); adolescent's name, designation (Tso); compound character in the script, written character (Han time text ex.).

(In the original, the characters are handwritten at the top of each page, separately from the text.) Tones, omitted in the earlier Grammata Serica, are indicated in the Middle Chinese form by appending ":" (rising tone) or "-" (departing tone), with the level and entering tones unmarked. The names of texts containing the various uses are abbreviated, here Shï for Shijing, Lunyü (The Analects), Tso for Zuo Zhuan, Shu for Shujing and Yi for I Ching.

Entries are grouped according to the rhyme groups extracted by traditional Chinese scholarship from the rhyming practice of the Shijing, in accordance with the observation of Duan Yucai that characters in the same phonetic series fell in the same rhyme group.

Entries	Spelling	Rhyme group	Entries	Spelling	Rhyme group
1–31	-â, -a, -ă	歌 (part)	697–765	-âng, -ang, -ăng	陽
32–107	-å, -o	魚 (part)	766–800	-âk, -ak, -ăk	鐸
108–138	-u	侯 (part)	801–807	-âg, -ag, -ăg	魚 (part)
139–267	-ân, -an, -ăn	元	808–843	-ĕng, -eng	耕
268–312	-ât, -at, -ăt	月	844–860	-ĕk, -ek	錫
313–348	-âd, -ad, -ăd	祭	861–880	-ĕg, -eg	支/佳
349–360	-âr, -ar, -ăr	歌 (part)	881–902	-əng, -ɛng, -ŭng	蒸
361–392	-en, -ĕn	真	903–935	-ək, -ɛk, -ŭk	職
393–411	-et, -ĕt	質	936–1001	-əg, -ɛg, -ŭg	之
412–415	-ed, -ĕd	脂	1002–1015	-ông, -ộng	冬/中
416–485	-ən, -ɛn	文/諄	1016–1038	-ôk, -ộk	覺/沃
486–507	-ət, -ɛt	物/術	1039–1116	-ôg, -ộg	幽
508–540	-əd, -ɛd	微	1117–1128	-ok, -ǒk, -åk	藥
541–605	-ər, -ɛr	微	1129–1171	-og, -ǒg	宵
606–627	-âm, -am, -ăm	談	1172–1201	-ung, -ŭng	東
628–642	-âp, -ap, -ăp	葉/盍	1202–1228	-uk, -ŭk	屋
643–674	-əm, -ɛm	侵	1229–1235	-ug, -ŭg	侯 (part)
675–696	-əp, -ɛp	緝	1236–1260	unable to reconstruct	

The radical index covers only the head character in each entry.

== See also ==
- Shuowen tongxun dingsheng – a Qing study of the Shuowen Jiezi with a similar structure
