= Albert-Auguste Fauvel =

French naturalist

Albert-Auguste Fauvel (7 November 1851, in Cherbourg-en-Cotentin – 3 November 1909, in Cherbourg) was a French naturalist, known for providing the first detailed description of the Chinese alligator.

In 1872 he joined the Chinese Maritime Customs Service in Beijing. Later on, he was based in Yantai, from where he spent several years investigating the natural history of Shandong province. In 1877 he relocated to Shanghai, and in 1882–84 was stationed in Hankou. Afterwards, he served as inspecteur des services of the Messageries Maritimes in Paris.

== Selected works ==
- "The province of Shantung: its geography, natural history &c." (published in English, 1875).
- "Trip of a naturalist to the Chinese Far East" (published in English, 1876).
- "The wild silk-worms of the province of Shan-tung" (published in English, 1877).
- "Alligators in China: their history, description and identification" (published in English, 1879).
- "Unpublished documents on the history of the Seychelles Islands anterior to 1810" (published in English, 1909).
