= Shuowen Tongxun Dingsheng =

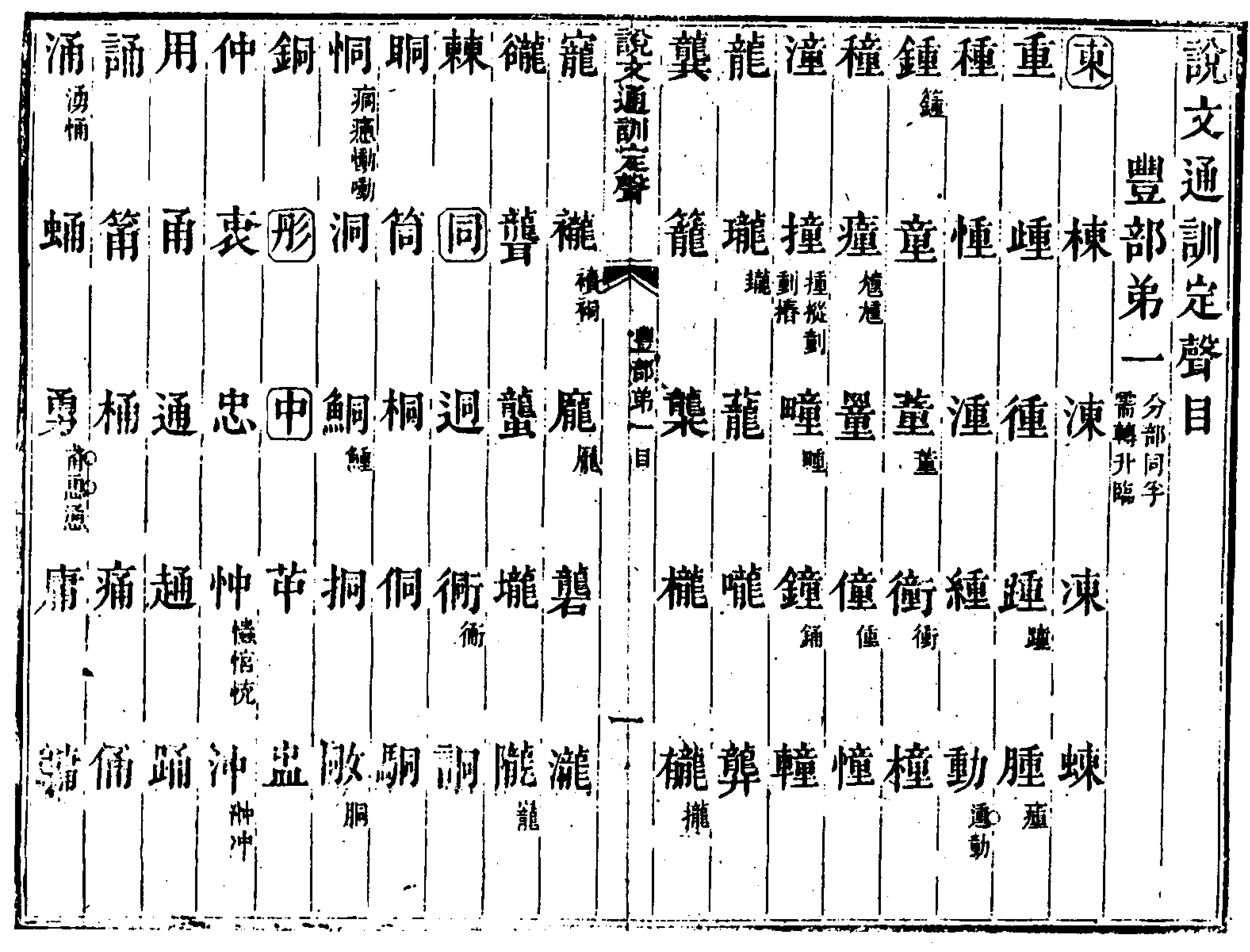
Start of the first section of the Shuowen Tongxun Dingsheng, covering the 豐 fēng rhyme group, beginning with phonetic components 東 dōng, 同 tōng, 彤 tōng and 中 zhōng

The Shuowen Tongxun Dingsheng (Chinese: 說文通訓定聲; pinyin: Shuōwén tōngxùn dìngshēng) is an 18-volume study of the Shuowen Jiezi completed in 1833 by the Qing phonologist Zhu Junsheng (朱駿聲) (1788–1858) and published in 1870. The bulk of the work is a phonetic study in which the 9000 characters of the Shuowen Jiezi and 7000 additional characters are grouped into 1137 series, each sharing a phonetic element. These phonetic series were further grouped into 18 Shijing rhyme groups, based on Duan Yucai's dictum that characters sharing a phonetic element belonged in the same rhyme group. The work thus anticipated the structure of Bernard Karlgren's Grammata Serica Recensa. The work also includes very detailed notes on rhyming, semantics, and interchangeable characters.
