= John Thorbjarnarson =

American zoologist (1957–2010)

John Björn Thorbjarnarson (March 23, 1957 – February 14, 2010) was an Icelandic crocodilia conservationist known for helping rescue numerous species from the brink of extinction. Thorbjarnarson attended Cornell University, and in 1991 he received his Ph.D. from the University of Florida. Thorbjarnarson was a conservation officer for the Wildlife Conservation Society in Gainesville, Florida for 19 years. He sought to preserve crocodile populations in Cuba (where he spent more than a decade doing research) and Brazil, and to educate people about crocodiles and to ameliorate some of their fear. Thorbjarnarson traveled around the world and visiting swamps to help endangered reptiles after discovering that 23 species were in decline in 1988. He traveled to Asia, Africa, and Latin America to protect endangered species, visiting more than 30 countries in total. Thorbjarnarson wrote a book called The Chinese Alligator: Ecology, Behavior, Conservation, and Culture, which talks about how the Chinese alligator is very important to the Chinese culture and history, including information about its relation to the Chinese dragon legend, as well as the biology and behavior of the species. Thorbjarnarson died of falciparum malaria on February 14, 2010. Thorbjarnarson's family set up a foundation for The Wildlife Conservation Society.
