= Yuanfeng =

Yuanfeng was a Chinese era name used by several emperors of China. It may refer to:

- Yuanfeng (元封, 110BC–105BC), an era name used by Emperor Wu of Han
- Yuanfeng (元鳳, 80BC–75BC), an era name used by Emperor Zhao of Han
- Yuanfeng (元豐, 1078–1085), an era name used by Emperor Shenzong of Song
