= Parken Zoo =

Zoo in Sweden

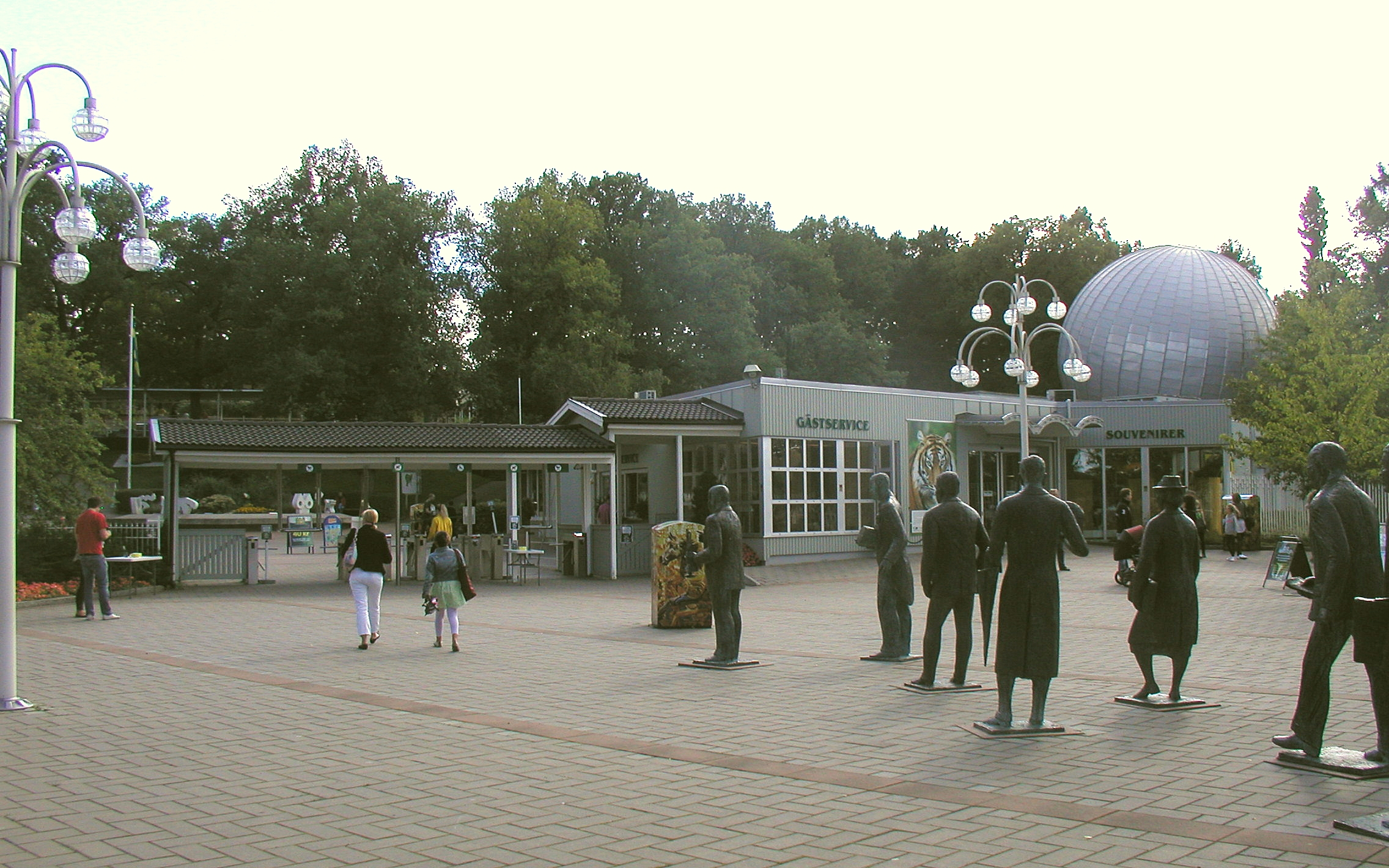
- Main entrance with sculptures of famous actors.
- Interactive map of Parken Zoo
- 59.3733°N 16.4822°E
- Date opened: July 1898; 127 years ago
- Location: Eskilstuna; Sweden
- Land area: Near Tuna Park shopping mall
- No. of animals: 200
- Memberships: Mats Ericson (CEO)
- Owner: Eskilstuna Municipality
- Website: http://www.parkenzoo.se

Parken Zoo is a combined amusement park and zoo in the town of Eskilstuna in Sweden.

The amusement park was founded in 1898, and there was a display of animals from the beginning of the fifties. In 1954 Parken Zoo started to charge visitors an entrance fee. In 1956 the zoo displayed around 200 animals.

During the eighties the zoo started to specialize in feline carnivores.

In 2013 a clouded leopard escaped from its enclosure and killed three deer.

== The history of Parken zoo ==
Parken zoo opened on the 3rd July 1898. And during the 1950s the zoo became a part of Parken Zoo. The prize of an entry ticket was 50 öre which is half of a Swedish krona. The zoo grew a little each day and by the year 1956, the zoo had 200 animals of different species.

It was announced on the 24th May 2016 that the zoo was sold to the company Mimir Capital AB for the sum of one Swedish krona by Eskilstuna Municipality who retained ownership of the land.
